= Flying lizard (disambiguation) =

A flying lizard is a gliding lizard of genus Draco.

Flying lizard(s) may also refer to:

== Animals ==
- Draco blanfordii
- Draco maculatus
- Draco norvillii
- Draco volans
- Draco sumatranus
- Draco taeniopterus
- Several other Draco species
- Prehistoric Xianglong

== Other uses ==
- Flying Lizard Motorsports, a motorsport team from Sonoma, California
- The Flying Lizards, an English rock band
  - The Flying Lizards (album), a 1979 album by the band

== See also ==
- Pterosaur, a Latin term translated as "winged lizard"
