= Dusky gliding lizard =

There are two species of lizard named dusky gliding lizard:

- Draco obscurus, found in Indonesia and Thailand
- Draco formosus, found in Thailand and Malaysia
