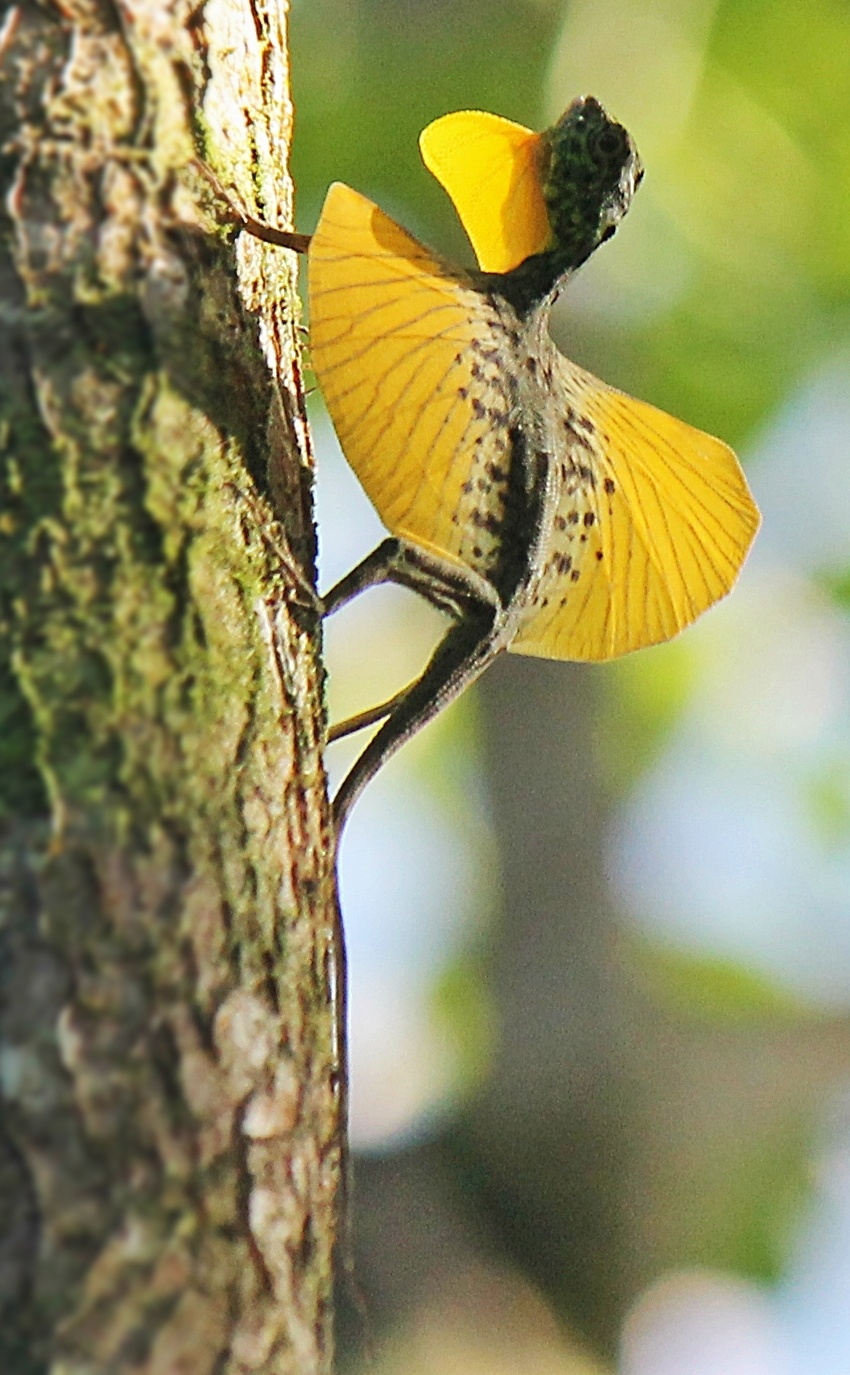

Scientific classification
- Kingdom: Animalia
- Phylum: Chordata
- Class: Reptilia
- Order: Squamata
- Suborder: Iguania
- Family: Agamidae
- Genus: Draco
- Species: D. spilonotus

Binomial name
- Draco spilonotus Günther, 1872
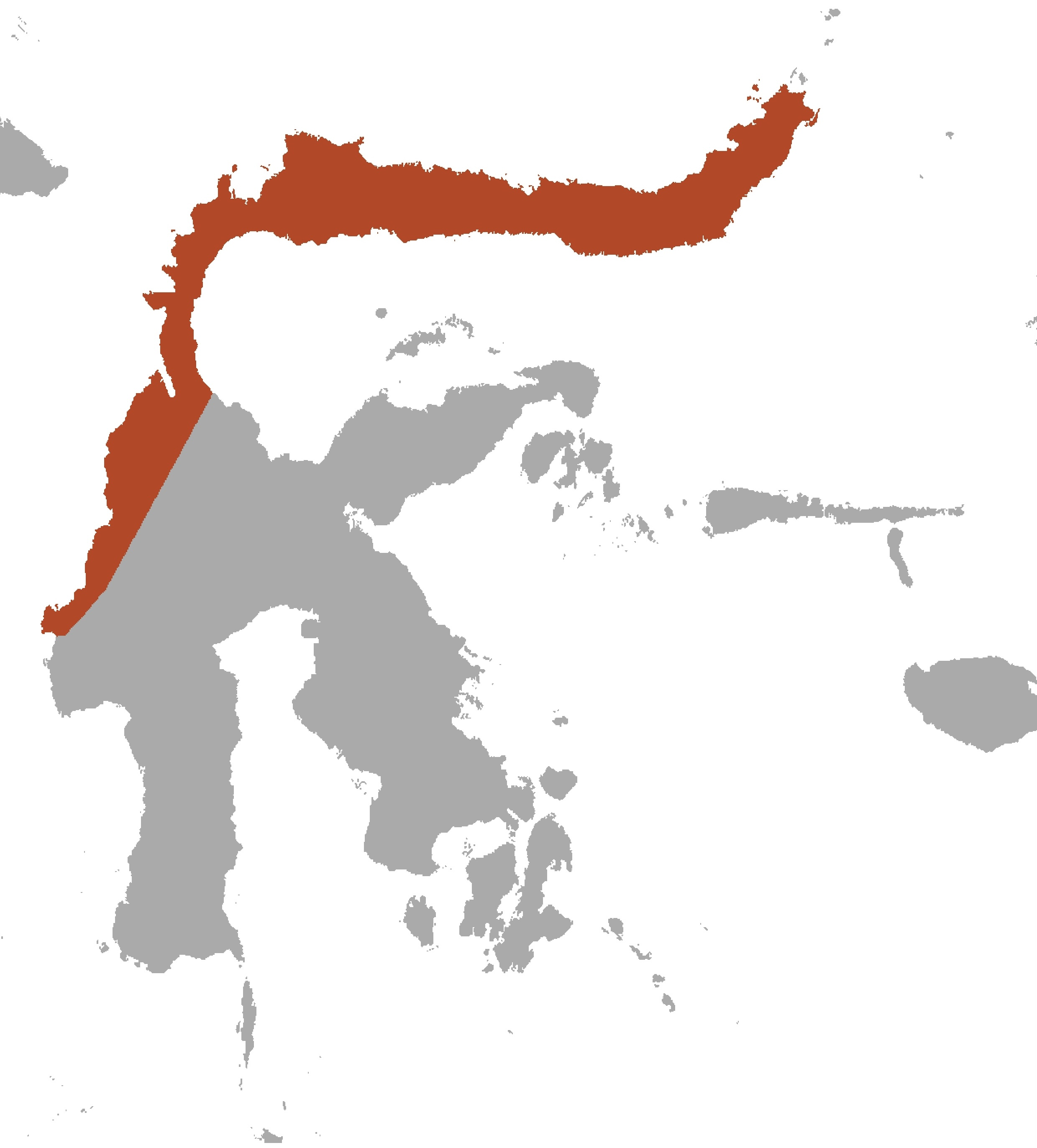

Synonyms
- Draco lineatus spilonotus

= Draco spilonotus =

Species of lizard

Draco spilonotus, the Sulawesi lined gliding lizard, is a lizard endemic to Sulawesi. The species is known from various localities in forested areas of Sulawesi.

The patagium of the male is yellow in colour and has a network of brown lines radiating from the anterior. The gular flag is yellow and rounded in shape.

== General References ==
1. Boulenger, George Albert (1885). Catalogue of the lizards in the British museum (Natural history), Volume I (2nd ed.). London: Department of Zoology, British Museum (Natural History). p. 265.
2. de Rooij, Nelly (1915). The reptiles of the Indo-Australian archipelago. Leiden: E. J. Brill. pp. 77–78.
3. McGuire, Jimmy A.; Heang, Kiew Bong (February 2001). "Phylogenetic systematics of Southeast Asian flying lizards (Iguania: Agamidae: Draco) as inferred from mitochondrial DNA sequence data" (PDF). Biological Journal of the Linnean Society. 72 (2): 203–229. Bibcode:2001BJLS...72..203M. doi:10.1006/bijl.2000.0487.

== Helpful Websites, and External Resources ==
- Draco Volans
- Nation Geographic Flying Dragon
- Zoological Science Flying Lizards Genus Draco
- Herpetological Monographs, 2007
