= Draco walkeri =

Scientific classification
- Kingdom: Animalia
- Phylum: Chordata
- Class: Reptilia
- Order: Squamata
- Suborder: Iguania
- Family: Agamidae
- Genus: Draco
- Species: D. walkeri

Binomial name
- Draco walkeri Boulenger, 1891
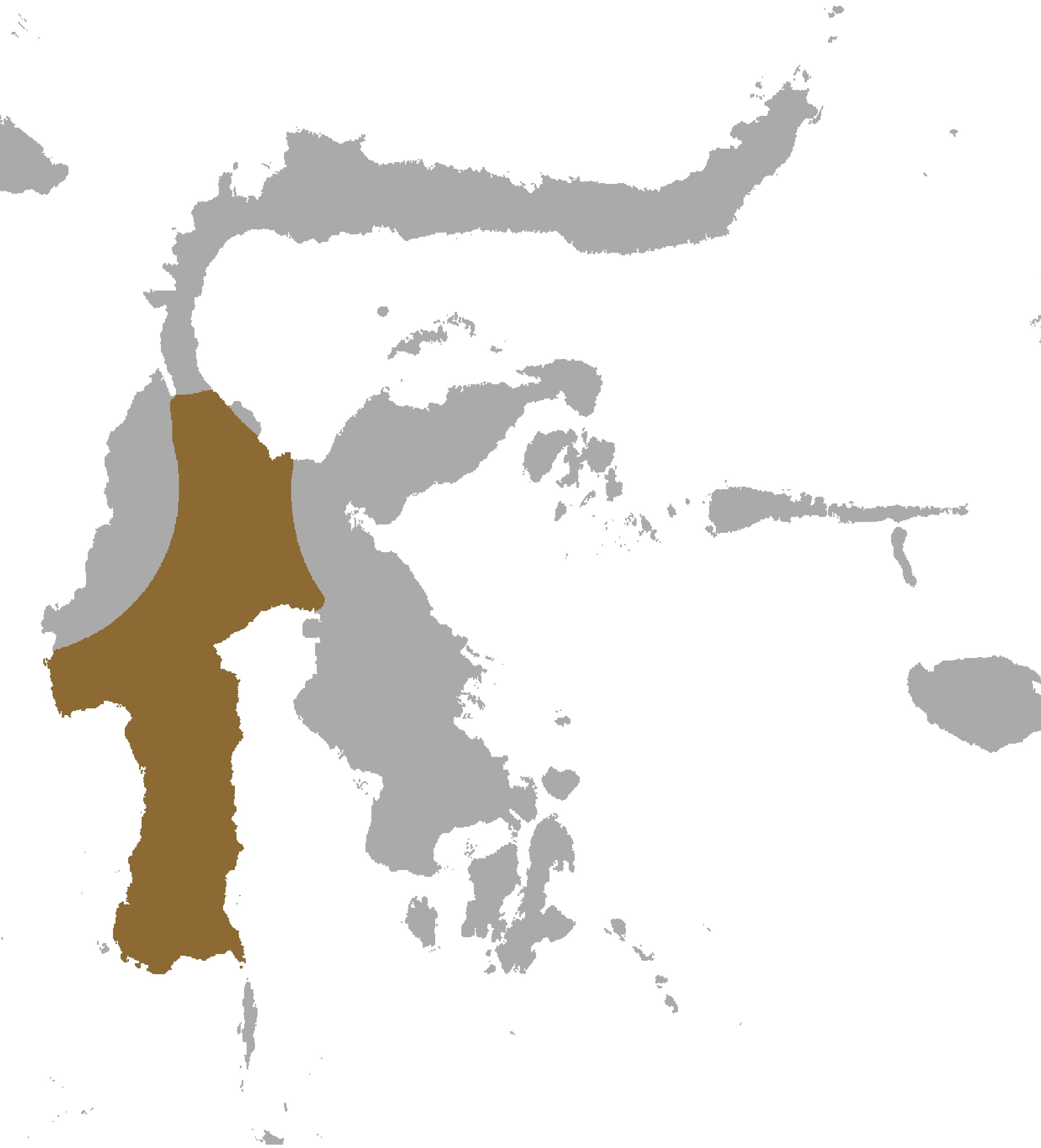

Species of lizard

Draco walkeri is a species of agamid lizard. It is found in Indonesia.
