= Draco rhytisma =

Scientific classification
- Kingdom: Animalia
- Phylum: Chordata
- Class: Reptilia
- Order: Squamata
- Suborder: Iguania
- Family: Agamidae
- Genus: Draco
- Species: D. rhytisma

Binomial name
- Draco rhytisma Musters, 1983
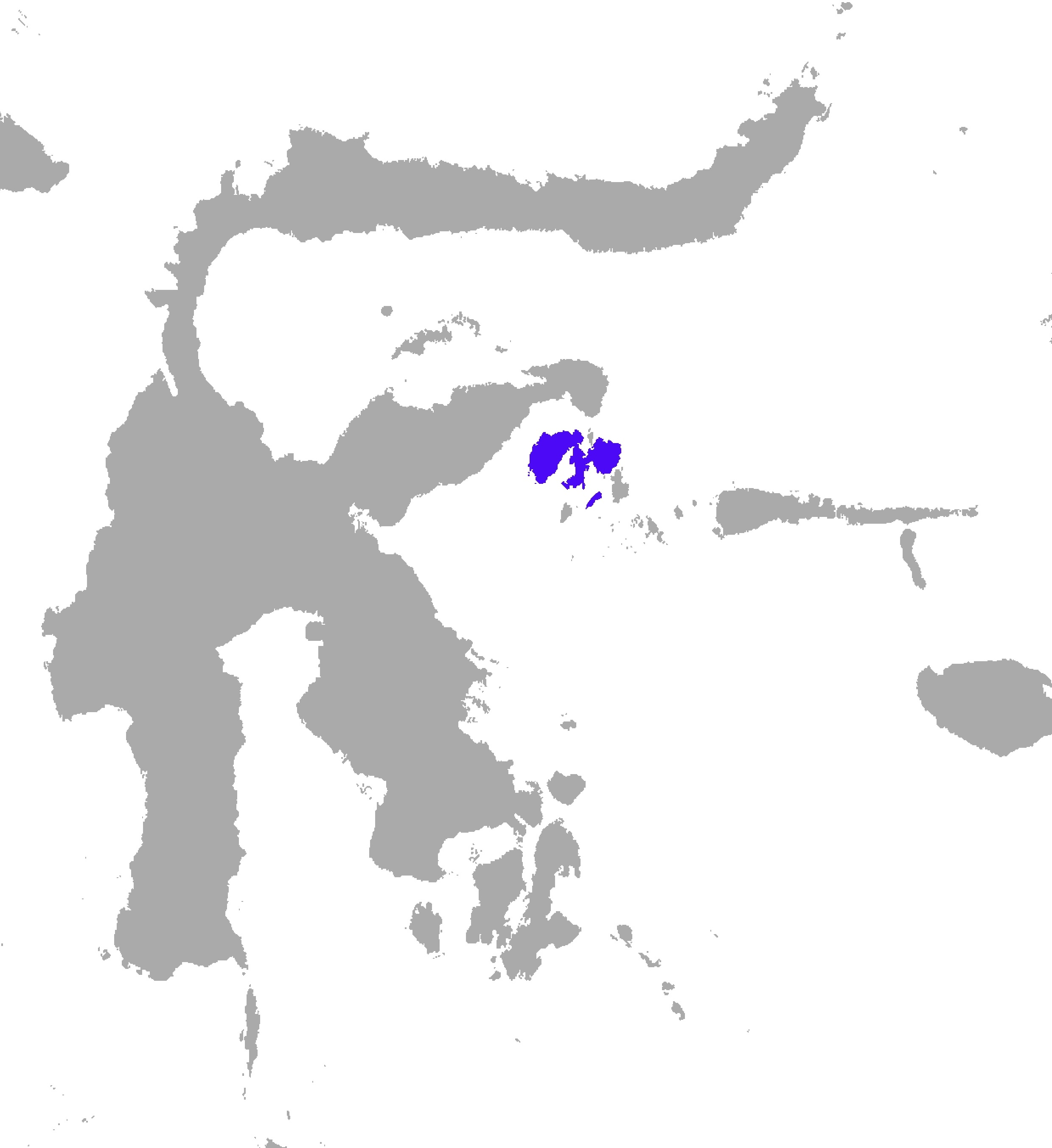

Species of lizard

Draco rhytisma is a species of agamid lizard. It is found in Indonesia.
