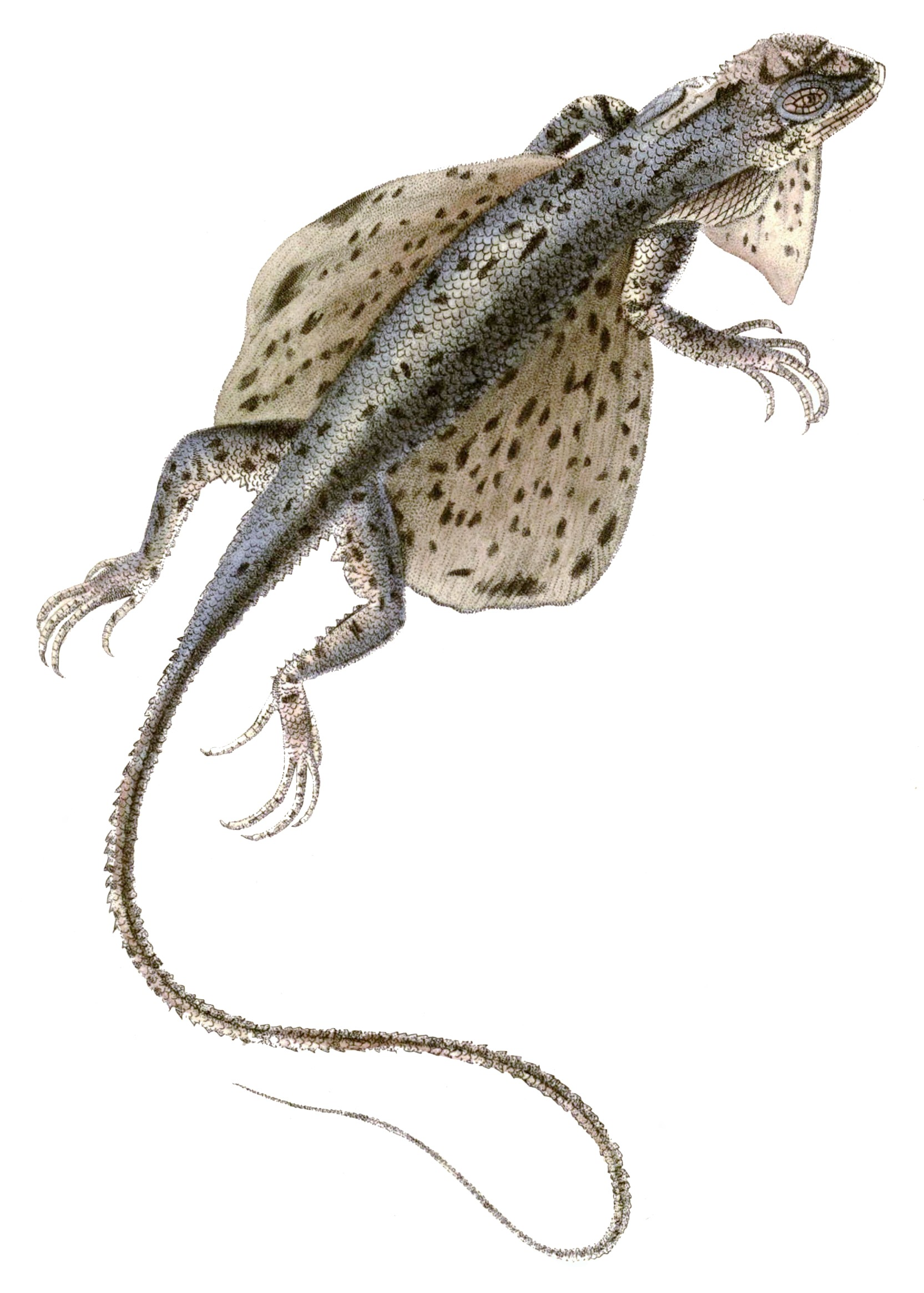

Conservation status
- Least Concern (IUCN 3.1)

Scientific classification
- Kingdom: Animalia
- Phylum: Chordata
- Class: Reptilia
- Order: Squamata
- Suborder: Iguania
- Family: Agamidae
- Genus: Draco
- Species: D. spilopterus

Binomial name
- Draco spilopterus Wiegmann, 1834)

= Draco spilopterus =

Species of lizard

Draco spilopterus, the Philippine flying dragon, is a species of agamid lizard. It is found only in the Philippines.
