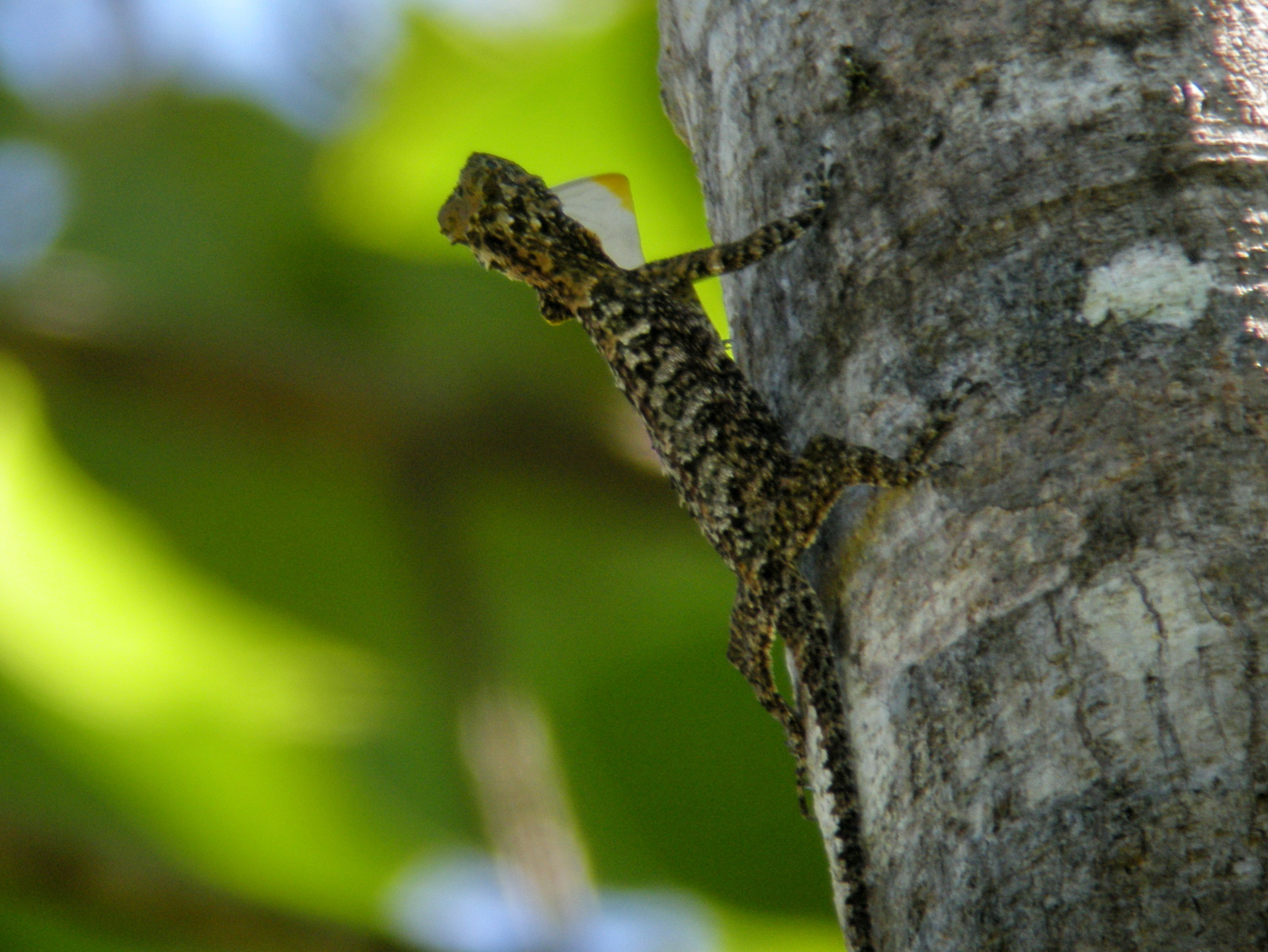

Conservation status
- Least Concern (IUCN 3.1)

Scientific classification
- Kingdom: Animalia
- Phylum: Chordata
- Class: Reptilia
- Order: Squamata
- Suborder: Iguania
- Family: Agamidae
- Genus: Draco
- Species: D. fimbriatus

Binomial name
- Draco fimbriatus Kuhl, 1820

= Draco fimbriatus =

Species of lizard

Draco fimbriatus, the fringed flying dragon or crested gliding lizard, is a species of agamid lizard. It is found in Malaysia, Indonesia, the Philippines, and Thailand.
