= Draco palawanensis =

Conservation status
- Least Concern (IUCN 3.1)

Scientific classification
- Kingdom: Animalia
- Phylum: Chordata
- Class: Reptilia
- Order: Squamata
- Suborder: Iguania
- Family: Agamidae
- Genus: Draco
- Species: D. palawanensis

Binomial name
- Draco palawanensis McGuire & Alcala, 2000

Species of lizard

Draco palawanensis is a species of agamid lizard. It is found in the Philippines.
