= Draco cyanopterus =

Conservation status
- Least Concern (IUCN 3.1)

Scientific classification
- Domain: Eukaryota
- Kingdom: Animalia
- Phylum: Chordata
- Class: Reptilia
- Order: Squamata
- Suborder: Iguania
- Family: Agamidae
- Genus: Draco
- Species: D. cyanopterus

Binomial name
- Draco cyanopterus Peters, 1867
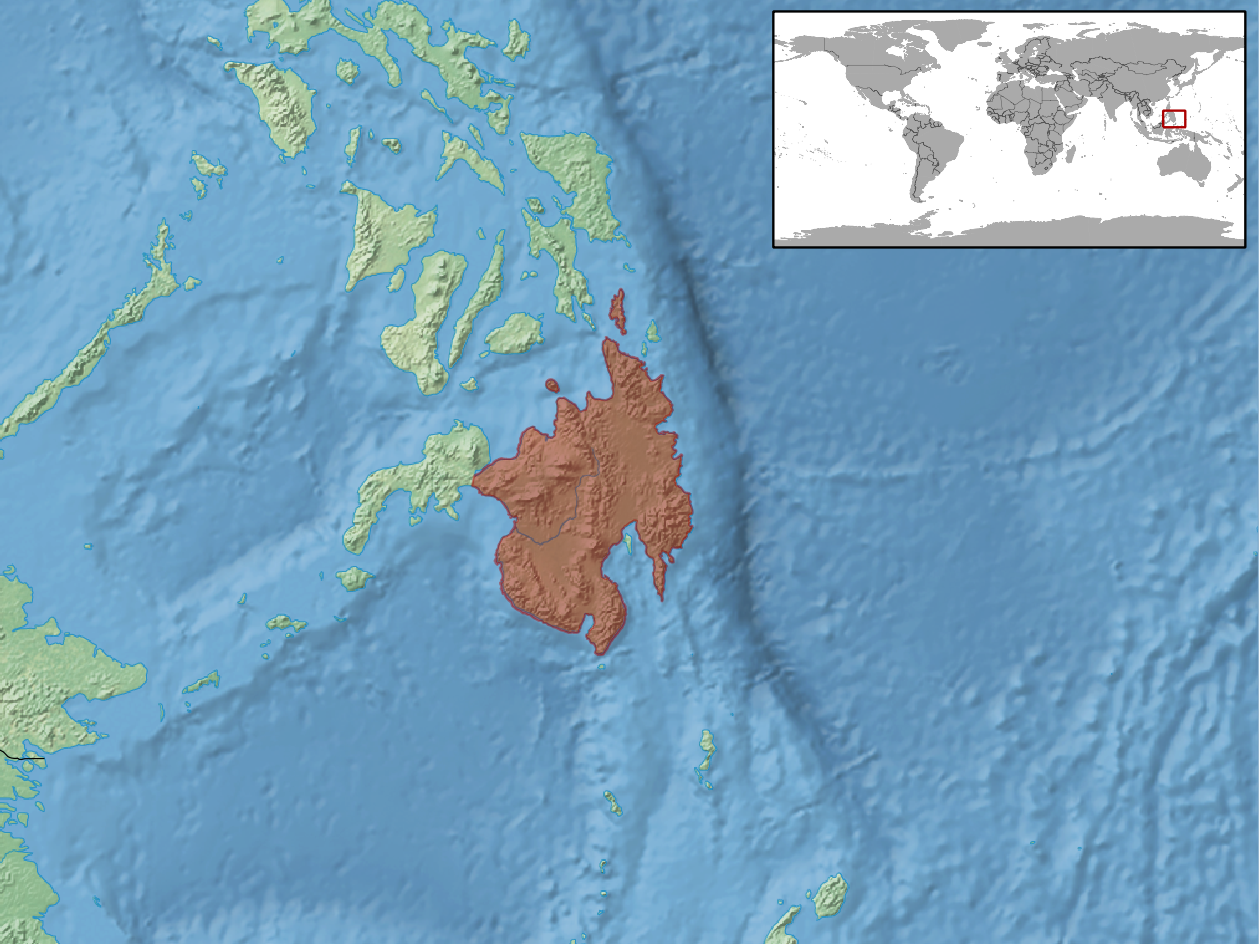

Species of lizard

Draco cyanopterus is a species of agamid lizard. It is found in the Philippines.
