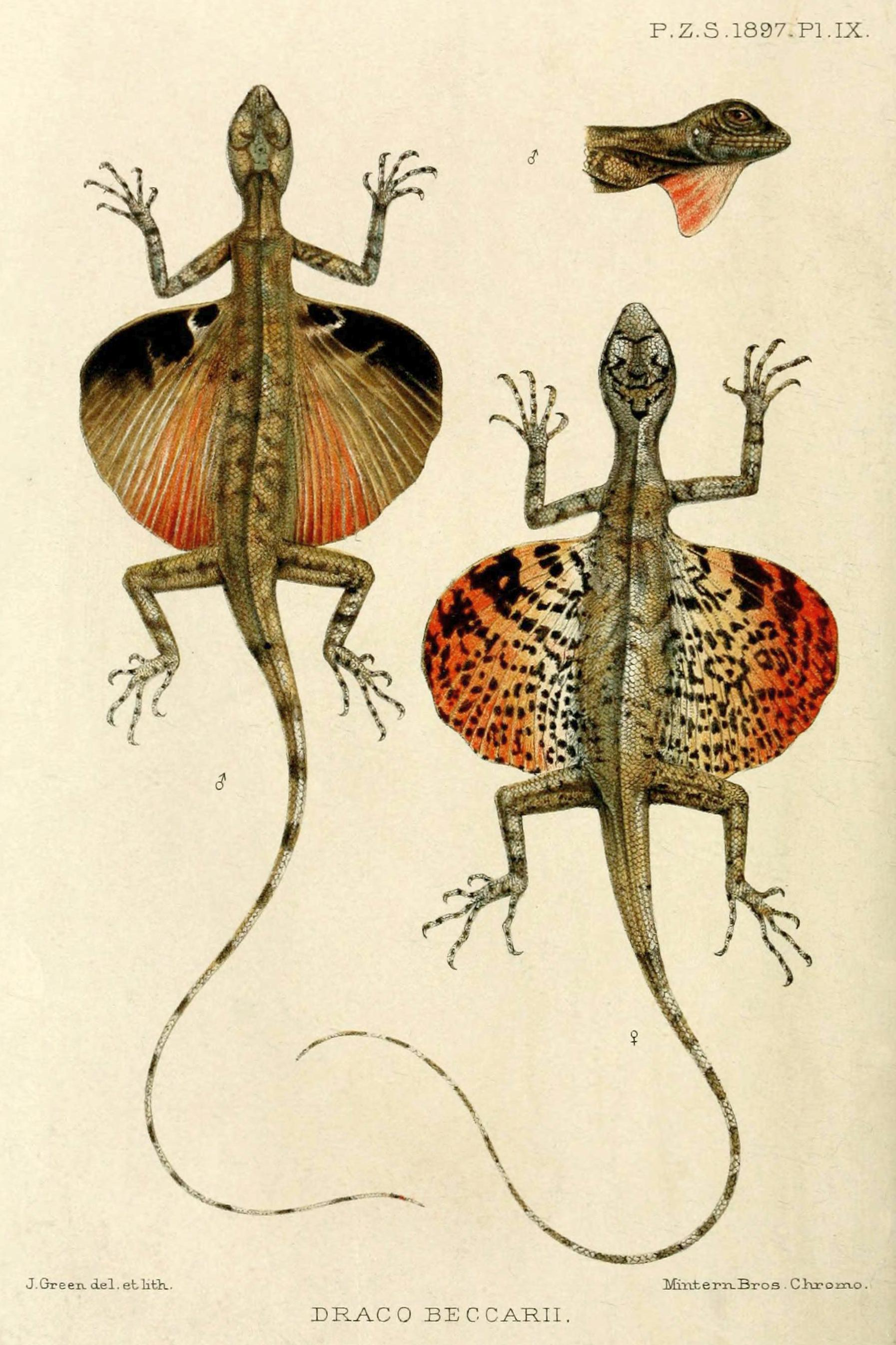

Conservation status
- Least Concern (IUCN 3.1)

Scientific classification
- Kingdom: Animalia
- Phylum: Chordata
- Class: Reptilia
- Order: Squamata
- Suborder: Iguania
- Family: Agamidae
- Genus: Draco
- Species: D. beccarii

Binomial name
- Draco beccarii W. Peters & Doria, 1878
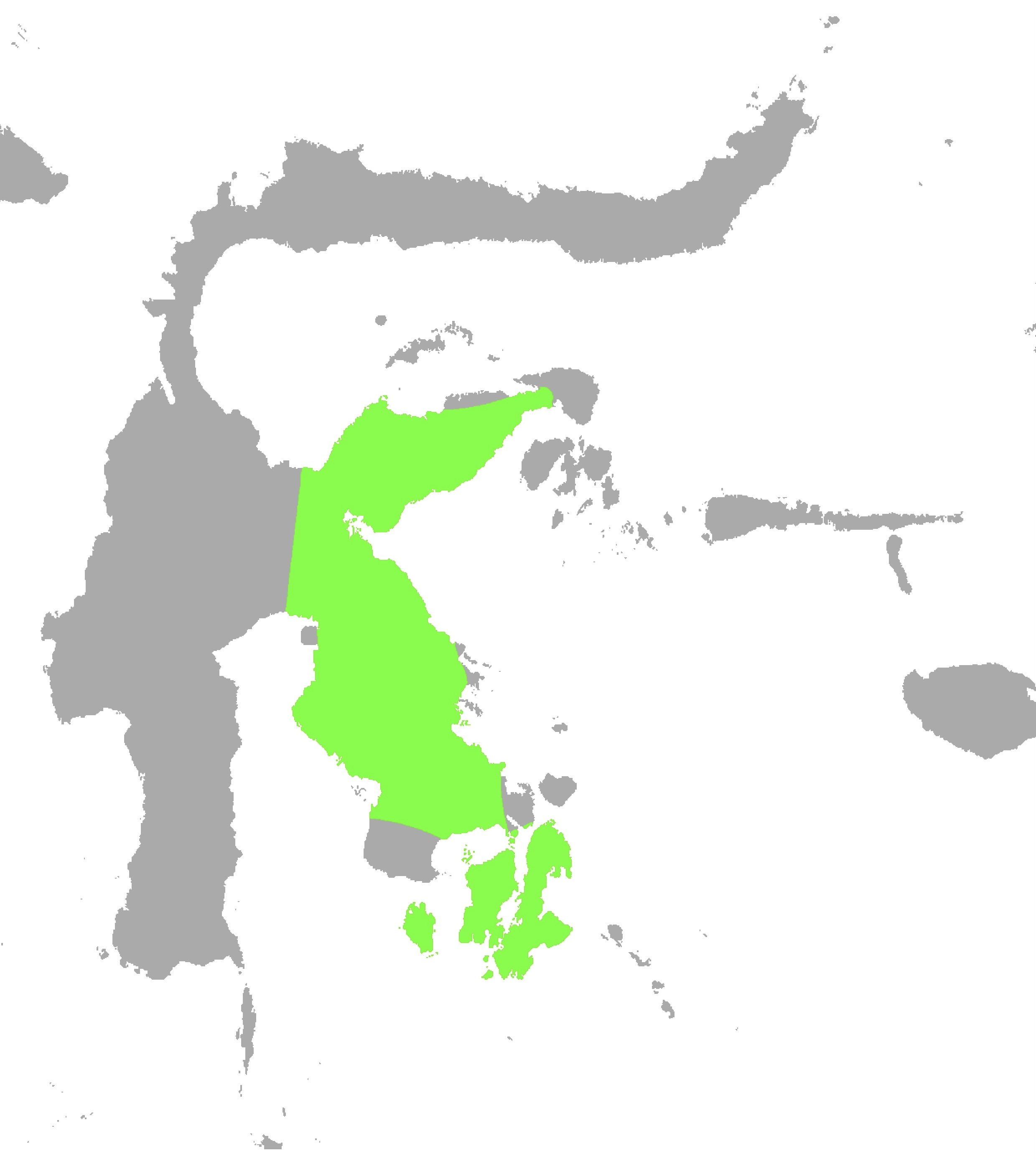

Synonyms
- Draco beccarii W. Peters & Doria, 1878; Draco lineatus beccarii — Hennig, 1936; Draco beccarii — McGuire & Kiew, 2001

= Draco beccarii =

Species of lizard

Draco beccarii is a species of lizard in the family Agamidae. The species is endemic to Indonesia.

== Etymology ==
The specific name, beccarii, is in honor of Italian botanist Odoardo Beccari.

== Geographic range ==
In Indonesia, D. beccarii is found on the following islands: Buton, Kabaena, Muna, and eastern Sulawesi.

== Description ==
D. beccarii may attain a snout-to-vent length (SVL) of 7.5 cm (3.0 in), and a tail length of 14 cm (5.5 in).

== Reproduction ==
D. beccarii is oviparous.
