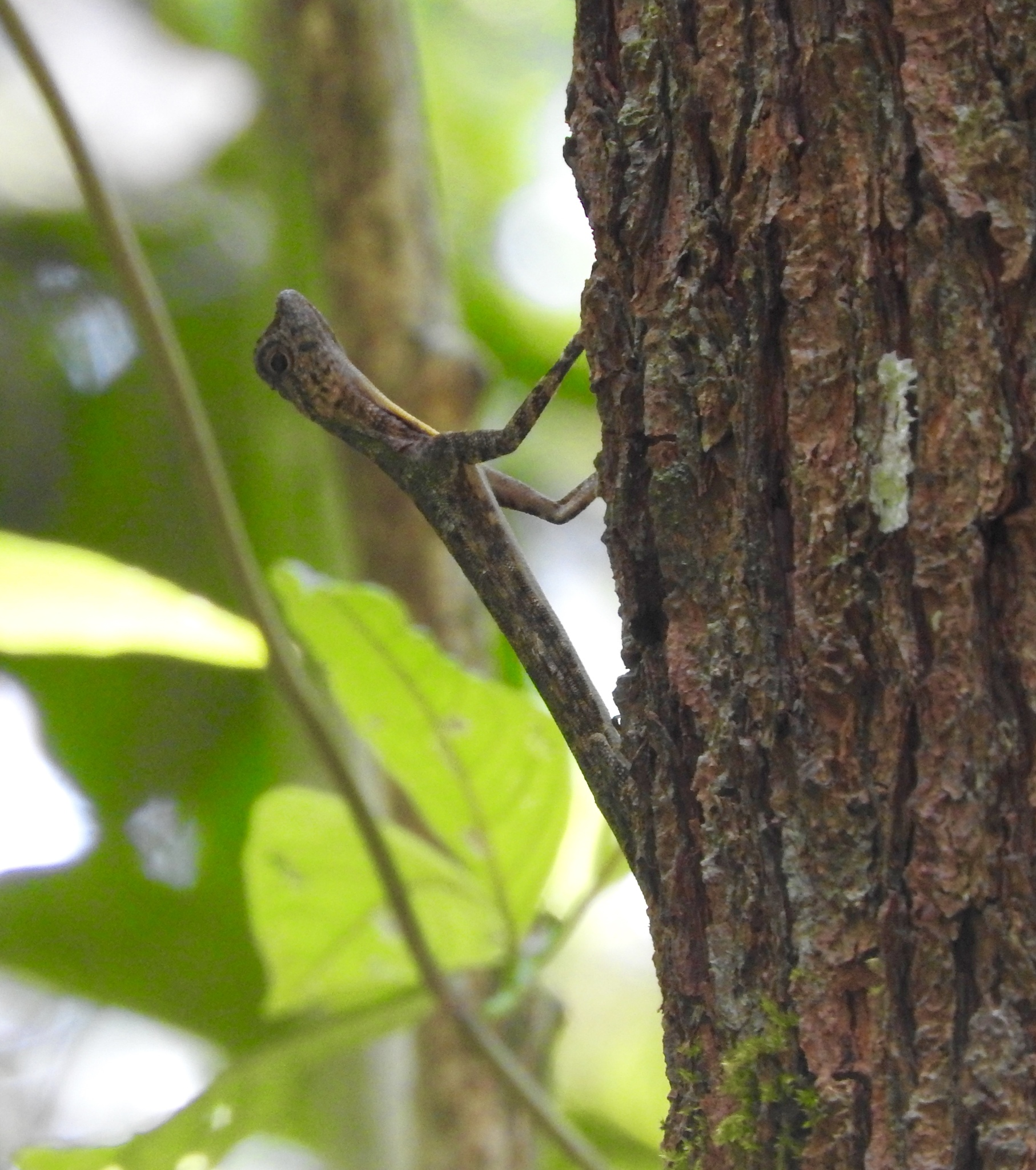

Conservation status
- Least Concern (IUCN 3.1)

Scientific classification
- Kingdom: Animalia
- Phylum: Chordata
- Class: Reptilia
- Order: Squamata
- Suborder: Iguania
- Family: Agamidae
- Genus: Draco
- Species: D. haematopogon

Binomial name
- Draco haematopogon JE Gray, 1831
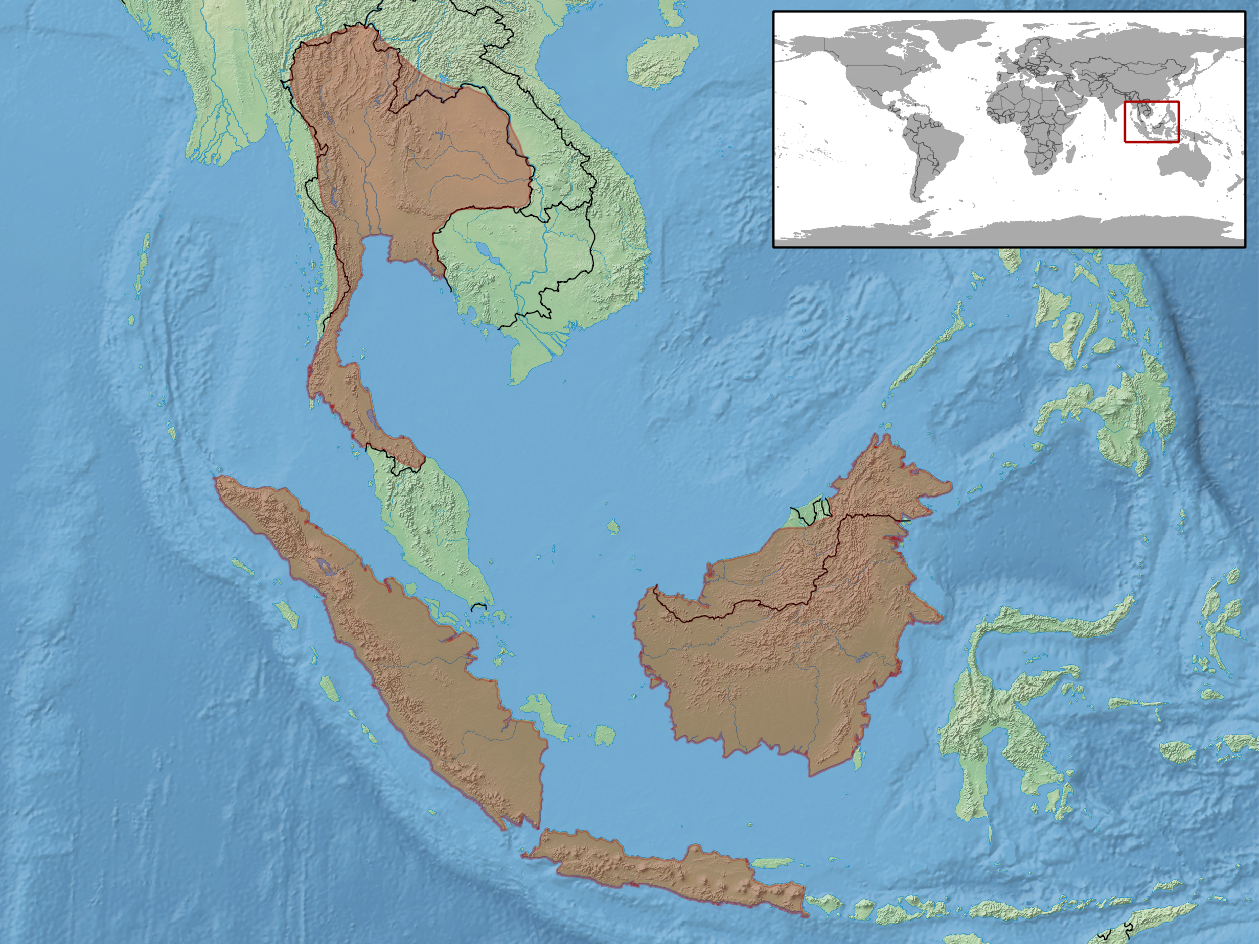

= Draco haematopogon =

Species of lizard

Draco haematopogon, the red-bearded flying dragon or yellow-bearded gliding lizard, is a species of agamid lizard. It is found in Indonesia and Malaysia.
