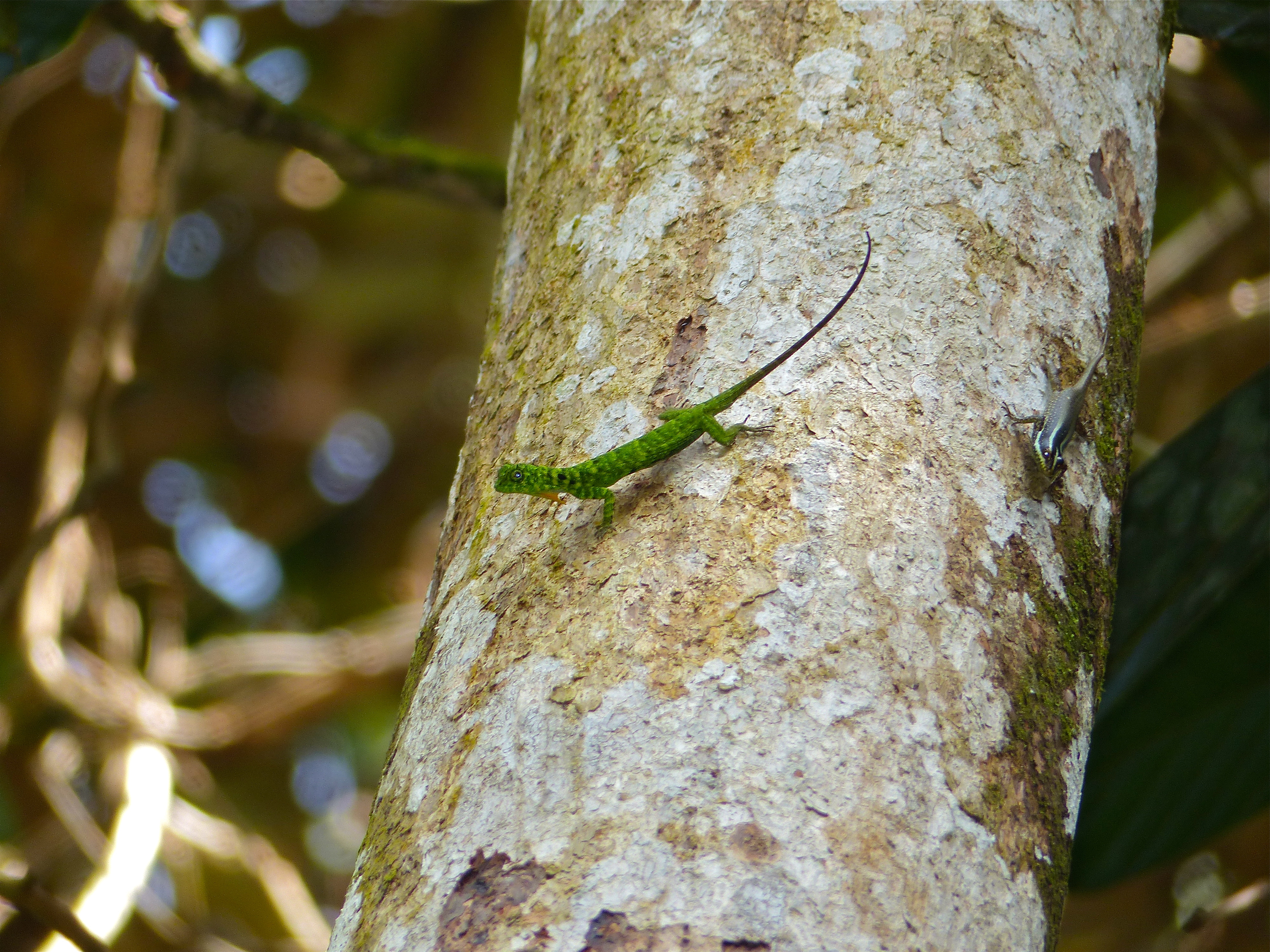

Conservation status
- Least Concern (IUCN 3.1)

Scientific classification
- Kingdom: Animalia
- Phylum: Chordata
- Class: Reptilia
- Order: Squamata
- Suborder: Iguania
- Family: Agamidae
- Genus: Draco
- Species: D. cornutus

Binomial name
- Draco cornutus Günther, 1864
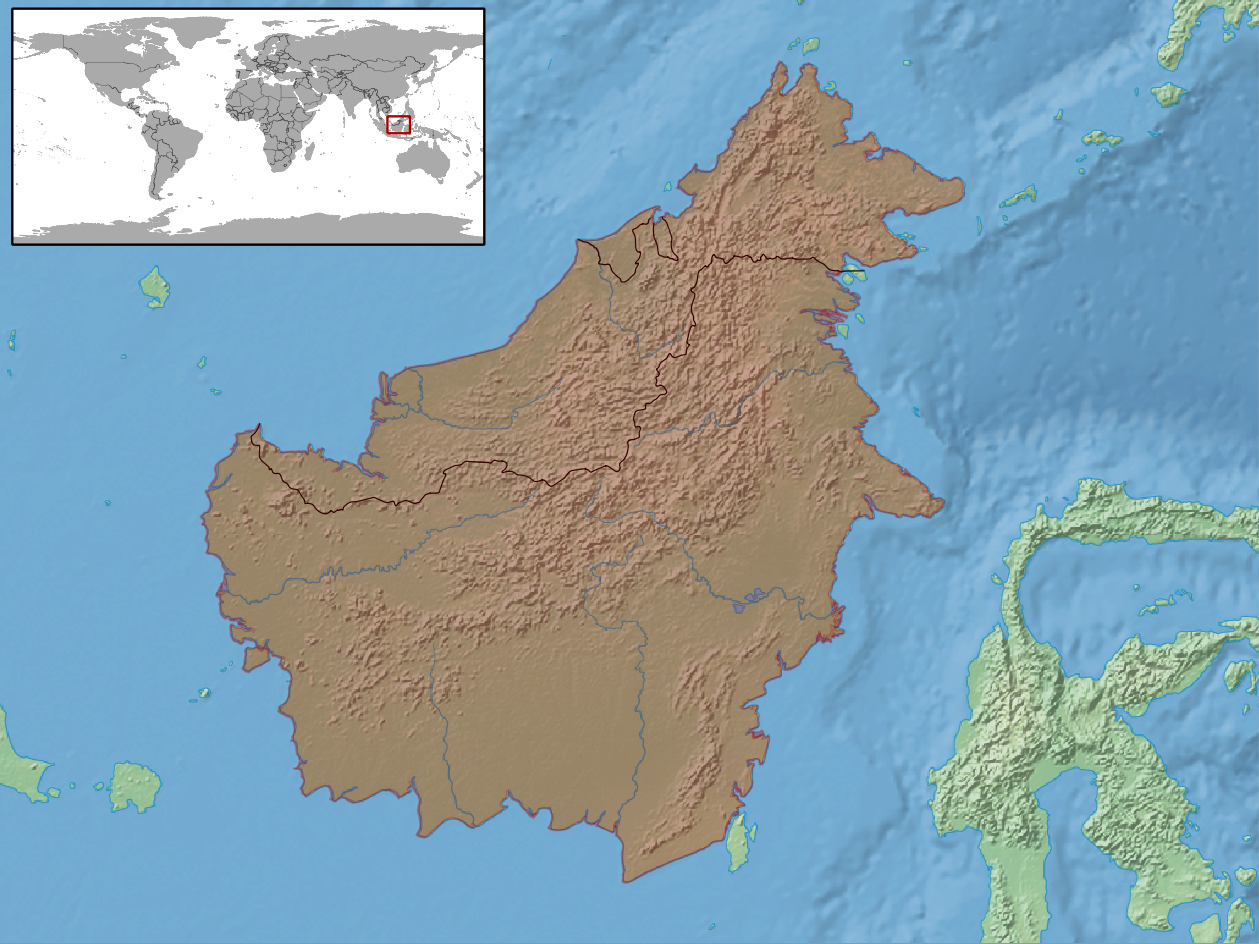
- geographic distribution of Draco cornutus (Native: Brunei Darussalam; Indonesia (Kalimantan); Malaysia (Sabah, Sarawak))

= Draco cornutus =

Species of lizard

Draco cornutus is a species of "flying dragon", an agamid lizard. It is endemic to Borneo. It occurs at elevations up to 700 m (2,300 ft) above sea level, although its distribution is poorly known.

== Description ==
The color of the gliding membrane, or patagia, of Draco cornutus depends on the habitat; populations of these lizards have adapted over time to match the color of local falling leaves. This adaptation provides them with camouflage from potential avian predators.
