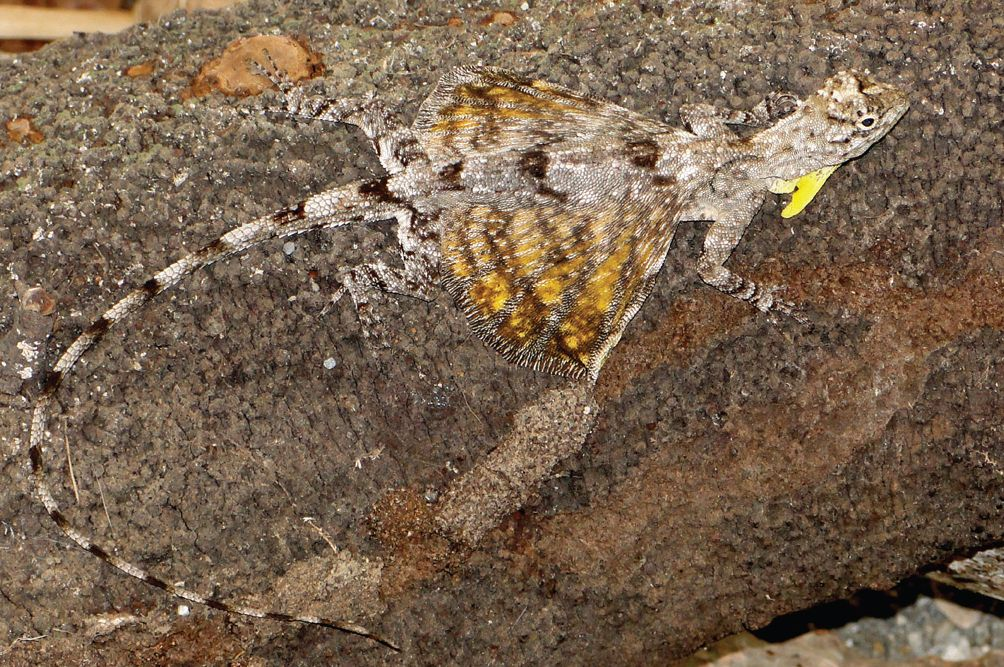

Scientific classification
- Kingdom: Animalia
- Phylum: Chordata
- Class: Reptilia
- Order: Squamata
- Suborder: Iguania
- Family: Agamidae
- Genus: Draco
- Species: D. timoriensis

Binomial name
- Draco timoriensis Kuhl, 1820
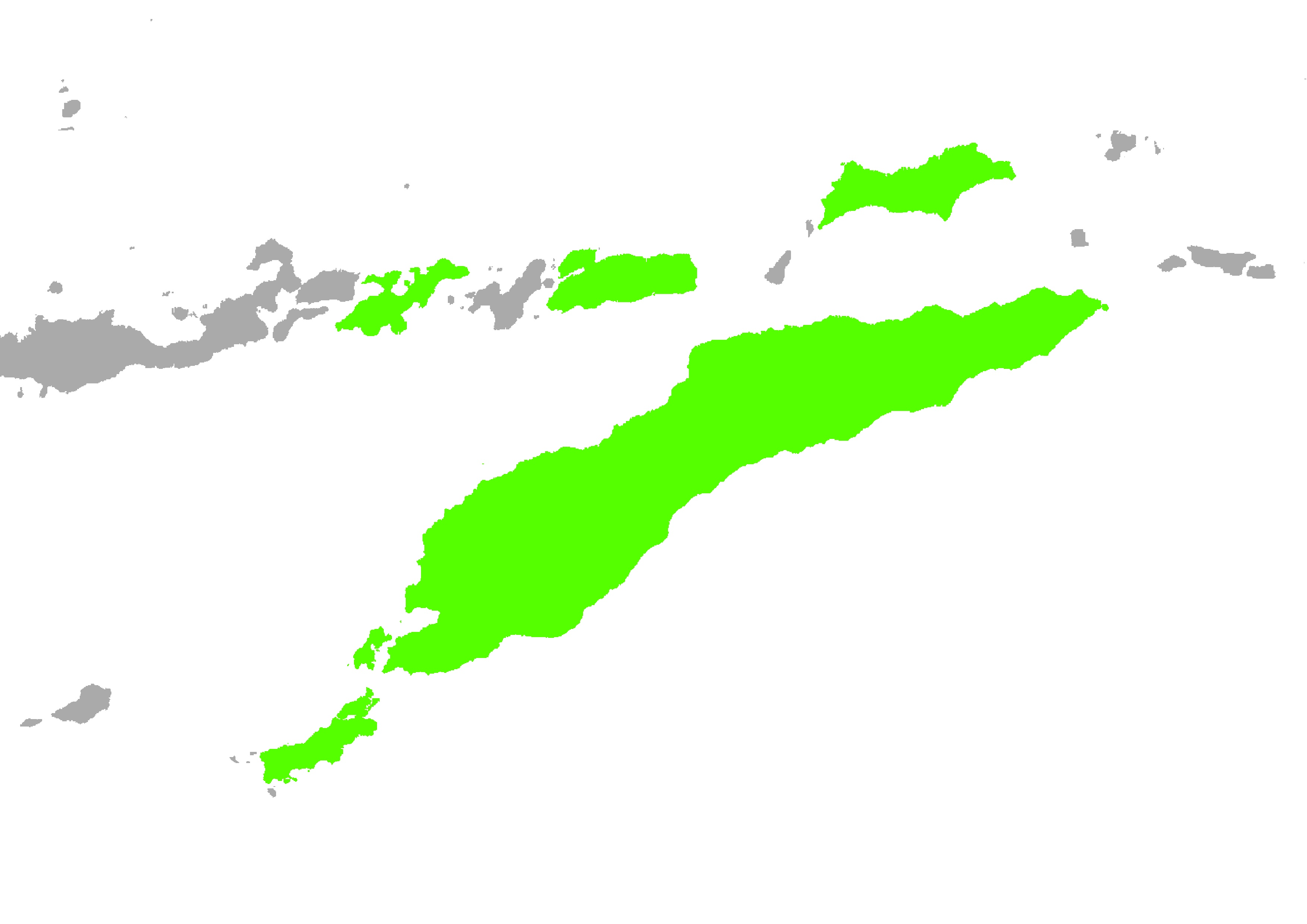

= Draco timoriensis =

Species of lizard

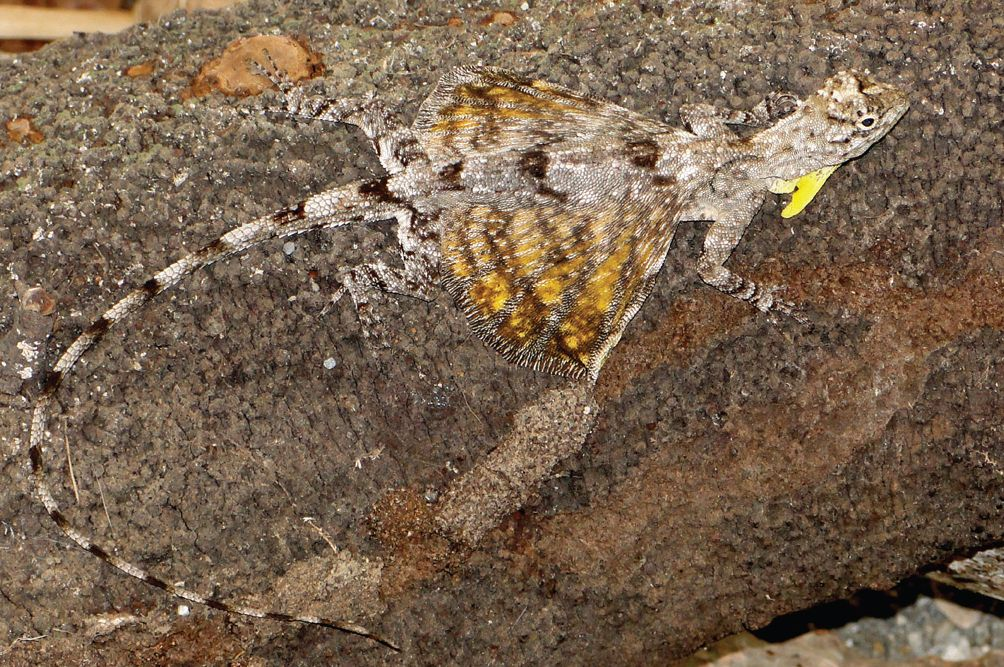
Timor flying dragon (Draco timoriensis)

Draco timoriensis, also known as the Timor flying dragon, is a species of lizard endemic to the Lesser Sunda Islands in Indonesia and Timor-Leste.
