= Draco punctatus =

Conservation status
- Least Concern (IUCN 3.1)

Scientific classification
- Kingdom: Animalia
- Phylum: Chordata
- Class: Reptilia
- Order: Squamata
- Suborder: Iguania
- Family: Agamidae
- Genus: Draco
- Species: D. punctatus

Binomial name
- Draco punctatus Boulenger, 1900

Species of lizard

Draco punctatus, the punctate flying dragon, is a species of agamid lizard. It is found in Indonesia and Malaysia.
