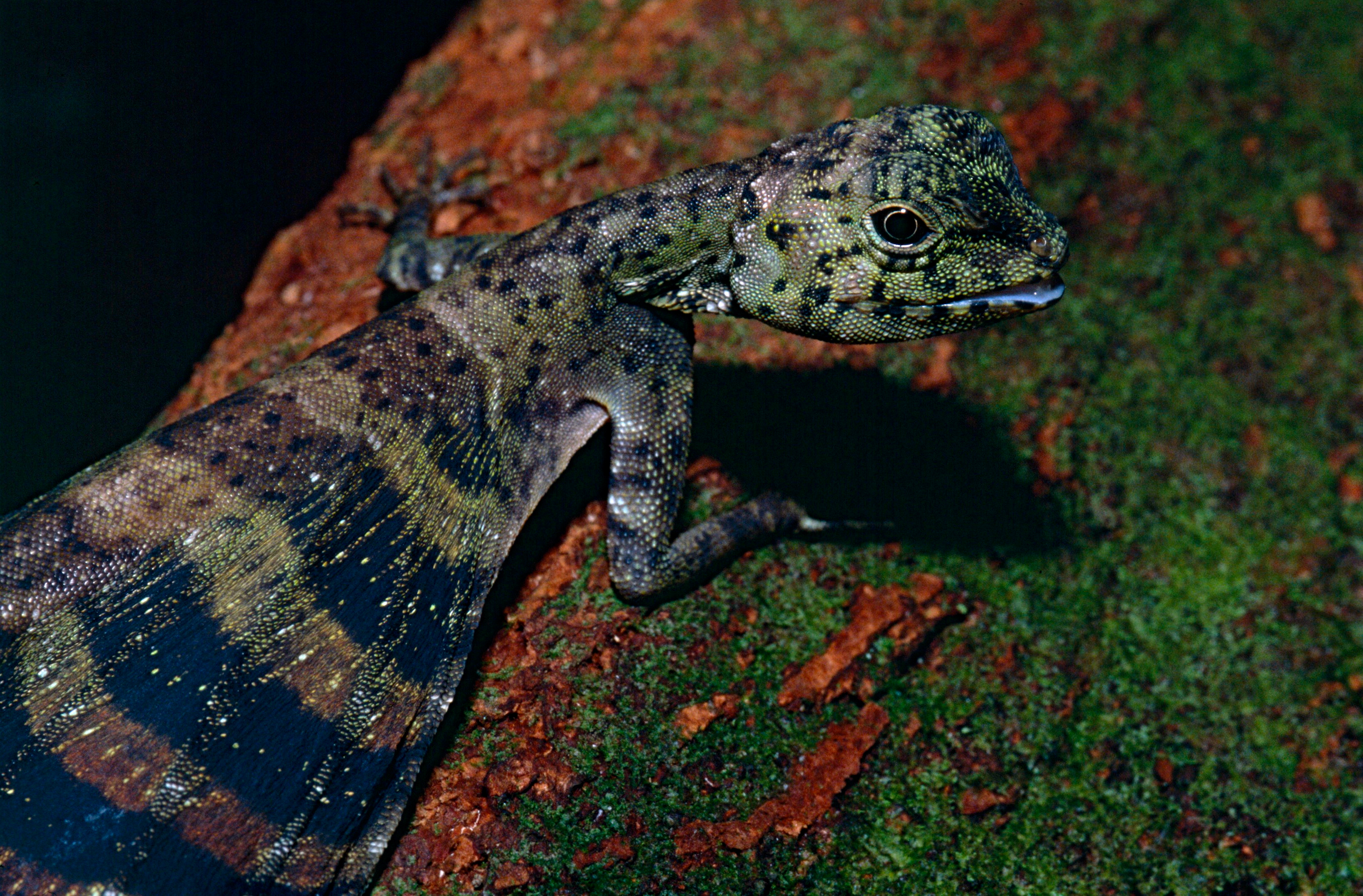

Scientific classification
- Kingdom: Animalia
- Phylum: Chordata
- Class: Reptilia
- Order: Squamata
- Suborder: Iguania
- Family: Agamidae
- Genus: Draco
- Species: D. quinquefasciatus

Binomial name
- Draco quinquefasciatus Hardwicke & JE Gray, 1827

= Draco quinquefasciatus =

Species of lizard

Draco quinquefasciatus, the five-lined flying dragon or five-banded gliding lizard, is a species of agamid lizard. It is found in Thailand, Indonesia, and Malaysia.
