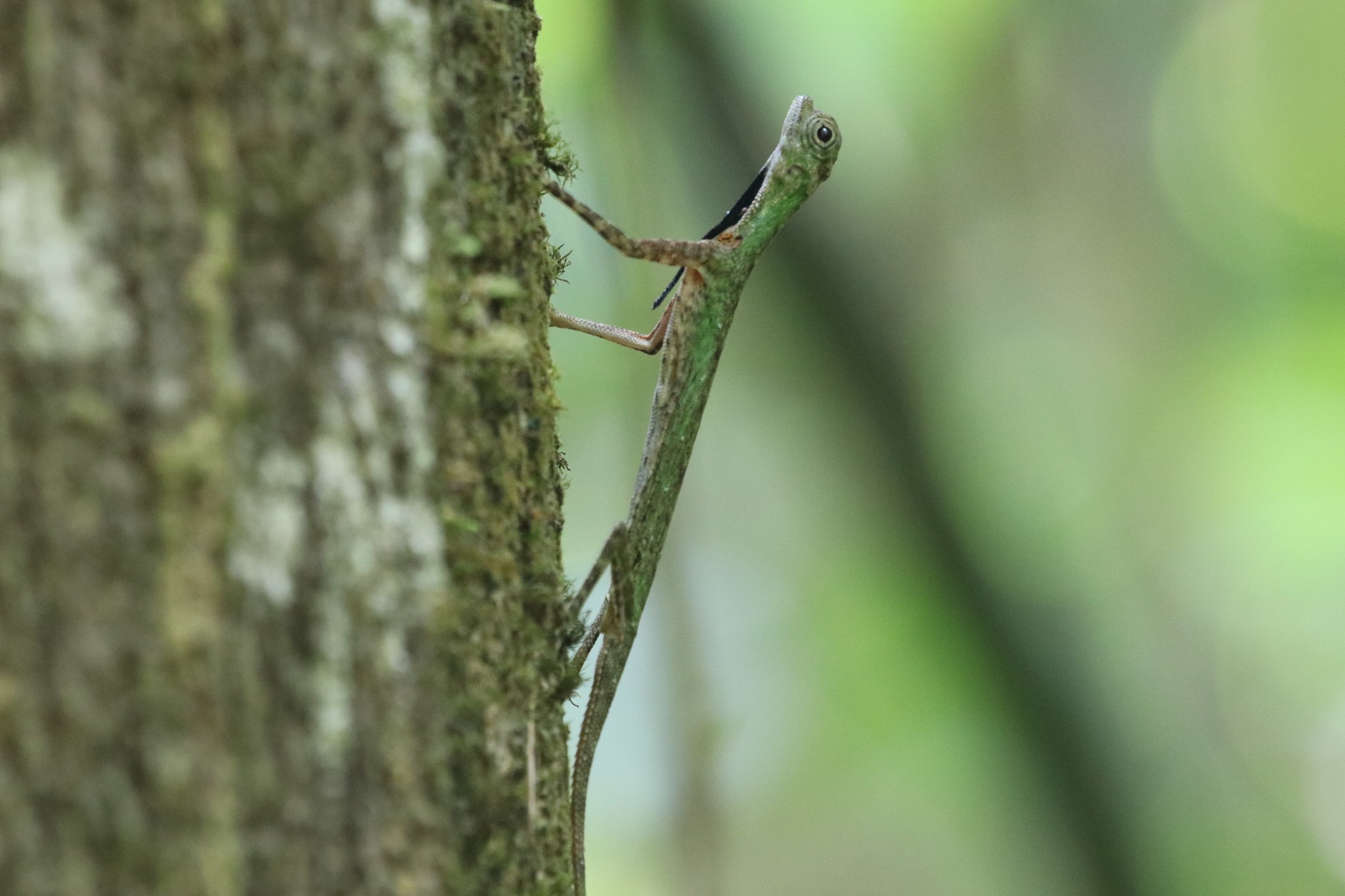

Scientific classification
- Domain: Eukaryota
- Kingdom: Animalia
- Phylum: Chordata
- Class: Reptilia
- Order: Squamata
- Suborder: Iguania
- Family: Agamidae
- Genus: Draco
- Species: D. melanopogon

Binomial name
- Draco melanopogon Boulenger, 1887

= Draco melanopogon =

Species of lizard

Draco melanopogon, commonly known as the black-bearded gliding lizard or black-barbed flying dragon, is a species of agamid "flying lizard" endemic to Southeast Asia. It is a typically forest-dwelling arboreal lizard. It preys on small invertebrates like ants and is oviparous. They are notable for relying solely on dewlap-mediated communication, instead of conveying signals via both headbobbing and employing dewlaps, as is typical for lizards with dewlaps.
