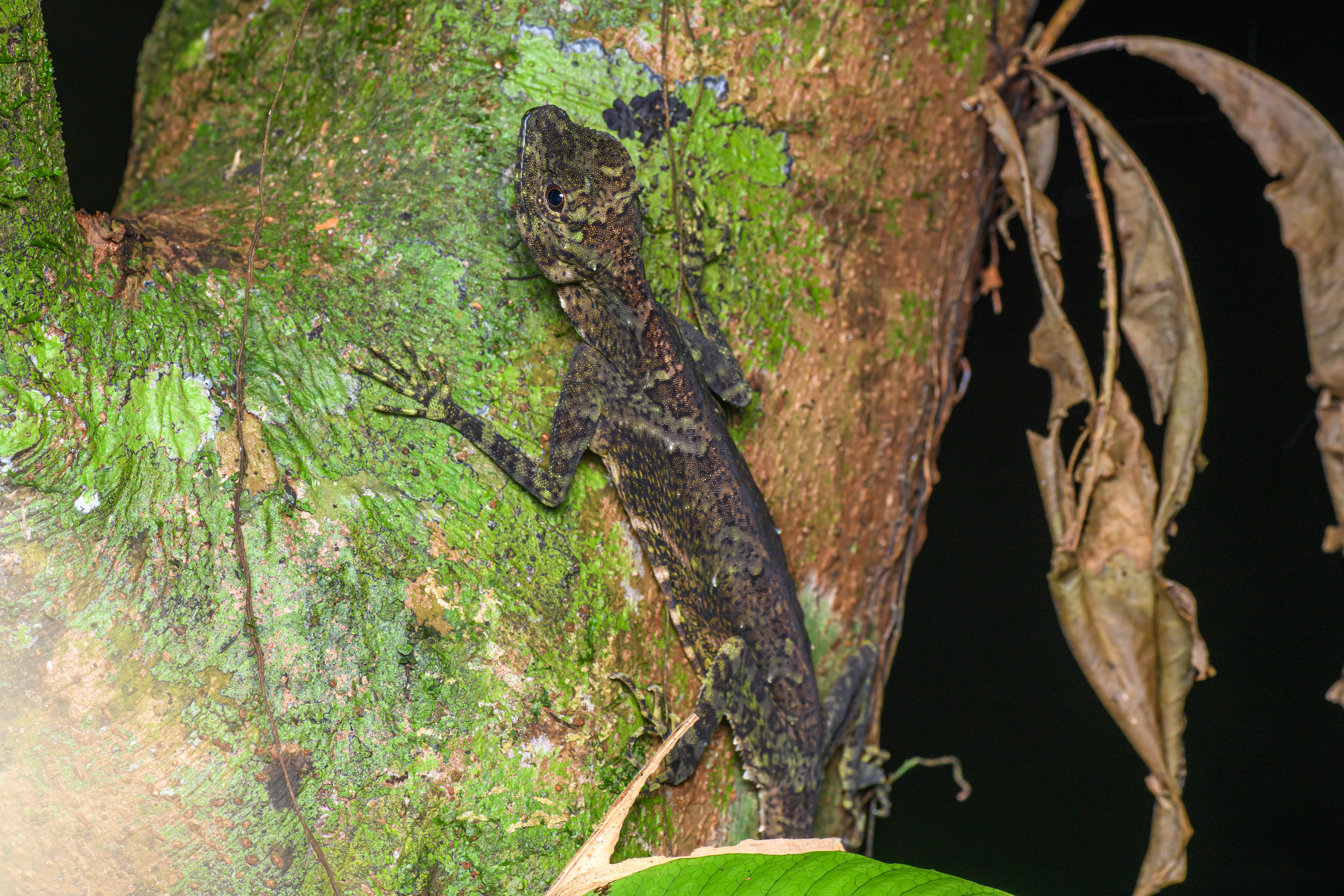

Conservation status
- Least Concern (IUCN 3.1)

Scientific classification
- Kingdom: Animalia
- Phylum: Chordata
- Class: Reptilia
- Order: Squamata
- Suborder: Iguania
- Family: Agamidae
- Genus: Draco
- Species: D. maximus

Binomial name
- Draco maximus Boulenger, 1893

= Draco maximus =

Species of lizard

Draco maximus, the great flying dragon or giant gliding lizard, is a species of agamid lizard. It is found in Indonesia, Thailand, and Malaysia.
