= Draco boschmai =

Scientific classification
- Kingdom: Animalia
- Phylum: Chordata
- Class: Reptilia
- Order: Squamata
- Suborder: Iguania
- Family: Agamidae
- Genus: Draco
- Species: D. boschmai

Binomial name
- Draco boschmai Hennig, 1936
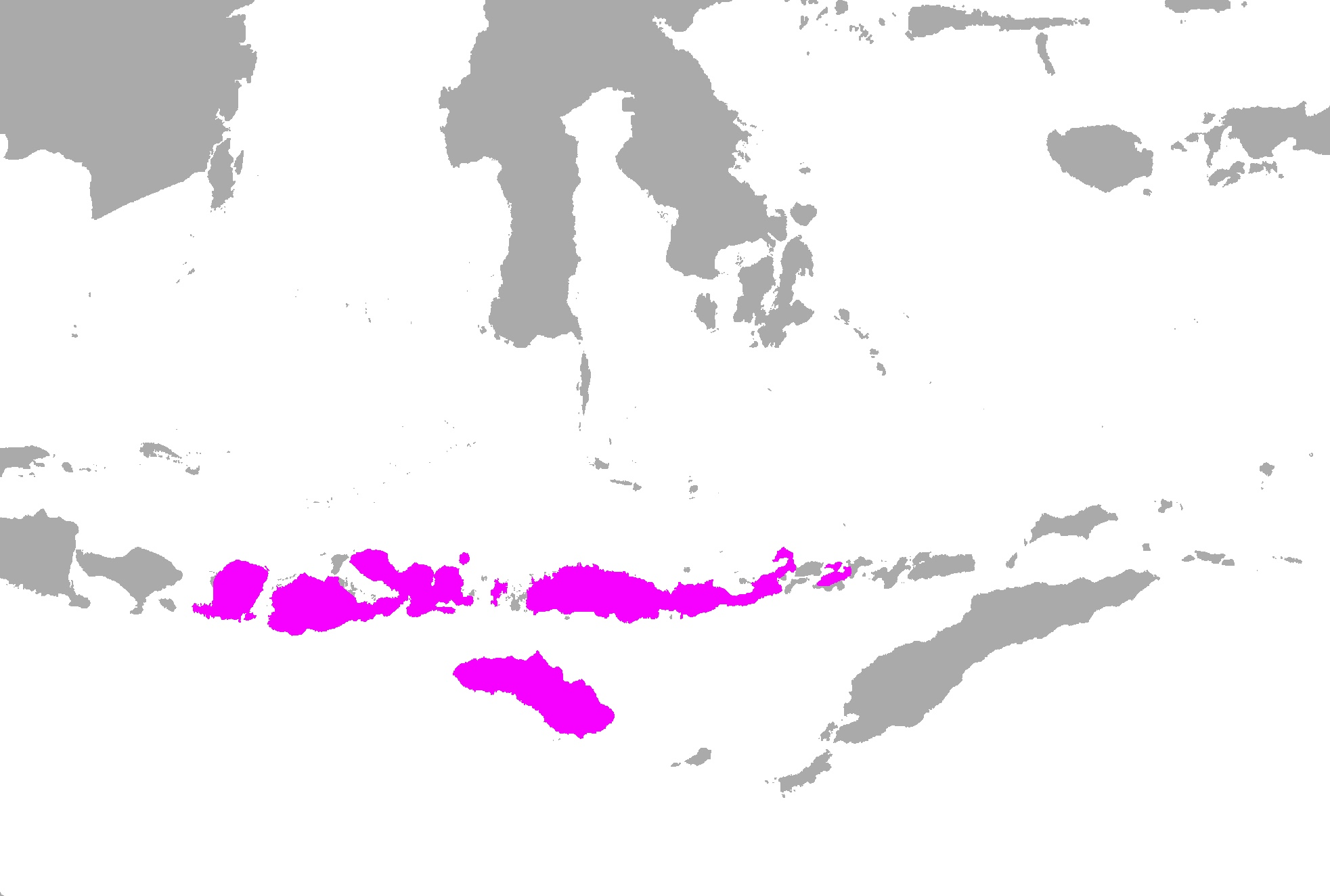

Synonyms
- Draco volans boschmai Hennig, 1936; Draco boschmai — McGuire & Kiew, 2001

Species of lizard

Draco boschmai is a species of lizard in the family Agamidae. The species is endemic to Indonesia.

== Etymology ==
The specific name, boschmai, is in honor of Dutch zoologist Hilbrand Boschma.

== Geographic range ==
Within Indonesia D. boschmai is found on the islands of Adonara, Flores, Komodo, Lombok, Rinca, Sulawesi, Sumba, and Sumbawa.

== Description ==
D. boschmai may attain a snout-to-vent length (SVL) of about 9 cm (3.5 in). The patagium is dark brown.

== Reproduction ==
D. boschmai is oviparous.
