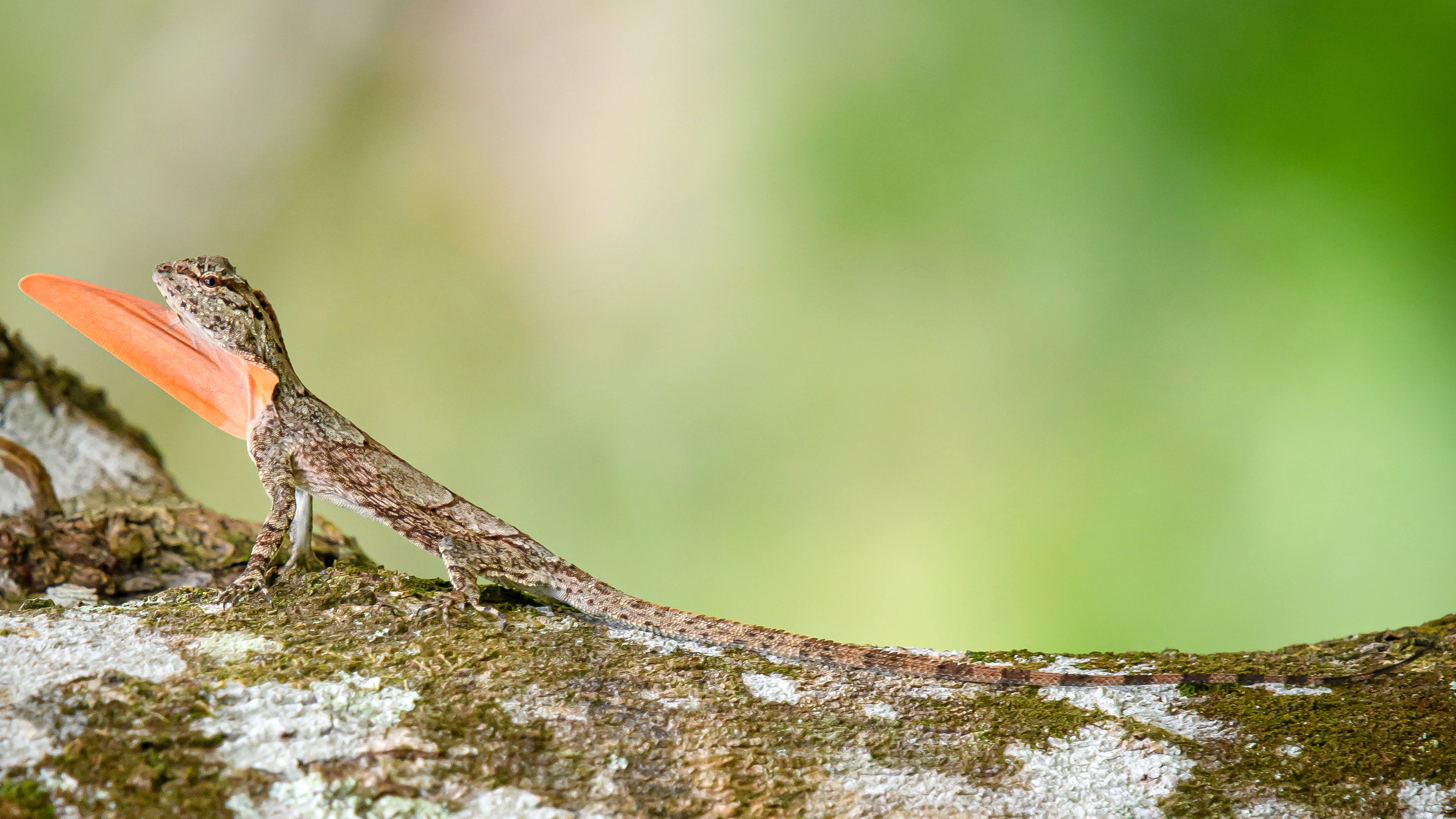

Scientific classification
- Kingdom: Animalia
- Phylum: Chordata
- Class: Reptilia
- Order: Squamata
- Suborder: Iguania
- Family: Agamidae
- Genus: Draco
- Species: D. abbreviatus

Binomial name
- Draco abbreviatus Hardwicke & JE Gray, 1827

= Draco abbreviatus =

Species of lizard

Draco abbreviatus, the Singapore flying dragon, is a species of agamid lizard. It is found in Singapore and Malaysia.
