= Draco cristatellus =

Conservation status
- Data Deficient (IUCN 3.1)

Scientific classification
- Kingdom: Animalia
- Phylum: Chordata
- Class: Reptilia
- Order: Squamata
- Suborder: Iguania
- Family: Agamidae
- Genus: Draco
- Species: D. cristatellus

Binomial name
- Draco cristatellus Günther, 1872

Species of lizard

Draco cristatellus, the crested flying dragon, is a species of agamid lizard. It is found in Malaysia.
