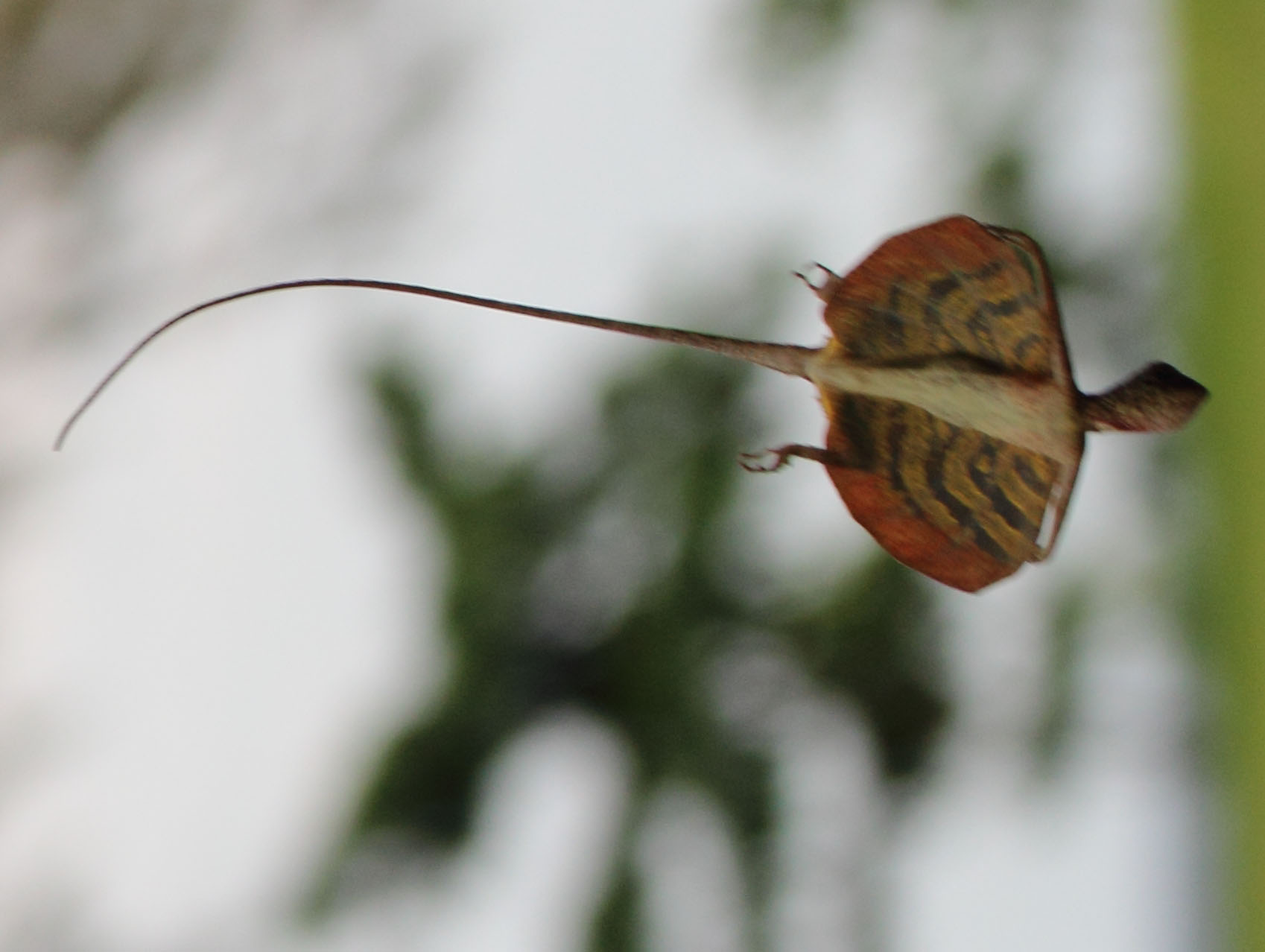
- D. taeniopterus in mid-glide, on Bulon Island, Thailand
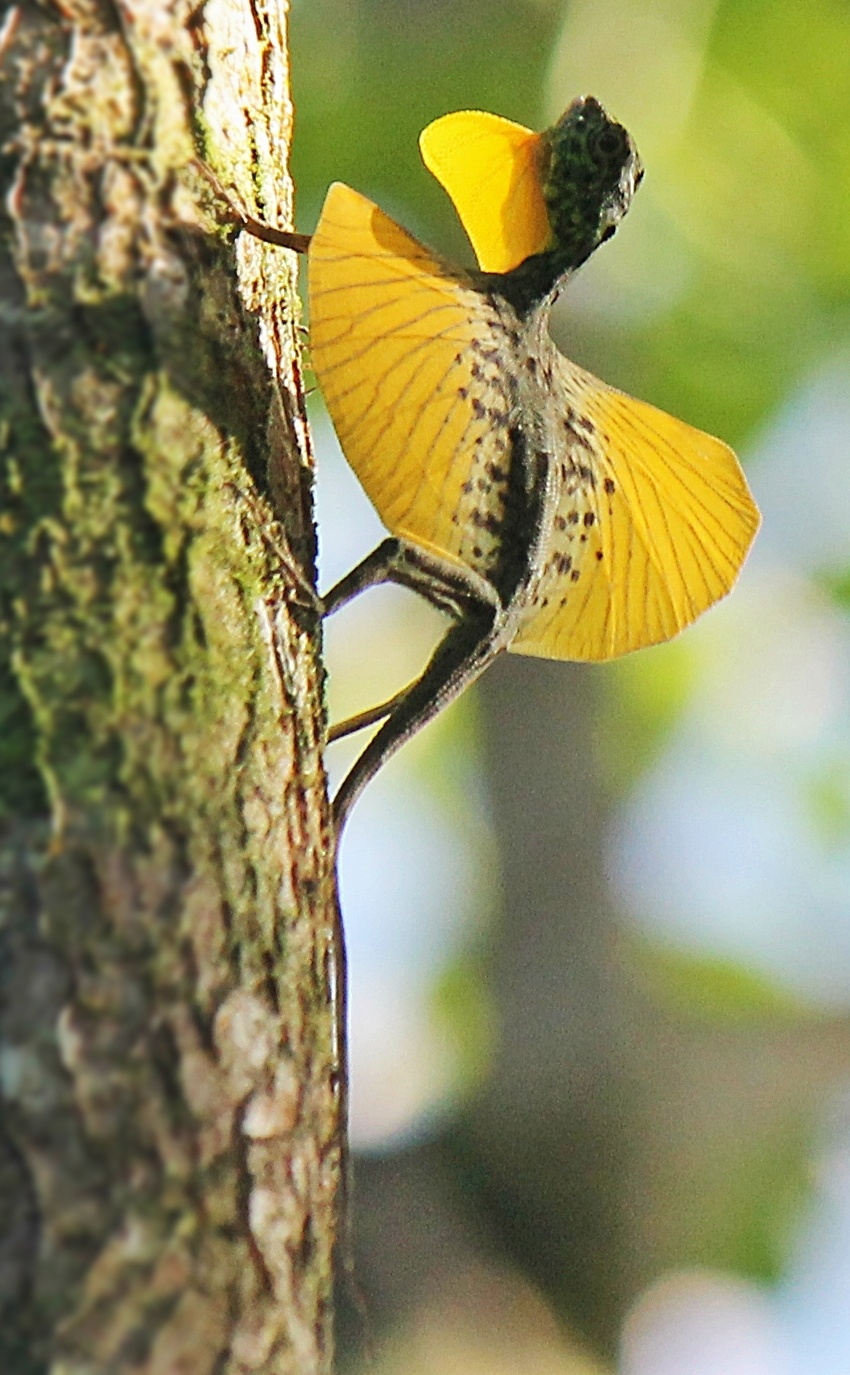
- Male D. spilonotus extending the dewlap (throat flap) and patagia ("wings") in Sulawesi, Indonesia

Scientific classification
- Kingdom: Animalia
- Phylum: Chordata
- Class: Reptilia
- Order: Squamata
- Suborder: Iguania
- Family: Agamidae
- Subfamily: Draconinae
- Genus: Draco; Linnaeus, 1758

Species
- 41 species (see text)

= Draco (lizard) =

Genus of lizards

Draco is a genus of agamid lizards that are also known as flying lizards, flying dragons or gliding lizards. These lizards are capable of gliding flight via membranes that may be extended to create wings (patagia), formed by a support structure from an enlarged set of ribs. They are arboreal insectivores.

While not capable of powered flight they often obtain lift in the course of their gliding flights. Glides as long as 60 m (200 ft) have been recorded, over which the animal loses only 10 m (33 ft) in height which makes for a glide ratio of 6:1. This is done by a lizard of only around 20 cm (7.9 in) in total length, tail included. They are found across Southeast Asia and Southern India and are fairly common in forests, areca gardens, teak plantations and shrub jungle.

== History of discovery and distribution ==
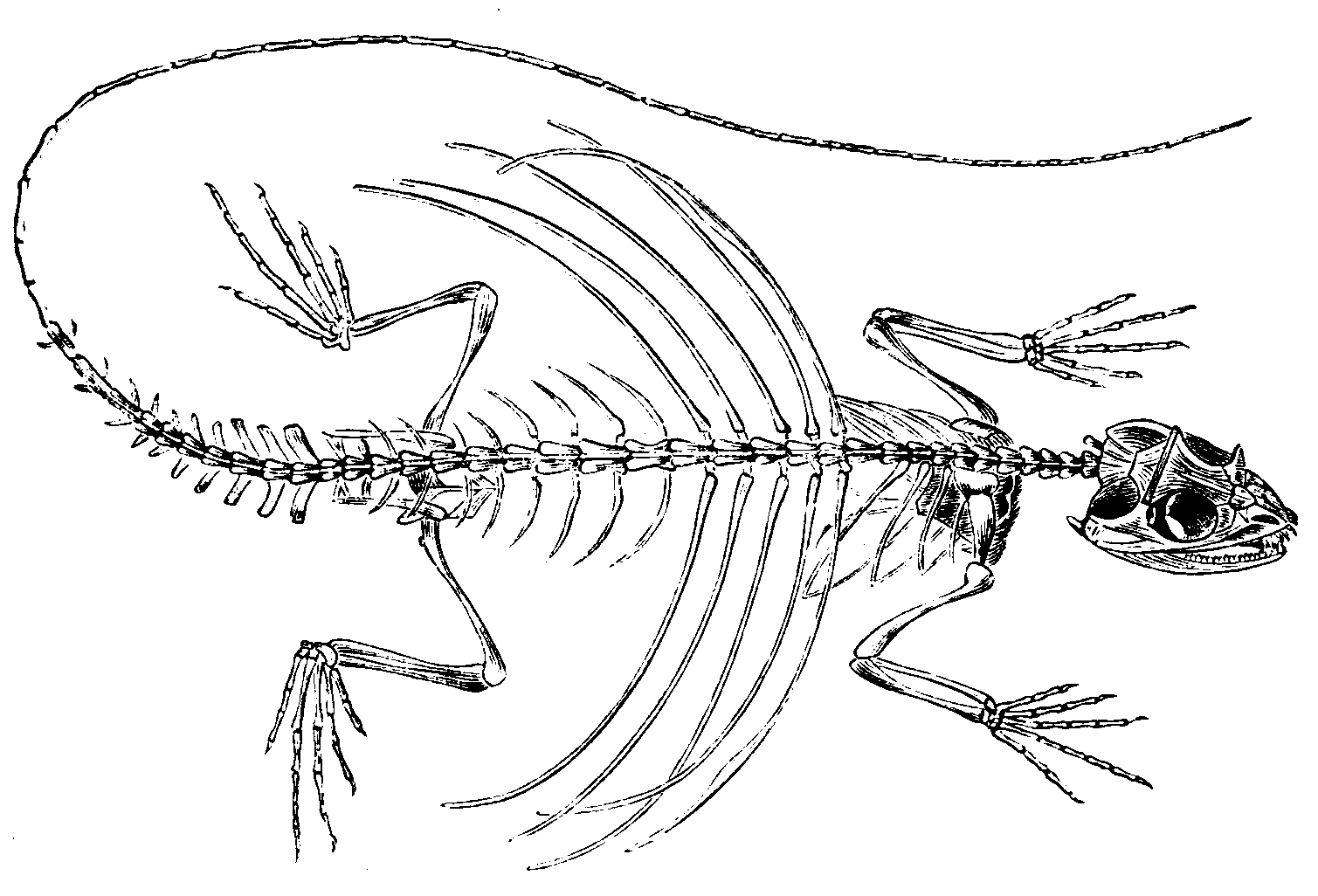
Skeleton of Draco

Carl Linnaeus described the genus in 1758, with the type species being Draco volans. The name of the genus is from the Latin term for dragons of mythology. Some scholars as late as the early-mid 20th century who had not seen the animal in person doubted its flight capabilities or whether the patagia played a significant role in the gliding, but research in the late 1950s firmly established the gliding function of the patagia.

Species of Draco are widely distributed in the forests of Southeast Asia, with one species, Draco dussumieri, inhabiting Southern India.

== Description and behaviour ==
The size of Draco species varies substantially, with adults ranging from 3 grams (0.11 oz) to over 35 grams (1.2 oz) in body mass, and from 15–40 centimetres (5.9–15.7 in) in total length (or 6–15 centimetres (2.4–5.9 in) including only the head and body, a measurement called the snout-vent length). They are sexually dimorphic, with females being larger than males. They are insectivorous, primarily feeding on eusocial insects such as ants and termites. Members of Draco are primarily arboreal, inhabiting tropical rainforests, and are almost never found on the forest floor. The colour of the patagium is strongly correlated to the colour of falling leaves in their range, which complements their cryptic camouflage resembling tree bark; both are likely to be camouflage against predatory birds.

=== Gliding ===
Takeoff and initial stages of gliding, slowed down 10x, showing the attachment of the forelimbs to the gliding membrane

Landing, slowed down 20x

The lizards are well known for their "display structures" and ability to glide long distances using their wing-like, patagial membranes supported by elongated thoracic ribs to generate lift forces. The hindlimbs in cross section form a streamlined and contoured airfoil, and are also probably involved in generating lift. Gliding is both used to escape predators, and as the primary means of moving through their forest habitat. The folding and unfolding of the membrane is controlled by the iliocostalis and intercostal muscles, which in other lizards are used to control breathing. At takeoff, the lizard jumps and descends headfirst, orientating itself so that the underside of the body is parallel to the ground. During flight, the back arches, forming the patagium into a cambered surface, and the forelimbs grab the front of the patagium, forming a straight front edge to the aerofoil. The forelimbs are used to manipulate the patagium in order to adjust the trajectory during flight. Maximum gliding speeds have been found to be between 5.2 and 7.6 metres per second, depending on the species. During the landing process, the glide is mostly horizontal. Immediately before landing, the forelimbs release the patagium. The landing is forefeet-first, followed by hindfeet. The shape of the gliding membrane does not correlate with body size, meaning the larger species have proportionately less lift-generating surface area and consequently higher wing loading.

=== Life history ===
Male D. dussumieri displaying for females by extending his dewlap, from Dandeli, India

Draco lizards are highly territorial, with the home range consisting of one or a few trees. The trees are actively guarded by males, with territory-less males searching the forest landscape in search of vacant areas. Experimental studies have determined that suitable unoccupied territories were claimed within a few hours of the removal of a dominant male. Females move freely through the territories. The patagium is used as a display structure during courtship and territorial disputes between rival males, alongside the opening of a brightly-colored dewlap that contrasts with their camouflaged body scalation. Males have a more prominently developed (more elongate) dewlap than females, as well as having crests on the tail (caudal) and cervical regions that are absent in females. The dewlap is translucent, and deliberately orientated perpendicular to the orientation of the sun during display in order to enhance visibility. The only time a female flying lizard ventures to the ground is when she is ready to lay her eggs. She descends the tree she is on and makes a nest hole by forcing her head into the soil. She then lays a clutch of 2–5 eggs before filling the hole and guards the eggs for approximately 24 hours, but then leaves and has nothing more to do with her offspring.

== Phylogenetics ==
Within Agamidae, Draco is a member of the subfamily Draconinae. Within Draconinae, Draco is most closely related to the genera Japalura and Ptyctolaemus.

=== Species ===
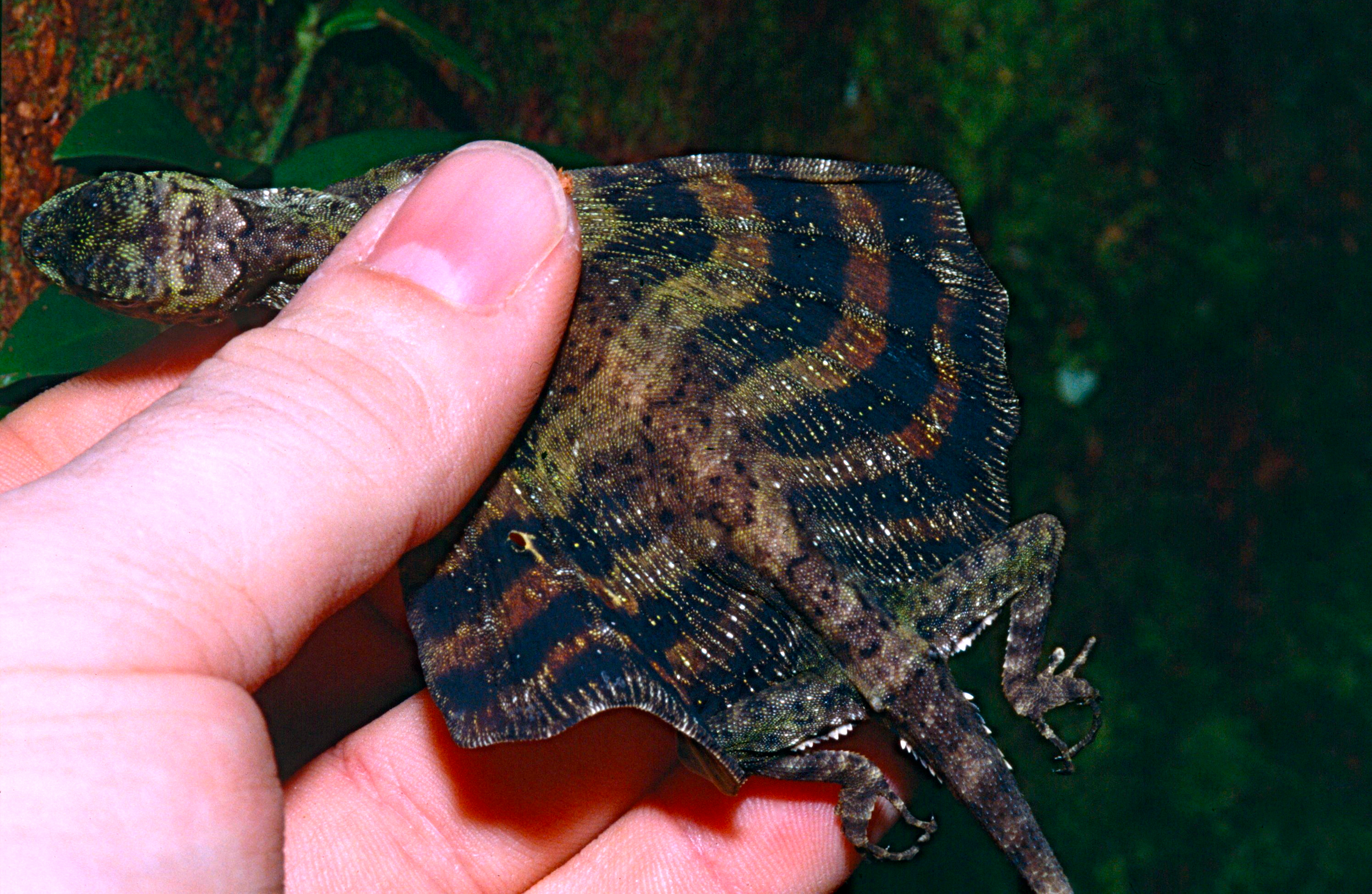
Size of D. quinquefasciatus in comparison to a human hand, from Sarawak, Malaysia

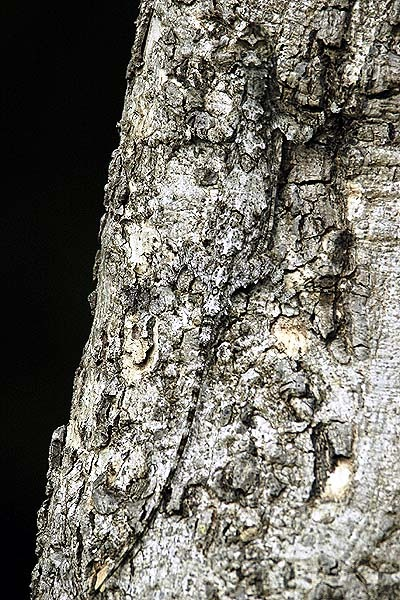
Highly camouflaged D. dussumieri from Bandipur National Park, India

The following 41 species are recognized:

- Draco abbreviatus Hardwicke & Gray, 1827 – Singapore flying dragon
- Draco beccarii W. Peters & Doria, 1878
- Draco biaro Lazell, 1987 – Lazell's flying dragon
- Draco bimaculatus Günther, 1864 – two-spotted flying lizard
- Draco blanfordii Boulenger, 1885 – Blanford's flying dragon, Blanford's flying lizard, Blanford's gliding lizard
- Draco boschmai Hennig, 1936
- Draco caerulhians Lazell, 1992
- Draco cornutus Günther, 1864
- Draco cristatellus Günther, 1872 – crested flying dragon
- Draco cyanopterus W. Peters, 1867
- Draco dussumieri A.M.C. Duméril & Bibron, 1837 – Indian flying lizard, Western Ghats flying lizard, southern flying lizard
- Draco fimbriatus Kuhl, 1820 – fringed flying dragon, crested gliding lizard
- Draco formosus Boulenger, 1900 – dusky gliding lizard
- Draco guentheri Boulenger, 1885 – Günther's flying lizard, Guenther's flying lizard
- Draco haematopogon Gray, 1831 – red-bearded flying dragon, yellow-bearded gliding lizard
- Draco indochinensis M.A. Smith, 1928 – Indochinese flying lizard, Indochinese gliding lizard
- Draco iskandari McGuire et al., 2007
- Draco jareckii Lazell, 1992
- Draco lineatus Daudin, 1802 – lined flying dragon
- Draco maculatus (Gray, 1845) – spotted flying dragon
- Draco maximus Boulenger, 1893 – great flying dragon, giant gliding lizard
- Draco melanopogon Boulenger, 1887 – black-bearded gliding lizard, black-barbed flying dragon
- Draco mindanensis Stejneger, 1908 – Mindanao flying dragon, Mindanao flying lizard
- Draco modiglianii Vinciguerra, 1892 – lined flying dragon
- Draco norvillii Alcock, 1895 – Norvill's flying lizard
- Draco obscurus Boulenger, 1887 – dusky gliding lizard
- Draco ornatus (Gray, 1845) – white-spotted flying lizard
- Draco palawanensis McGuire & Alcala, 2000
- Draco punctatus Boulenger, 1900 – punctate flying dragon
- Draco quadrasi Boettger, 1893 – Quadras's flying lizard
- Draco quinquefasciatus Hardwicke & Gray, 1827 – five-lined flying dragon, five-banded gliding lizard
- Draco reticulatus Günther, 1864
- Draco rhytisma Musters, 1983
- Draco spilonotus Günther, 1872 – Sulawesi lined gliding lizard
- Draco spilopterus Wiegmann, 1834 – Philippine flying dragon
- Draco sumatranus Schlegel, 1844 – common gliding lizard
- Draco supriatnai McGuire et al., 2007
- Draco taeniopterus Günther, 1861 – Thai flying dragon, barred flying dragon, barred gliding lizard
- Draco timoriensis Kuhl, 1820 – Timor flying dragon
- Draco volans Linnaeus, 1758 – common flying dragon
- Draco walkeri Boulenger, 1891

Nota bene: a binomial authority in parentheses indicates that the species was originally described in a genus other than Draco.

== Similar prehistoric reptiles ==
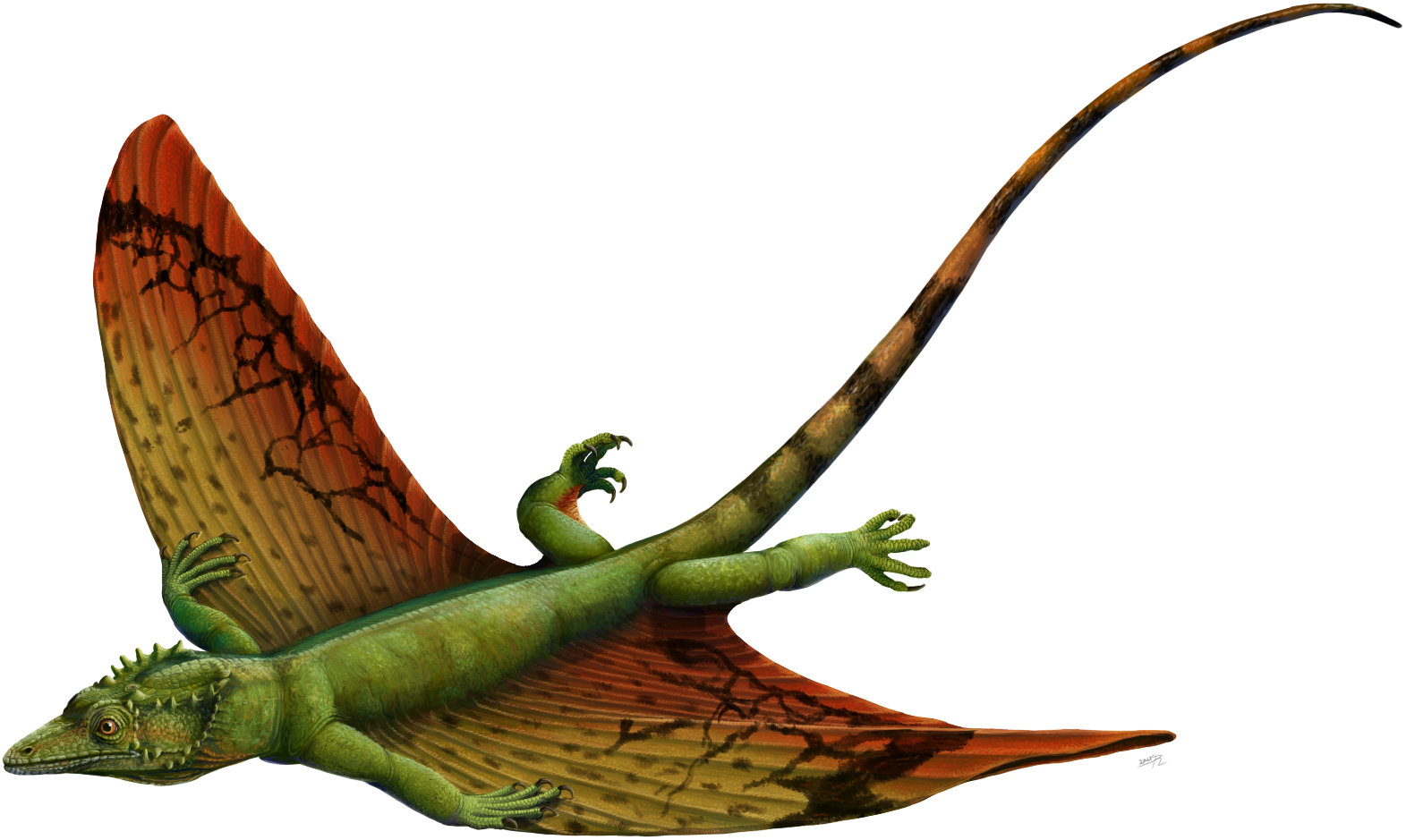
Life restoration of the weigeltisaurid Weigeltisaurus jaekeli, one of the oldest known gliding reptiles

Size comparison of Draco volans (purple, bottom right) to various unrelated prehistoric gliding reptiles (Weigeltisauridae, Kuehneosauridae, Mecistotrachelos, Xianglong)

Several other lineages of reptile known from the fossil record have convergently evolved similar gliding mechanisms consisting of a wing supported by elongated ribs or rod-like bones; the weigeltisaurids are the oldest of these, living in the Late Permian from around 258 to 252 million years ago. Other lineages include the Triassic (252-200 million years ago) kuehneosaurids and Mecistotrachelos, and the Cretaceous (~120 million years ago) lizard Xianglong.

== See also ==
- Flying and gliding animals
- Chrysopelea gliding snake
