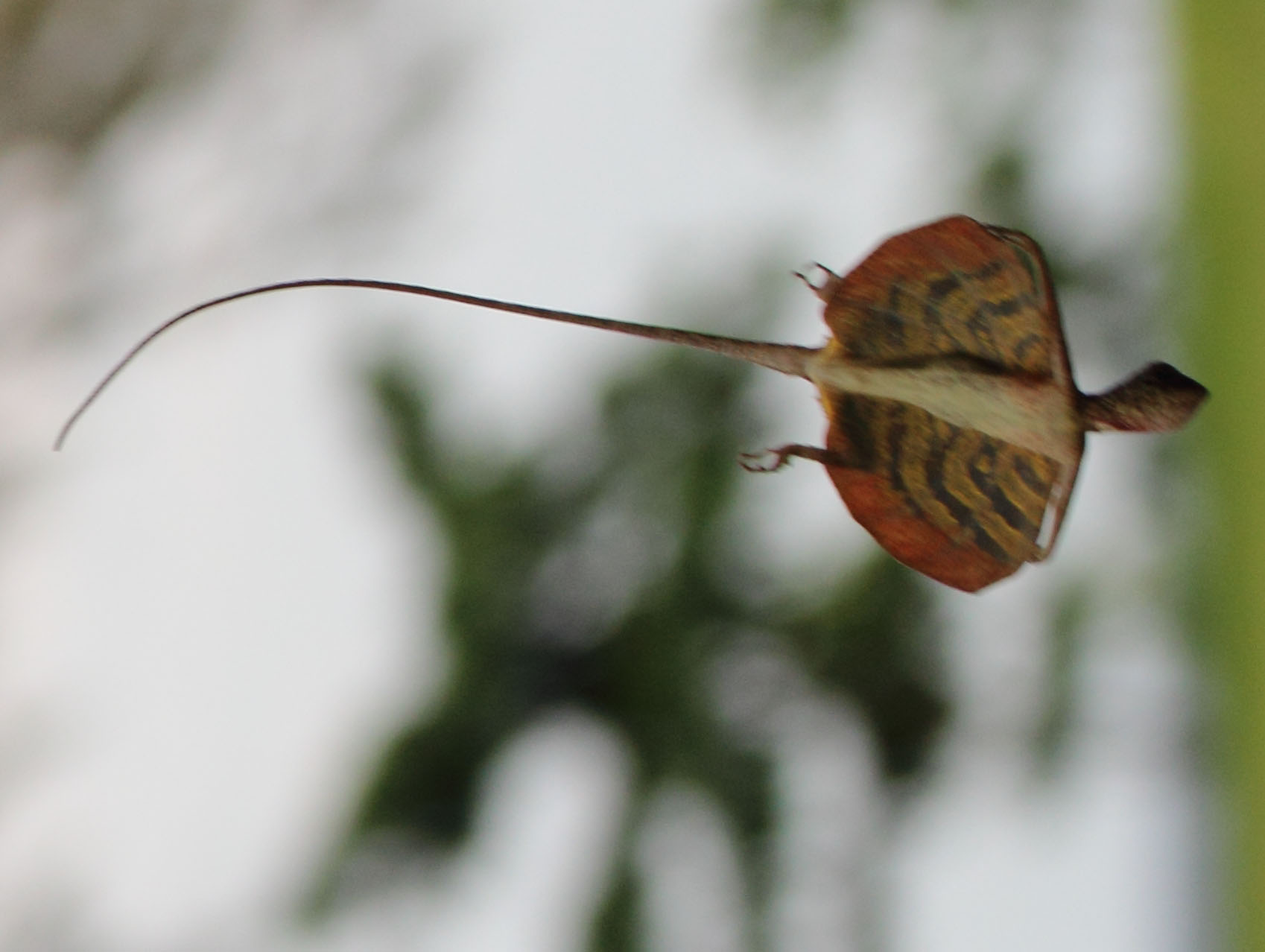

Conservation status
- Least Concern (IUCN 3.1)

Scientific classification
- Kingdom: Animalia
- Phylum: Chordata
- Class: Reptilia
- Order: Squamata
- Suborder: Iguania
- Family: Agamidae
- Genus: Draco
- Species: D. taeniopterus

Binomial name
- Draco taeniopterus Günther, 1861
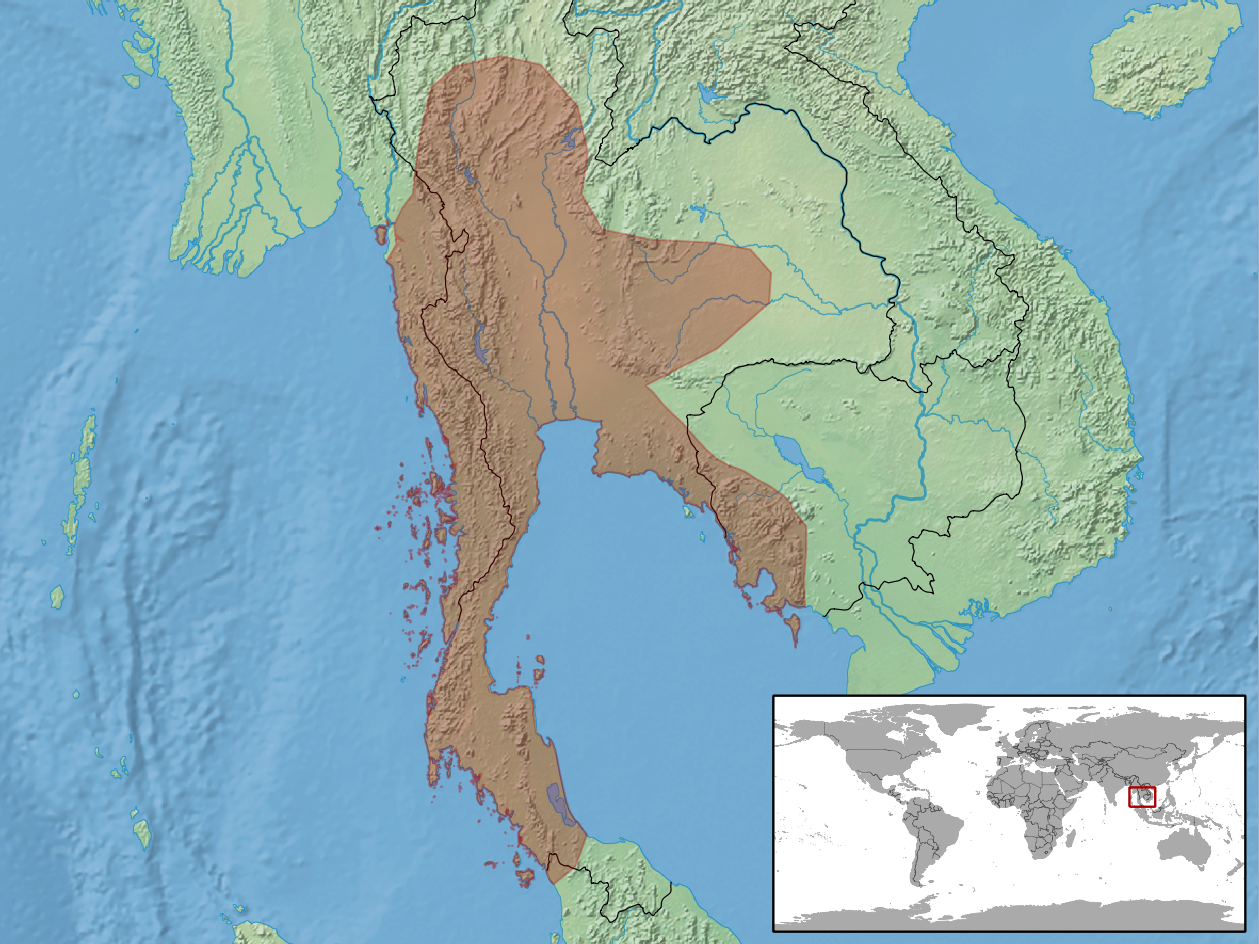

= Draco taeniopterus =

Species of lizard

Draco taeniopterus, the Thai flying dragon, barred flying dragon, or barred gliding lizard, is a species of agamid lizard. It is found in Myanmar, Thailand, Cambodia, and Malaysia.
