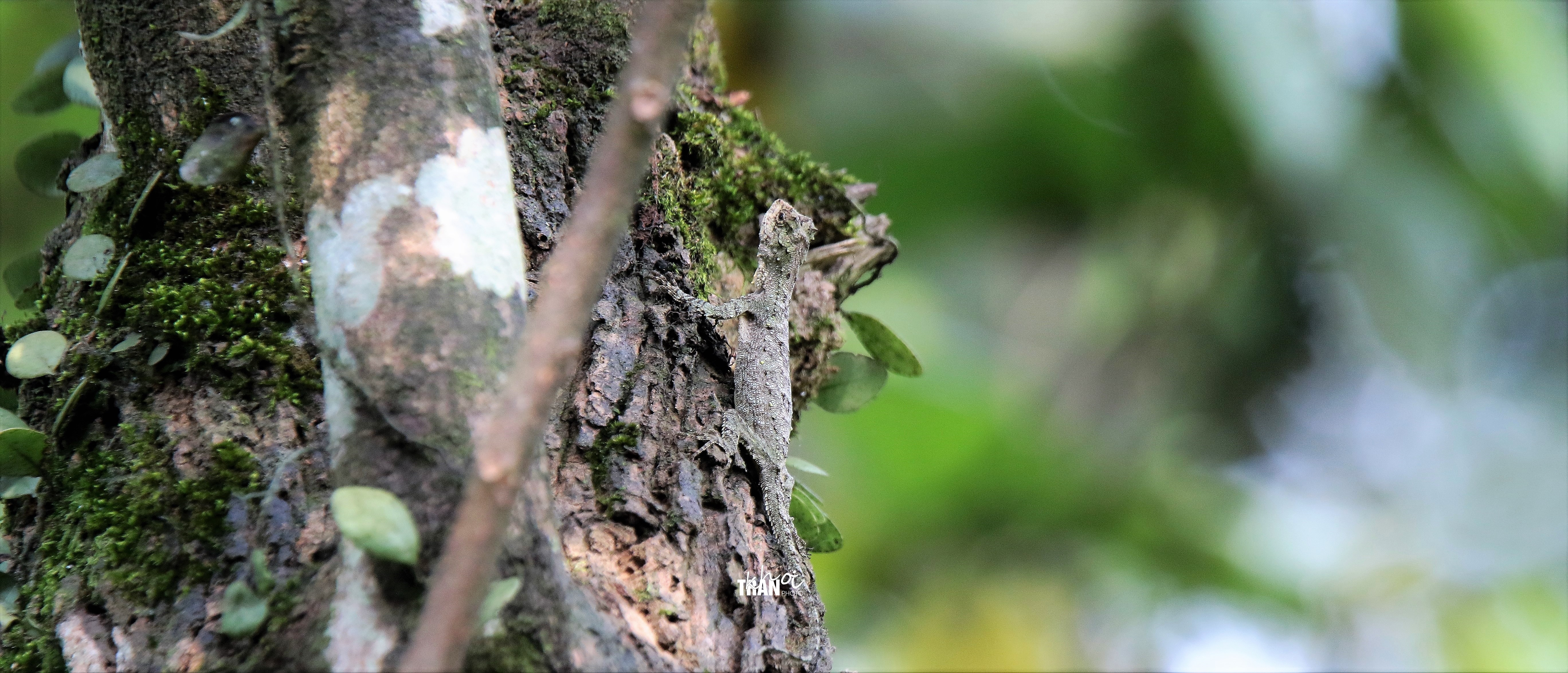

Conservation status
- Least Concern (IUCN 3.1)

Scientific classification
- Kingdom: Animalia
- Phylum: Chordata
- Class: Reptilia
- Order: Squamata
- Suborder: Iguania
- Family: Agamidae
- Genus: Draco
- Species: D. obscurus

Binomial name
- Draco obscurus Boulenger, 1887

= Draco obscurus =

Species of lizard

Draco obscurus, the dusky gliding lizard, is a species of agamid lizard. It is found in Indonesia and Thailand.
