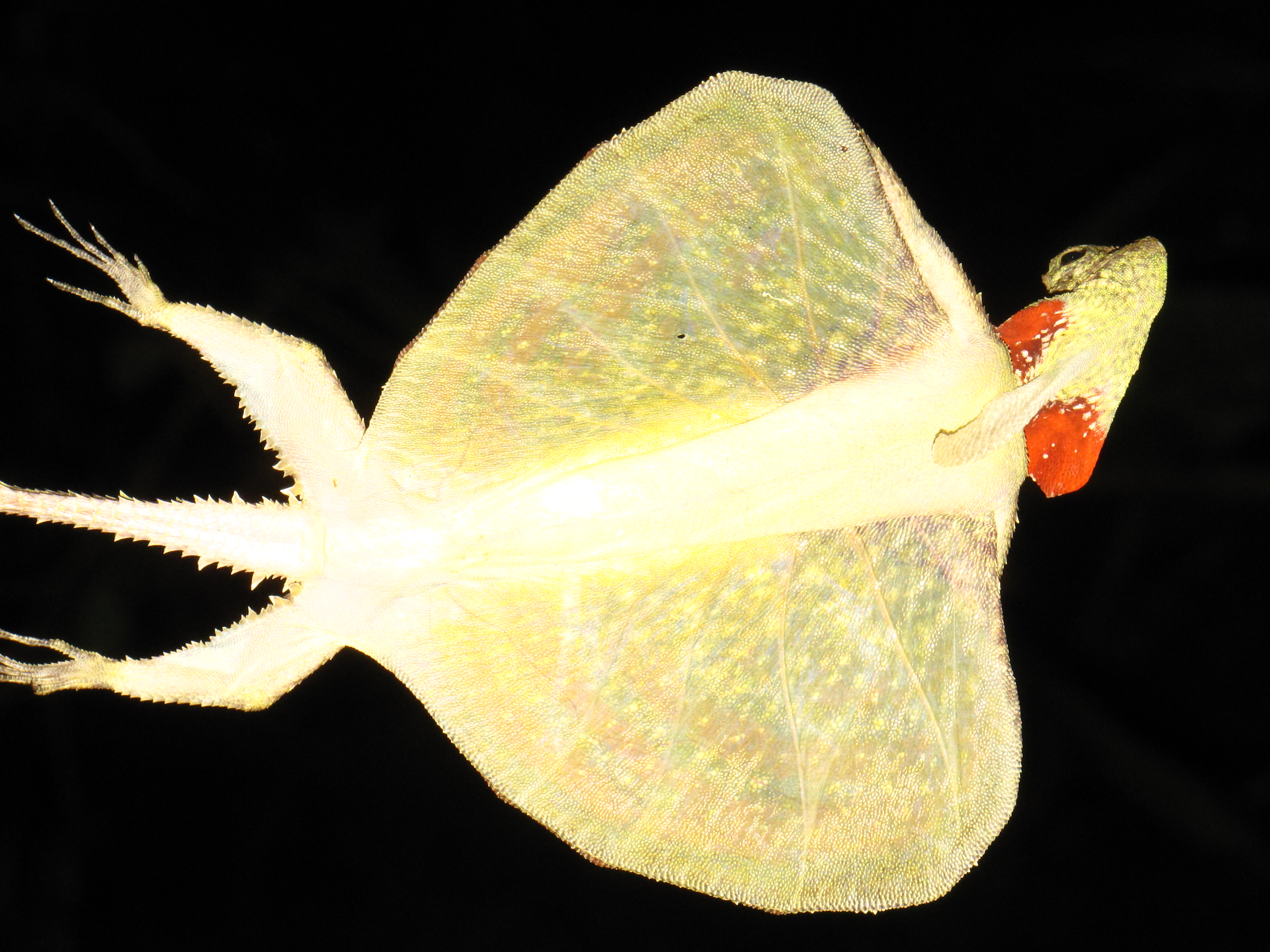

Conservation status
- Near Threatened (IUCN 3.1)

Scientific classification
- Kingdom: Animalia
- Phylum: Chordata
- Class: Reptilia
- Order: Squamata
- Suborder: Iguania
- Family: Agamidae
- Genus: Draco
- Species: D. norvillii

Binomial name
- Draco norvillii Alcock, 1895

Synonyms
- Draco blanfordii norvillii Alcock, 1895

= Draco norvillii =

Species of lizard

Draco norvillii, also known commonly as Alcock's flying dragon and Norvill's flying lizard, is species of lizard in the subfamily Draconinae of the family Agamidae. The species is endemic to India. It is capable of gliding from tree to tree, and has been recorded gliding up to 50 metres (160 ft). It feeds on insects and other small invertebrates.

== Etymology ==
The specific name, norvillii, is in honor F.H. Norville who was the collector of the holotype.

== Taxonomy ==
Musters (1983) examined specimens of Draco norvillii but was not able to examine the type. He opines that this lizard is a subspecies of Draco blanfordii. This view has not been endorsed in McGuire & Heang's (2001) study on the phylogenetic systematics of Southeast Asian flying lizards (Iguania: Agamidae: Draco).

== Geographic distribution ==
Draco norvillii has been recorded from Assam, Nagaland, and Arunachal Pradesh in NE India. A rare and endangered species of lizard, it was described by Alcock and named after the collector of the type (F. H. Norvill) of Doom Dooma, Upper Assam (now Arunachal Pradesh). The type locality may be considered restricted to "North-eastern India, possibly Doom Dooma (27.57°N 95.57°E), Arunachal Pradesh, northeastern India".

D. norvillii was recently rediscovered after 118 years in the Jeypore Reserve Forest by Mazedul Islam and Professor Prasanta Kumar Saikia of the Animal Ecology and Wildlife Biology Laboratory of the Zoology Department, Gauhati University in 2012. Two lizards were recorded.

== Description ==
Two individuals of Draco norvillii, a female and juvenile, were encountered in Jeypore Reserve Forest in 2012 during a survey by biologists from Gauhati University.

Islam & Saikia describe the specimens as follows :

- Head: Broader than its length. Tympanum partially scaled over. The nostrils are inclined towards the vertical. Nine supralabial scales.
- Body: Grayish above. Middle portion of dorsal part barred with light transverse lines. The neck and head regions were with greenish markings. The tail was with alternate white and black bands.
- Throat: The base of the gular pouch was scarlet in colour. Gular appendage of female is yellow in colour and shorter than the head in length.
- Patagium: Female – lower half red. Upper half black. Stippled with white and yellow broken lines and spots. Supported by 5 ribs on each side. Greyish upper side and orange lower half in juveniles.
- Belly: Yellow. No caudal crest present. Tail denticulated towards latter side.
- Hind limbs: Possessing thorny scutes.
- Measurements :
  - Length Snout to Vent: 68 mm (2.7 in)
  - Length Tail: 124 mm (4.9 in)
  - Distance between the armpit to groin: 34 mm (1.3 in)

== Reproduction ==
Draco norvillii is oviparous.
