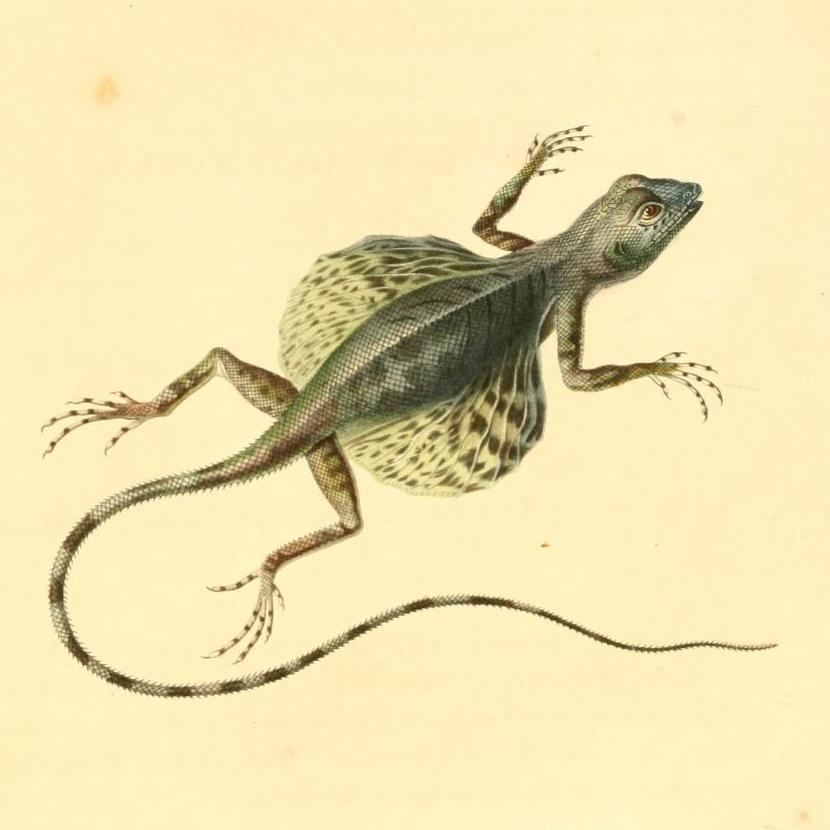

Conservation status
- Least Concern (IUCN 3.1)

Scientific classification
- Kingdom: Animalia
- Phylum: Chordata
- Class: Reptilia
- Order: Squamata
- Suborder: Iguania
- Family: Agamidae
- Genus: Draco
- Species: D. lineatus

Binomial name
- Draco lineatus Daudin, 1802
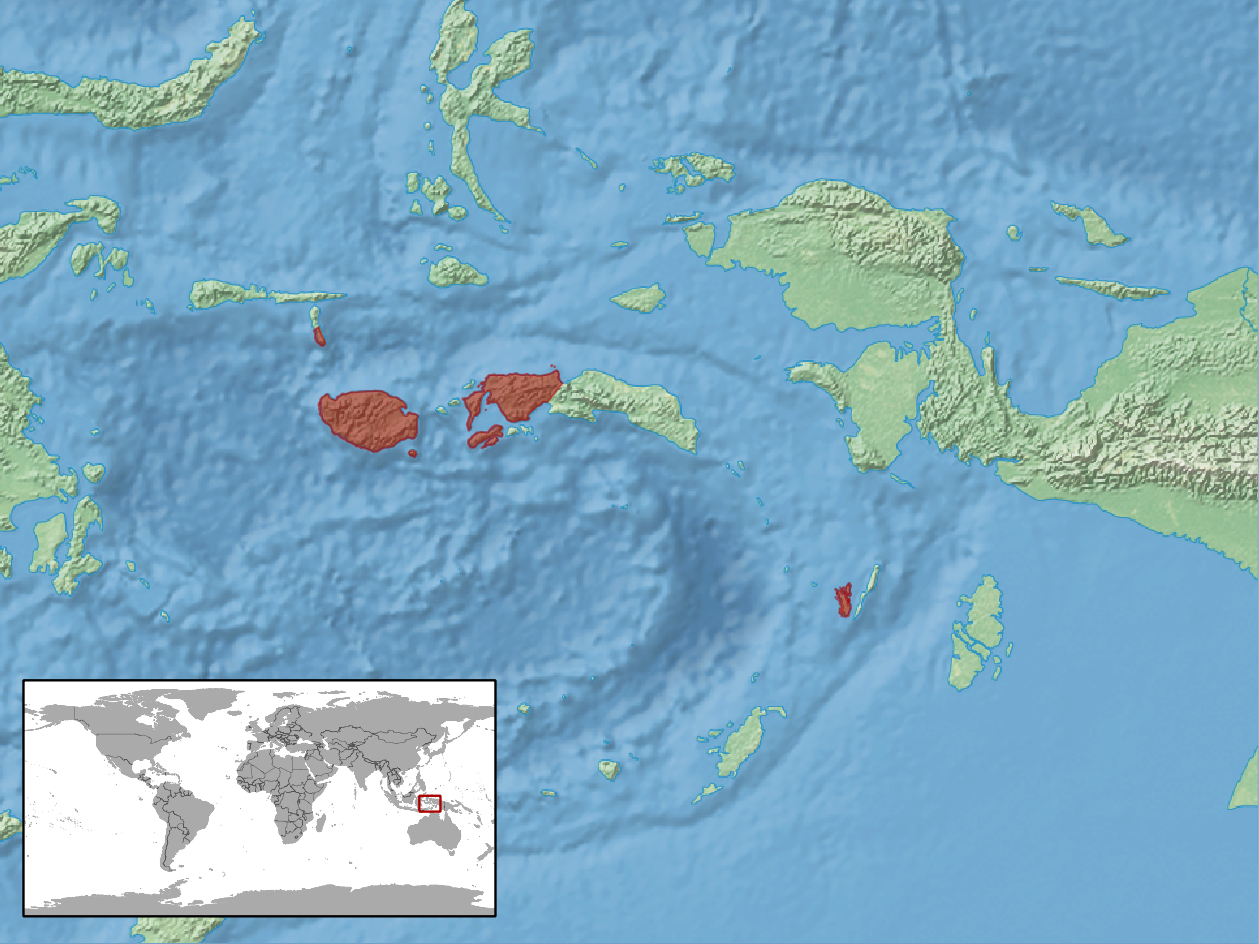

= Draco lineatus =

Species of lizard

Draco lineatus, the lined flying dragon, is a species of agamid lizard. It is found in Indonesia, the Philippines, and Malaysia.
