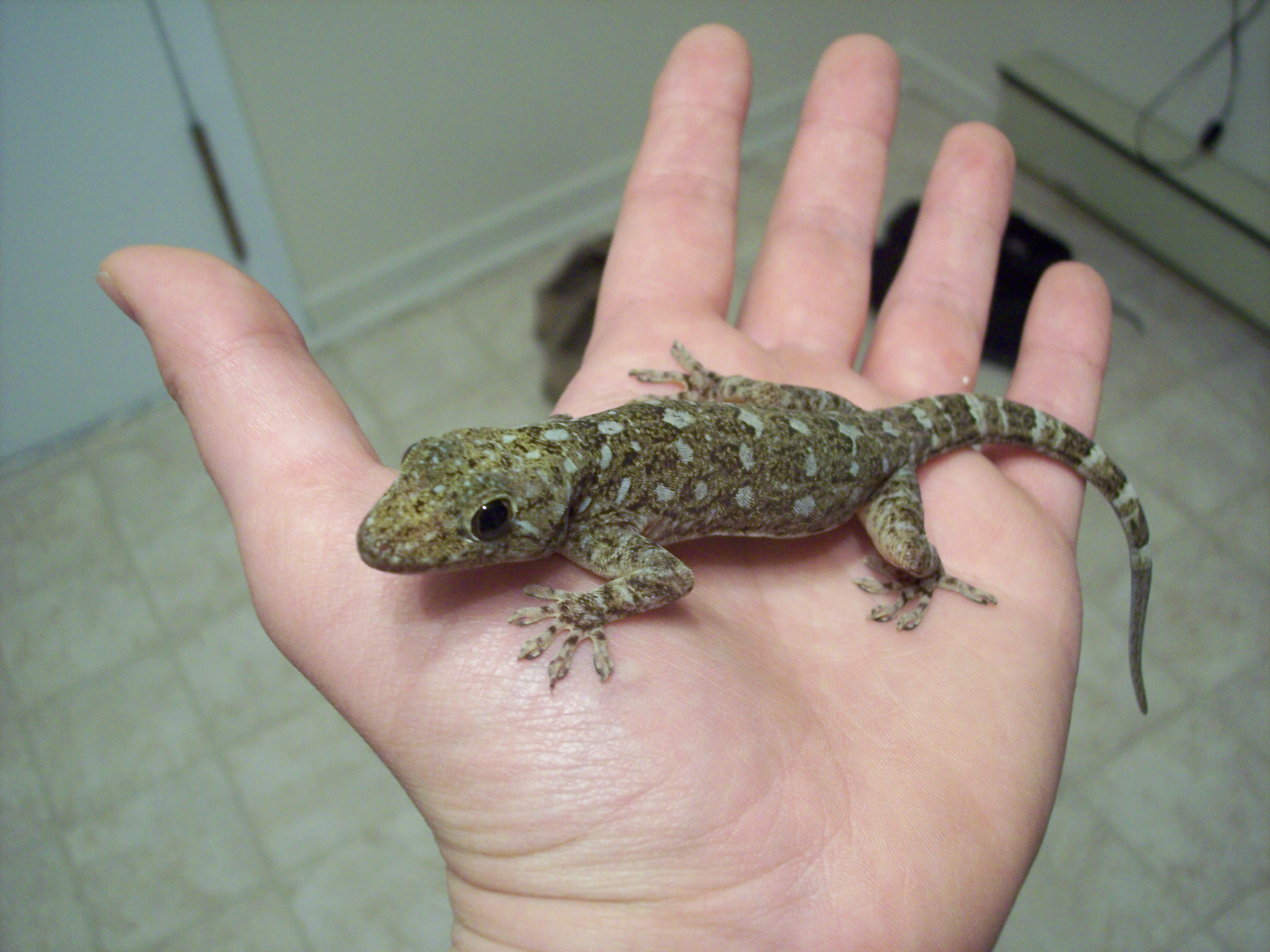

Conservation status
- Data Deficient (IUCN 3.1)

Scientific classification
- Kingdom: Animalia
- Phylum: Chordata
- Class: Reptilia
- Order: Squamata
- Suborder: Gekkota
- Family: Gekkonidae
- Genus: Gekko
- Species: G. grossmanni

Binomial name
- Gekko grossmanni R. Günther, 1994
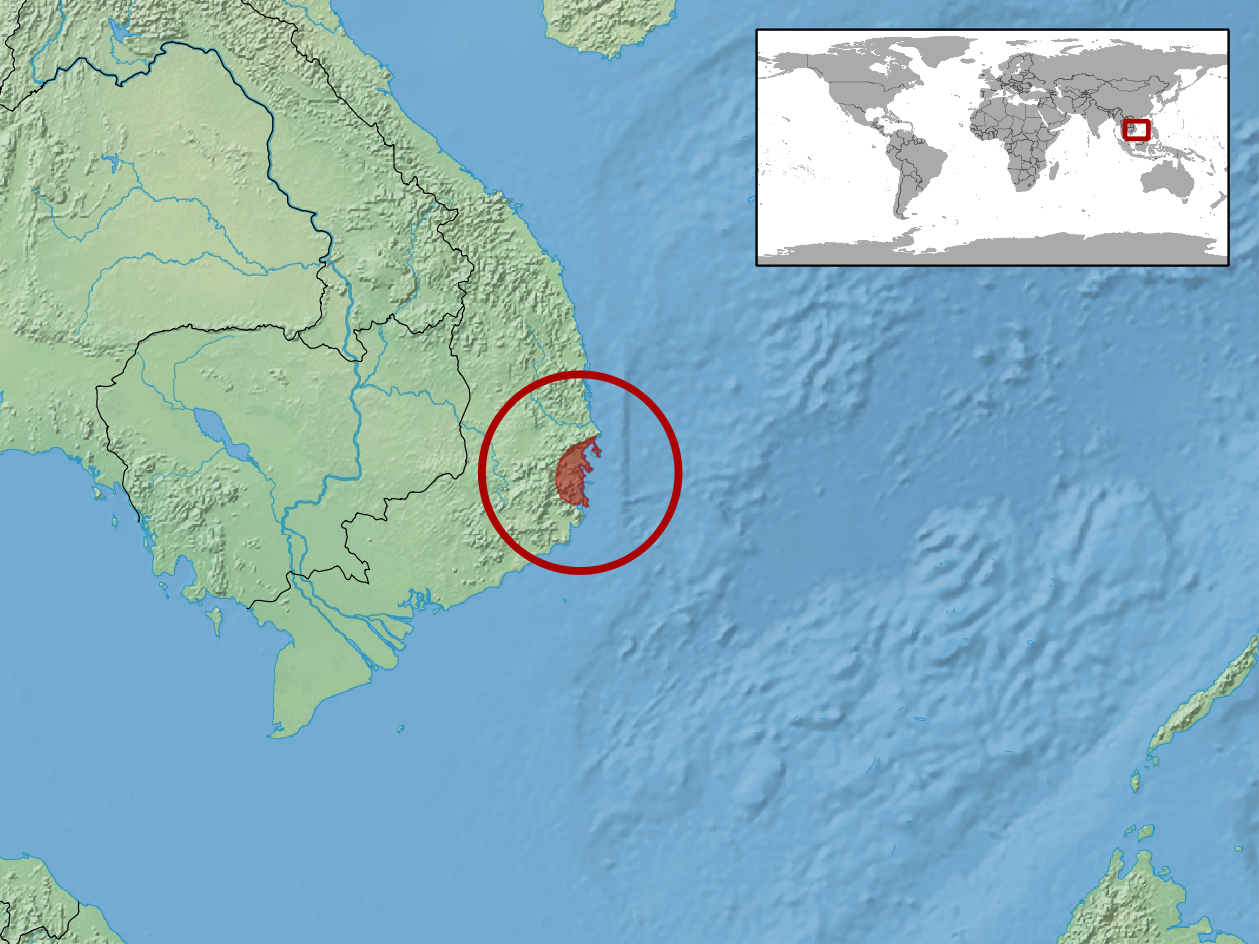

Synonyms
- Gekko grossmanni R. Günther, 1994; Gekko (Sundagekko) grossmanni — Wood et al., 2019; Gekko (Lomatodactylus) grossmanni – Wood et al., 2020

= Grossmann's gecko =

Species of lizard

Grossmann's gecko (Gekko grossmanni), also known commonly as the marbled gecko, is a species of lizard in the family Gekkonidae. The species is endemic to Vietnam.

== Etymology ==
The specific name, grossmanni, is in honor of German herpetologist Wolfgang Grossmann.

== Geographic range ==
G. grossmanni is found in Khánh Hòa Province, southern Vietnam.

== Habitat ==
The preferred natural habitat of G. grossmanni is forest, at altitudes from sea level to 200 m (660 ft).

== Reproduction ==
G. grossmanni is oviparous.

== Taxonomy ==
G. grossmanni is a member of the G. petricolus species group.
