= Gekko mizoramensis =

Scientific classification
- Kingdom: Animalia
- Phylum: Chordata
- Class: Reptilia
- Order: Squamata
- Suborder: Gekkota
- Family: Gekkonidae
- Genus: Gekko
- Species: G. mizoramensis

Binomial name
- Gekko mizoramensis Lalremsanga, Muansanga, Vabeiryureilai & Mirza, 2023

Species of lizard

Gekko mizoramensis is a species of parachute gecko, a lizard in the family Gekkonidae. The species is endemic to Mizoram state in India.

== Discovery ==
G. mizoramensis was discovered in the Indo-Burma region, in Lawngtlai town, in May 2022. Molecular evidence has shown a 7-14% uncorrected pairwise sequence divergence (p-distance) to its closest known relative, Gekko popaense, which lives on the other side of the Arakan hill range.

All the specimens of G. mizoramensis were found in the town area at heights of 1.5 to 3.6 m (4.9 to 11.8 ft) above ground, and became active at dusk, hunting insects that were attracted by light sources. Its habitat was also commonly populated by the lizards Calotes irawadi, Gekko gecko and Hemidactylus frenatus.

The discovery hints that northeast Indian biodiversity is not yet extensively documented.
