= Yunnan gecko =

Conservation status
- Least Concern (IUCN 3.1)

Scientific classification
- Kingdom: Animalia
- Phylum: Chordata
- Class: Reptilia
- Order: Squamata
- Suborder: Gekkota
- Family: Gekkonidae
- Genus: Gekko
- Species: G. scabridus

Binomial name
- Gekko scabridus Liu & Zhou, 1982
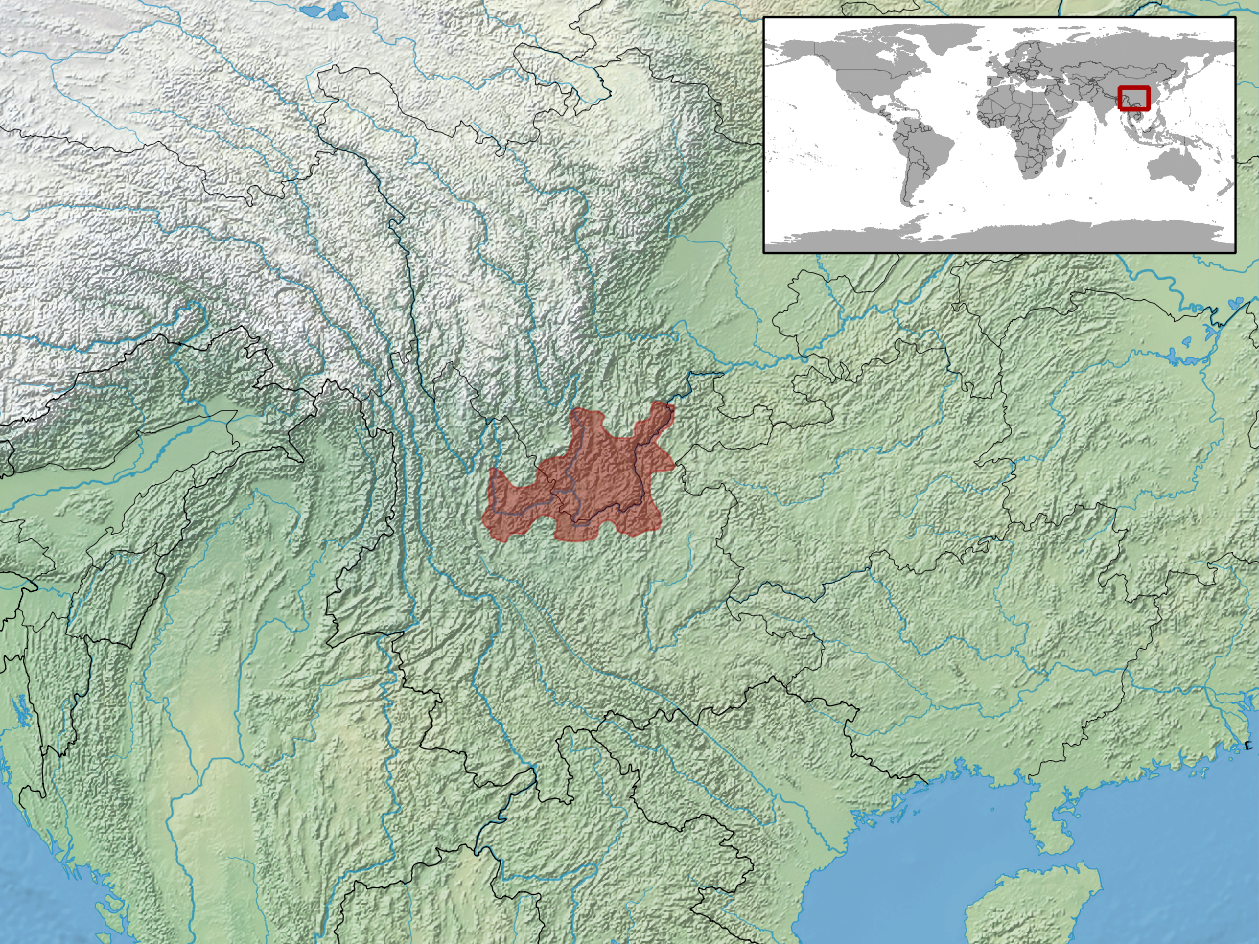

Species of lizard

The Yunnan gecko (Gekko scabridus) is a species of gecko. It is endemic to China. It is sometimes considered conspecific with Gray's Chinese gecko.
