= Aaron Bauer's gecko =

Conservation status
- Vulnerable (IUCN 3.1)

Scientific classification
- Kingdom: Animalia
- Phylum: Chordata
- Class: Reptilia
- Order: Squamata
- Suborder: Gekkota
- Family: Gekkonidae
- Genus: Gekko
- Species: G. aaronbaueri

Binomial name
- Gekko aaronbaueri Tri, Thai, Phimvohan, David & Teynié, 2015

Species of lizard

Aaron Bauer's gecko (Gekko aaronbaueri) is a species of lizard in the family Gekkonidae. Geckos as an overall family in comparison to other reptiles are known to be invasive. They were discovered to have emerged in a remote area known as Lom Yen Cave. They are endemic to Laos in which the remote region lies. The common name of the gecko "Aaron Bauer's Gecko" is derived from a well-known biology professor at Villanova University in the state of Pennsylvania (US). This species of gecko is closely related to five other species as well.

== Etymology ==
The specific name, aaronbaueri, is in honor of American herpetologist Aaron M. Bauer.

== Habitat ==
G. aaronbaueri is found in Khammouane Province, Laos. The preferred natural habitats of G. aaronbaueri are forest, caves, and rocky areas, at altitudes of 150–200 m (490–660 ft). Geckos live on all continents of the world except Antarctica. The terrain in this region consists of limestone mountains with lush forests and various caves. The specific isolated cave, Lom Yen Cave, where the species is found, is made up of the limestone in a remote, karst mountain in the range.

== Description ==
G. aaronbaueri is medium-sized for its genus. Maximum recorded snout-to-vent length (SVL) is 8 cm (3.1 in). This is different from average geckos that vary in lengths from 18 cm to 30 cm. The back side of this organism consists of about six off-white dots along the spine that are intermixed with yellow patterning, all of which extend from the neck to the base of the spine. On the sides of their bodies, there are groups of more off-white dots patterned with darker-colored markings outlined in yellow in the middle of limb attachments. This species of gecko also has approximately 100 rows of even flat scales on the dorsal side. Aaron Bauer geckos can also be described as rupicolas (associated with rocks). Due to the fact the species is also in the family Gekkonidae, this means the gecko has toe pads for scaling large rocks or any other surface.
