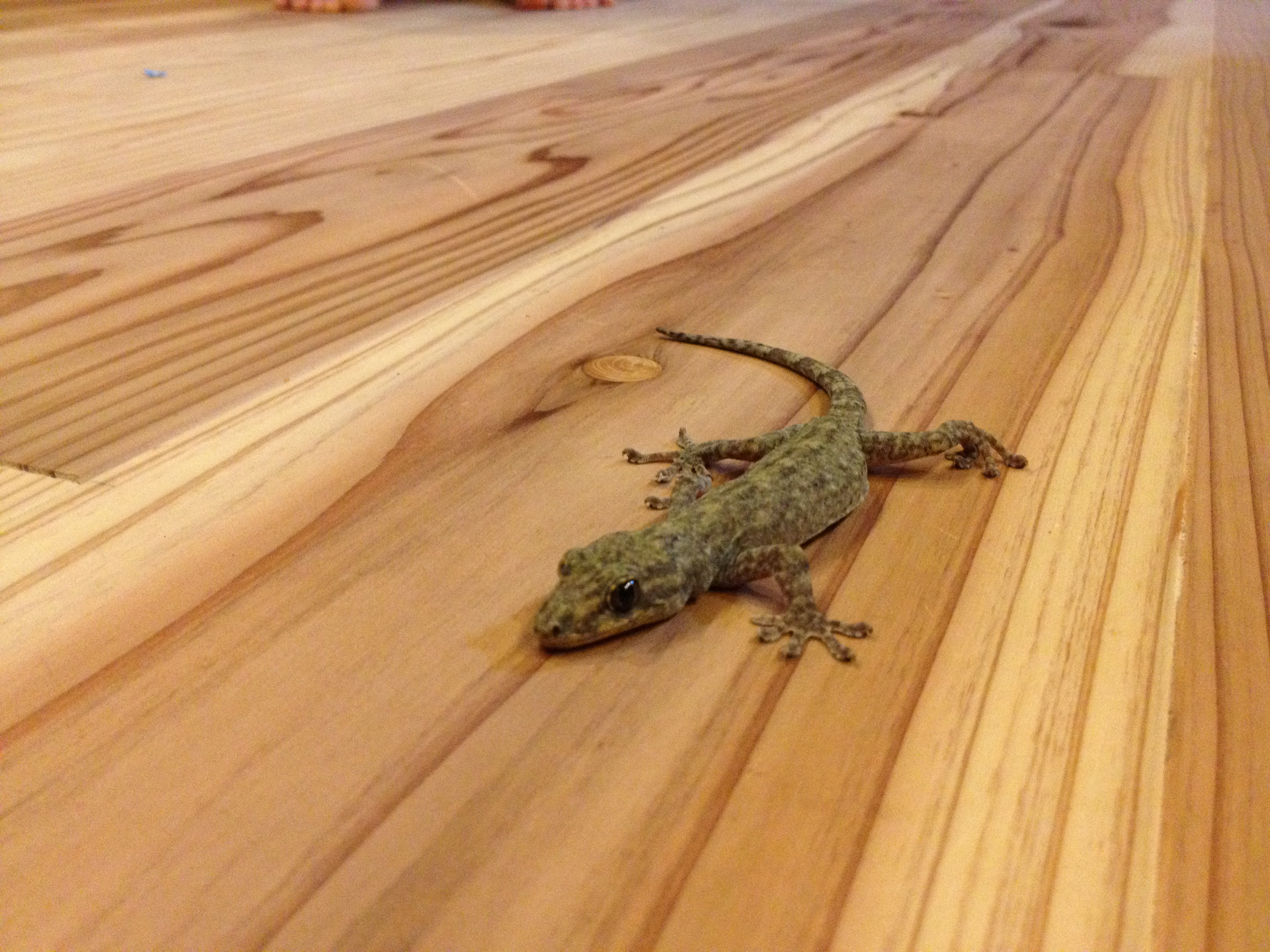

Conservation status
- Near Threatened (IUCN 3.1)

Scientific classification
- Kingdom: Animalia
- Phylum: Chordata
- Class: Reptilia
- Order: Squamata
- Suborder: Gekkota
- Family: Gekkonidae
- Genus: Gekko
- Species: G. yakuensis

Binomial name
- Gekko yakuensis T. Matsui & Okada, 1968

= Yakushima gecko =

Species of lizard

The Yakushima gecko (Gekko yakuensis) is a species of gecko. It is endemic to Japan, including the Ryukyu Islands.
