= Gekko trinotaterra =

Conservation status
- Least Concern (IUCN 3.1)

Scientific classification
- Kingdom: Animalia
- Phylum: Chordata
- Class: Reptilia
- Order: Squamata
- Suborder: Gekkota
- Family: Gekkonidae
- Genus: Gekko
- Species: G. trinotaterra

Binomial name
- Gekko trinotaterra Brown, 1999

Synonyms
- Ptychozoon trinotaterra

Species of lizard

Gekko trinotaterra is a species of gecko. It is found in Southeast Asia.
