= Truong's gecko =

Conservation status
- Data Deficient (IUCN 3.1)

Scientific classification
- Kingdom: Animalia
- Phylum: Chordata
- Class: Reptilia
- Order: Squamata
- Suborder: Gekkota
- Family: Gekkonidae
- Genus: Gekko
- Species: G. truongi

Binomial name
- Gekko truongi Phung & Ziegler, 2011

Synonyms
- Gekko truongi Phung & Ziegler, 2011; Gekko (Japonigekko) truongi — Wood et al., 2019

Species of lizard

Truong's gecko (Gekko truongi) is a species of lizard in the family Gekkonidae. The species is endemic to Vietnam.

== Etymology ==
The specific name, truongi is in honor of Vietnamese herpetologist Truong Quang Nguyen.

== Geographic range ==
G. truongi is found in southern Vietnam, in Khánh Hòa Province.

== Habitat ==
The preferred natural habitat of G. truongi is forest.

== Description ==
Medium-sized for its genus, G. truongi may attain a snout-to-vent length (SVL) of 9.6 cm (3.8 in).
