= Bonkowski's gecko =

Conservation status
- Vulnerable (IUCN 3.1)

Scientific classification
- Kingdom: Animalia
- Phylum: Chordata
- Class: Reptilia
- Order: Squamata
- Suborder: Gekkota
- Family: Gekkonidae
- Genus: Gekko
- Species: G. bonkowskii

Binomial name
- Gekko bonkowskii Luu, Calame, Nguyen, Le & Ziegler, 2015

Synonyms
- Gekko bonkowskii Luu et al., 2015; Gekko (Japonigekko) bonkowskii — Wood et al., 2019

Species of lizard

Bonkowski's gecko (Gekko bonkowskii), also known commonly as kap ke Bonkowski in Laotian, is a species of lizard in the family Gekkonidae. The species is endemic to Laos.

== Etymology ==
The specific name, bonkowskii, is in honor of German herpetologist Michael Bonkowski.

== Geographic range ==
G. bonkowskii is found in central Laos, in Khammouane Province.

== Habitat ==
The preferred natural habitats of G. bonkowskii are forest and caves, at an altitude of about 150 m (490 ft).

== Description ==
G. bonkowskii is medium-sized for its genus. Adult snout-to-vent length (SVL) is about 7 cm (2.8 in).

== Behavior ==
G. bonkowskii is nocturnal or crepuscular.

== Reproduction ==
G. bonkowskii is oviparous.
