= Gekko similignum =

Scientific classification
- Kingdom: Animalia
- Phylum: Chordata
- Class: Reptilia
- Order: Squamata
- Suborder: Gekkota
- Family: Gekkonidae
- Genus: Gekko
- Species: G. similignum

Binomial name
- Gekko similignum Smith, 1923

Species of lizard

Gekko similignum is a species of gecko. It is endemic to Hainan.
