= Gekko sorok =

Scientific classification
- Kingdom: Animalia
- Phylum: Chordata
- Class: Reptilia
- Order: Squamata
- Suborder: Gekkota
- Family: Gekkonidae
- Genus: Gekko
- Species: G. sorok

Binomial name
- Gekko sorok Das, Lakim, Kandaung, 2008

Species of lizard

Gekko sorok is a species of gecko. It is endemic to Sabah in Borneo.
