= Gekko athymus =

Conservation status
- Near Threatened (IUCN 3.1)

Scientific classification
- Kingdom: Animalia
- Phylum: Chordata
- Class: Reptilia
- Order: Squamata
- Suborder: Gekkota
- Family: Gekkonidae
- Genus: Gekko
- Species: G. athymus

Binomial name
- Gekko athymus Brown & Alcala, 1962
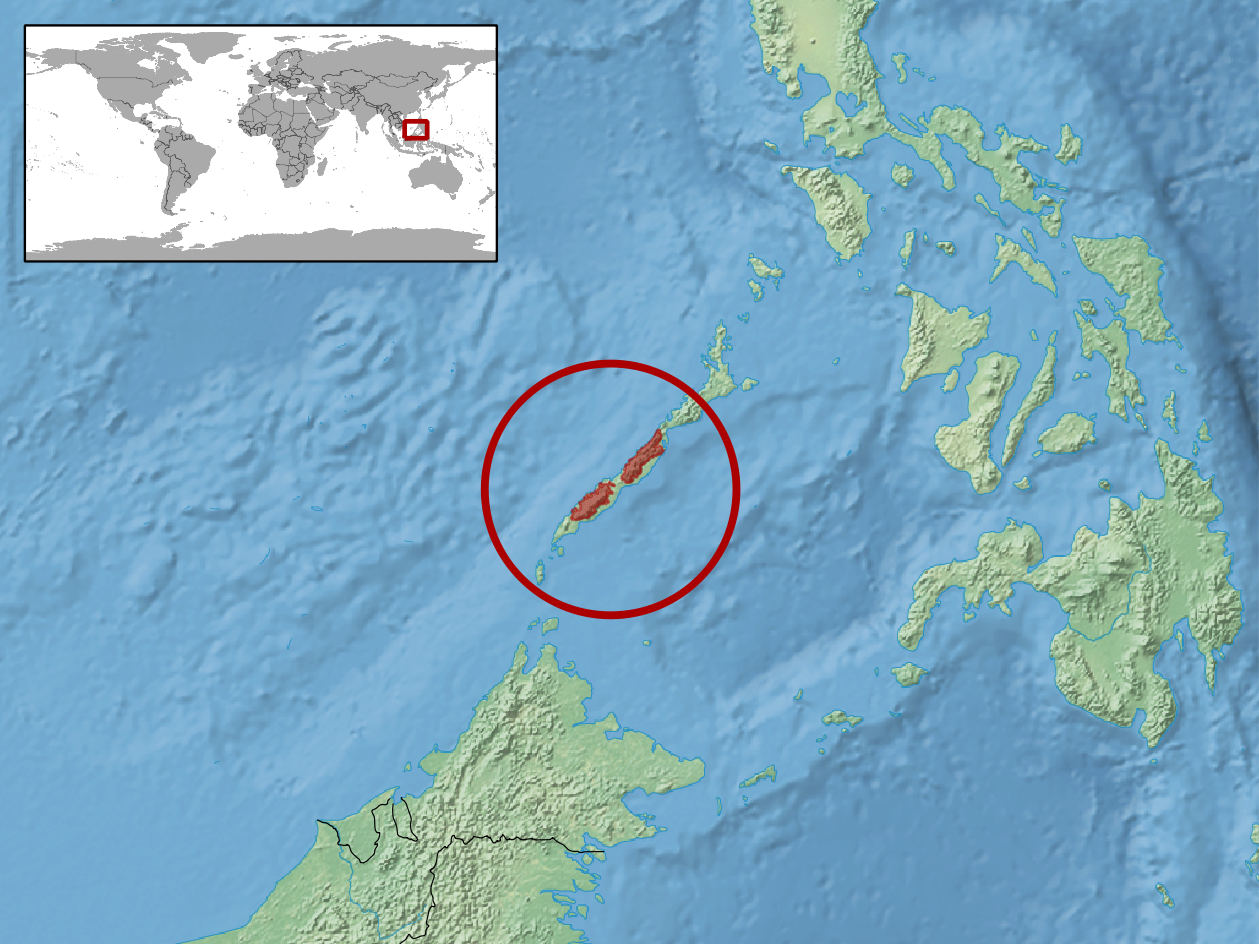

Species of lizard

Gekko athymus, also known as the Brown's gecko or smooth-scaled narrow-disked gecko, is a species of gecko. The species is endemic to the island of Palawan in the Philippines. It is a rare, crepuscular animal that has only been found in intact primary forest.
