= Kwangsi gecko =

Conservation status
- Data Deficient (IUCN 3.1)

Scientific classification
- Kingdom: Animalia
- Phylum: Chordata
- Class: Reptilia
- Order: Squamata
- Suborder: Gekkota
- Family: Gekkonidae
- Genus: Gekko
- Species: G. kwangsiensis

Binomial name
- Gekko kwangsiensis Yang, 2015

Species of lizard

The Kwangsi gecko (Gekko kwangsiensis) is a species of gecko. It is endemic to Guangxi Province in China.
