= Gekko intermedium =

Conservation status
- Least Concern (IUCN 3.1)

Scientific classification
- Kingdom: Animalia
- Phylum: Chordata
- Class: Reptilia
- Order: Squamata
- Suborder: Gekkota
- Family: Gekkonidae
- Genus: Gekko
- Species: G. intermedium

Binomial name
- Gekko intermedium (Taylor, 1915)
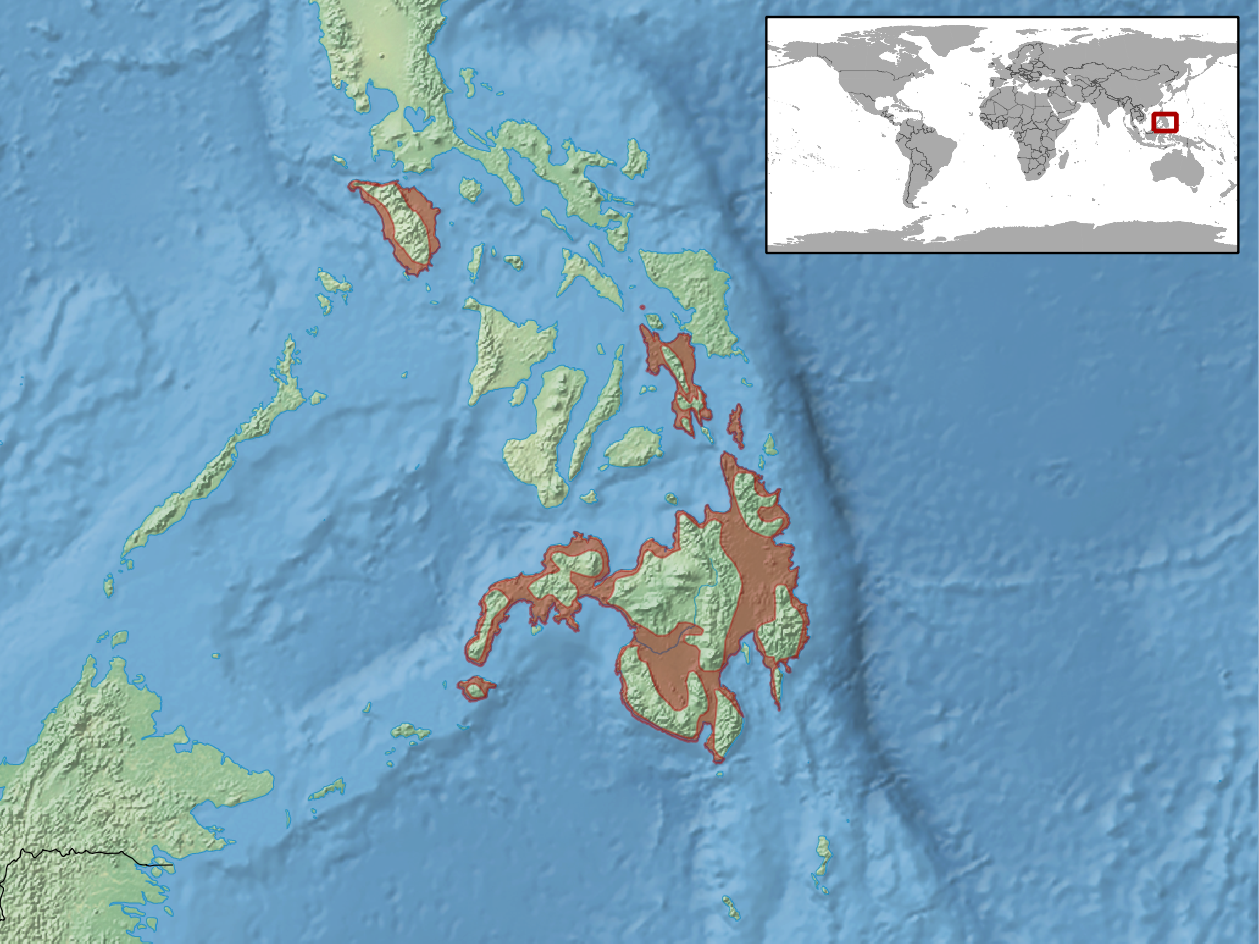

Synonyms
- Ptychozoon intermedia Taylor, 1915; Ptychozoon intermedium

Species of lizard

Gekko intermedium, also known as the intermediate flying gecko or Philippine flying gecko, is a species of gecko. It is endemic to the Philippines.
