= Canh's gecko =

Conservation status
- Least Concern (IUCN 3.1)

Scientific classification
- Kingdom: Animalia
- Phylum: Chordata
- Class: Reptilia
- Order: Squamata
- Suborder: Gekkota
- Family: Gekkonidae
- Genus: Gekko
- Species: G. canhi

Binomial name
- Gekko canhi Rösler, T.Q. Nguyen, K.V. Doan, Ho, T.T. Nguyen & Ziegler, 2010

Synonyms
- Gekko canhi Rösler et al., 2010; Gekko canhi — Luu et al., 2014; Gekko (Japonigekko) canhi — Wood et al., 2019

Species of lizard

Canh's gecko (Gekko canhi) is a species of lizard in the family Gekkonidae. The species is endemic to Vietnam.

== Etymology ==
The specific name, canhi, is in honor of Vietnamese ecologist Le Xuan Canh.

== Geographic range ==
G. canhi is found in Lang Son Province and Lao Cai Province, in northern Vietnam.

== Habitat ==
The preferred natural habitat of G. canhi is forest, at altitudes of 200–1,500 m (660–4,920 ft).

== Description ==
Medium-sized for its genus, the snout-to-vent length of an adult G. canhi does not exceed 10 cm (3.9 in).

== Reproduction ==
G. canhi is oviparous.
