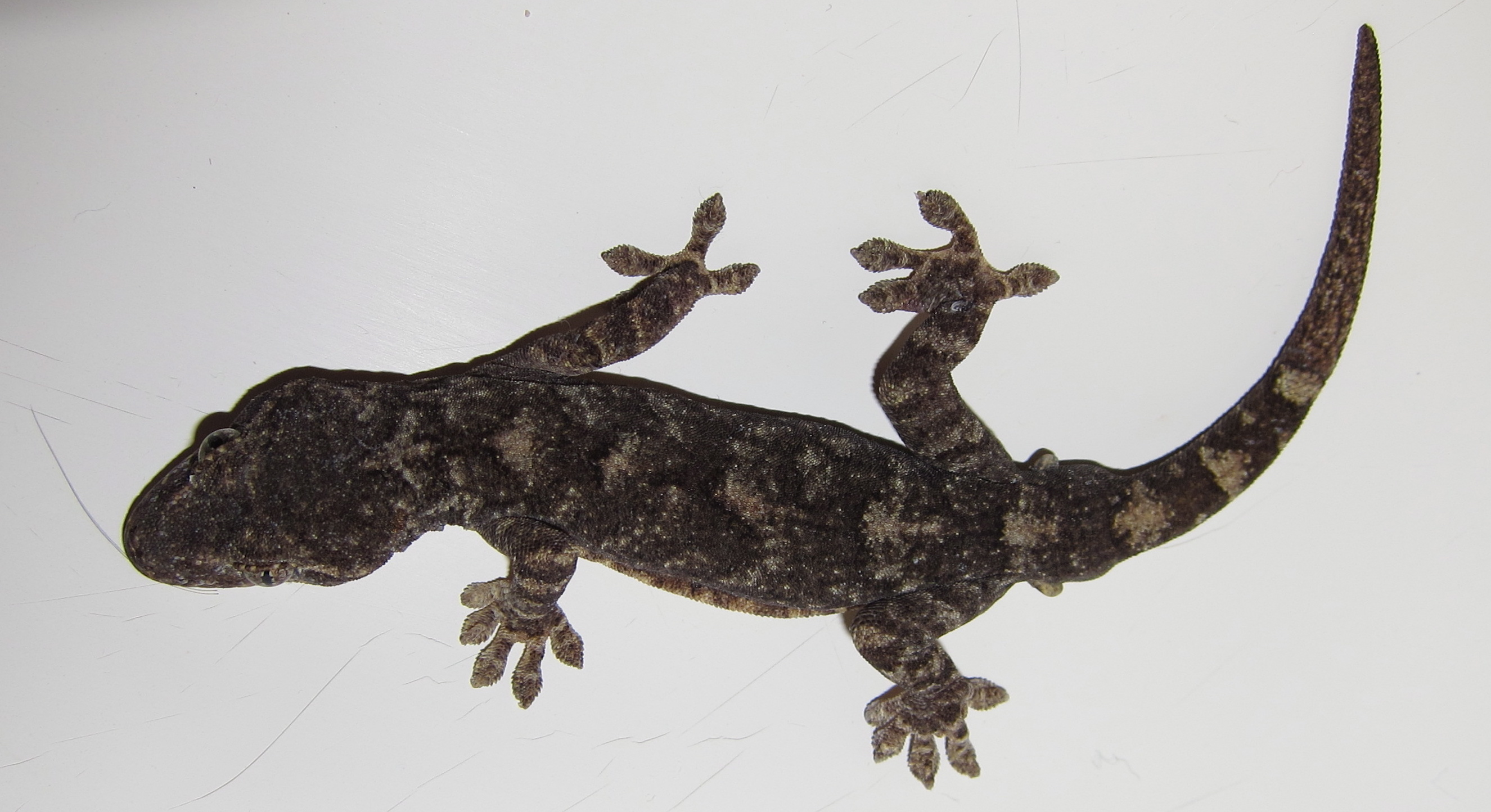

Conservation status
- Least Concern (IUCN 3.1)

Scientific classification
- Kingdom: Animalia
- Phylum: Chordata
- Class: Reptilia
- Order: Squamata
- Suborder: Gekkota
- Family: Gekkonidae
- Genus: Gekko
- Species: G. tawaensis

Binomial name
- Gekko tawaensis Okada, 1956
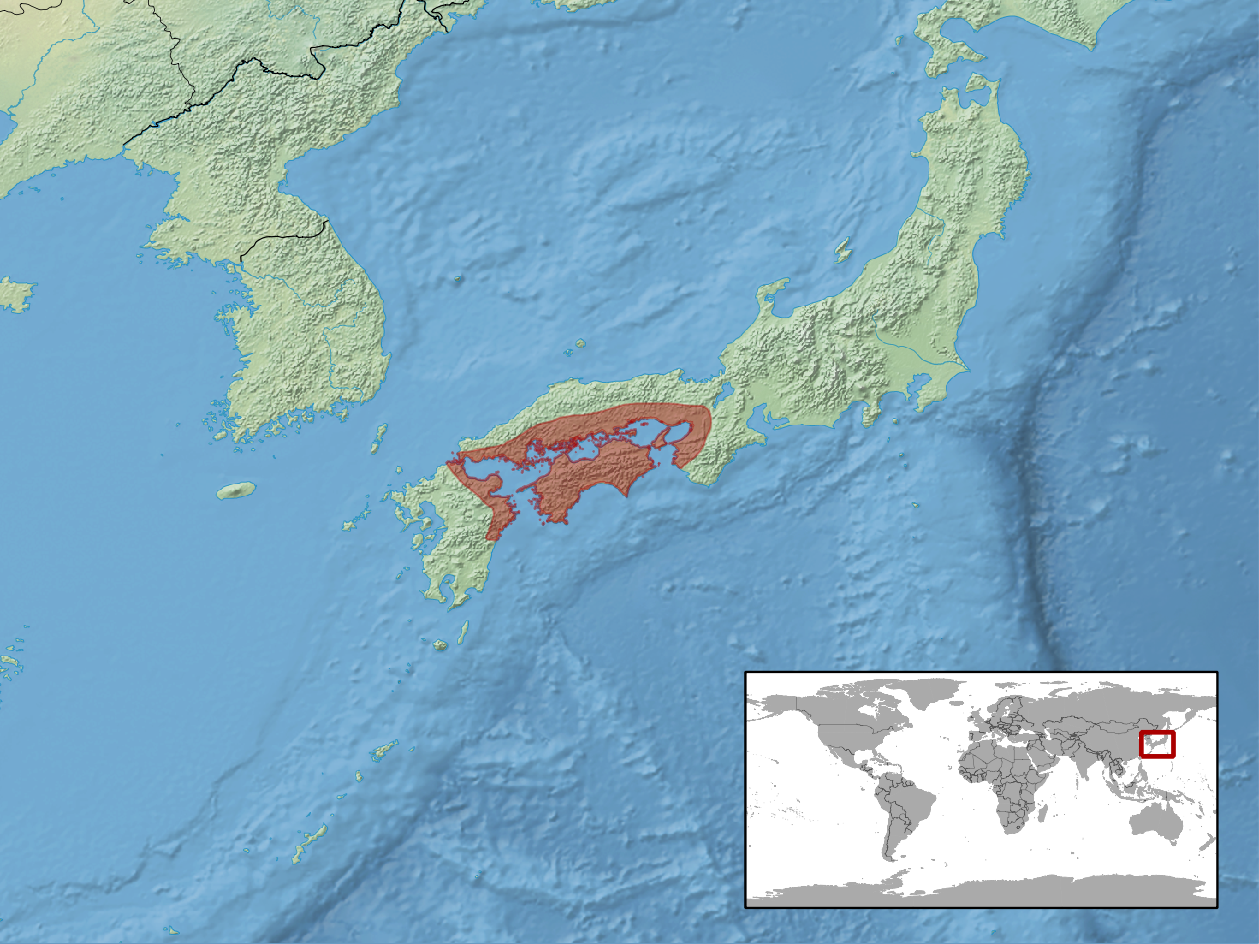

= Tawa gecko =

Species of lizard

The Tawa gecko (Gekko tawaensis) is a species of gecko. It is endemic to Japan.
