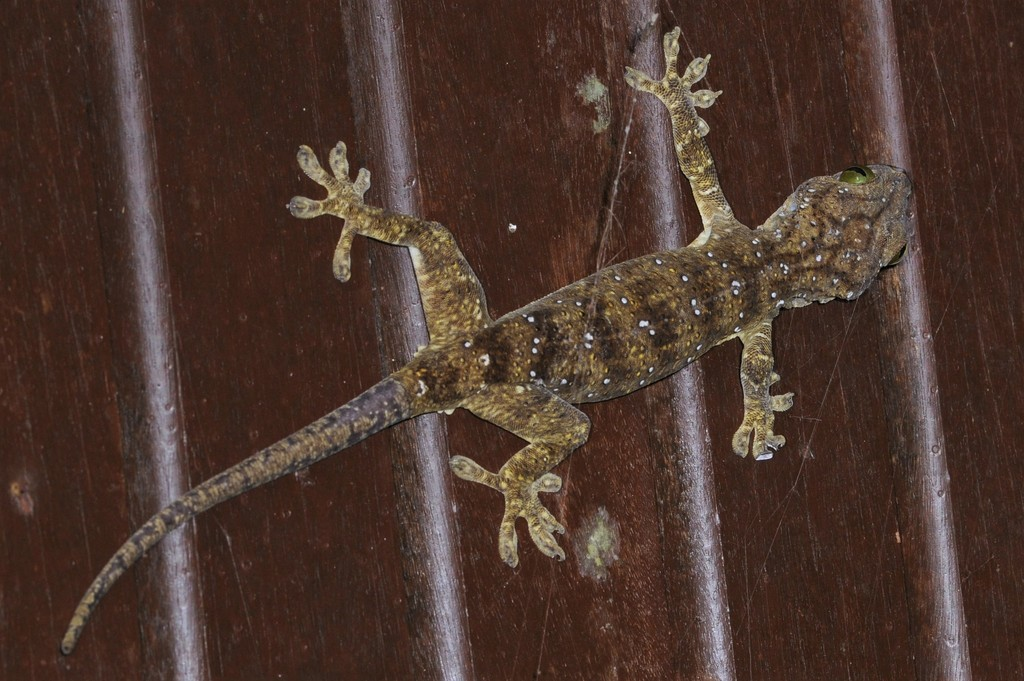

Scientific classification
- Kingdom: Animalia
- Phylum: Chordata
- Class: Reptilia
- Order: Squamata
- Suborder: Gekkota
- Family: Gekkonidae
- Genus: Gekko
- Species: G. albofasciolatus

Binomial name
- Gekko albofasciolatus (Günther, 1867)

Synonyms
- Gecko albo-fasciolatus Günther, 1867

= Gekko albofasciolatus =

Species of lizard

Gekko albofasciolatus is a species of gecko. It is endemic to the Indo-Australian archipelago. It is sometimes considered conspecific with Gekko smithii.
