= Gekko phuyenensis =

Scientific classification
- Kingdom: Animalia
- Phylum: Chordata
- Class: Reptilia
- Order: Squamata
- Suborder: Gekkota
- Family: Gekkonidae
- Genus: Gekko
- Species: G. phuyenensis

Binomial name
- Gekko phuyenensis Nguyen, Nguyen, Orlov, Murphy, & Nguyen, 2021

Species of lizard

Gekko phuyenensis is a species of gecko. It is found in Phú Yên Province, Vietnam.
