= Gekko palawanensis =

Conservation status
- Near Threatened (IUCN 3.1)

Scientific classification
- Kingdom: Animalia
- Phylum: Chordata
- Class: Reptilia
- Order: Squamata
- Suborder: Gekkota
- Family: Gekkonidae
- Genus: Gekko
- Species: G. palawanensis

Binomial name
- Gekko palawanensis Taylor, 1925
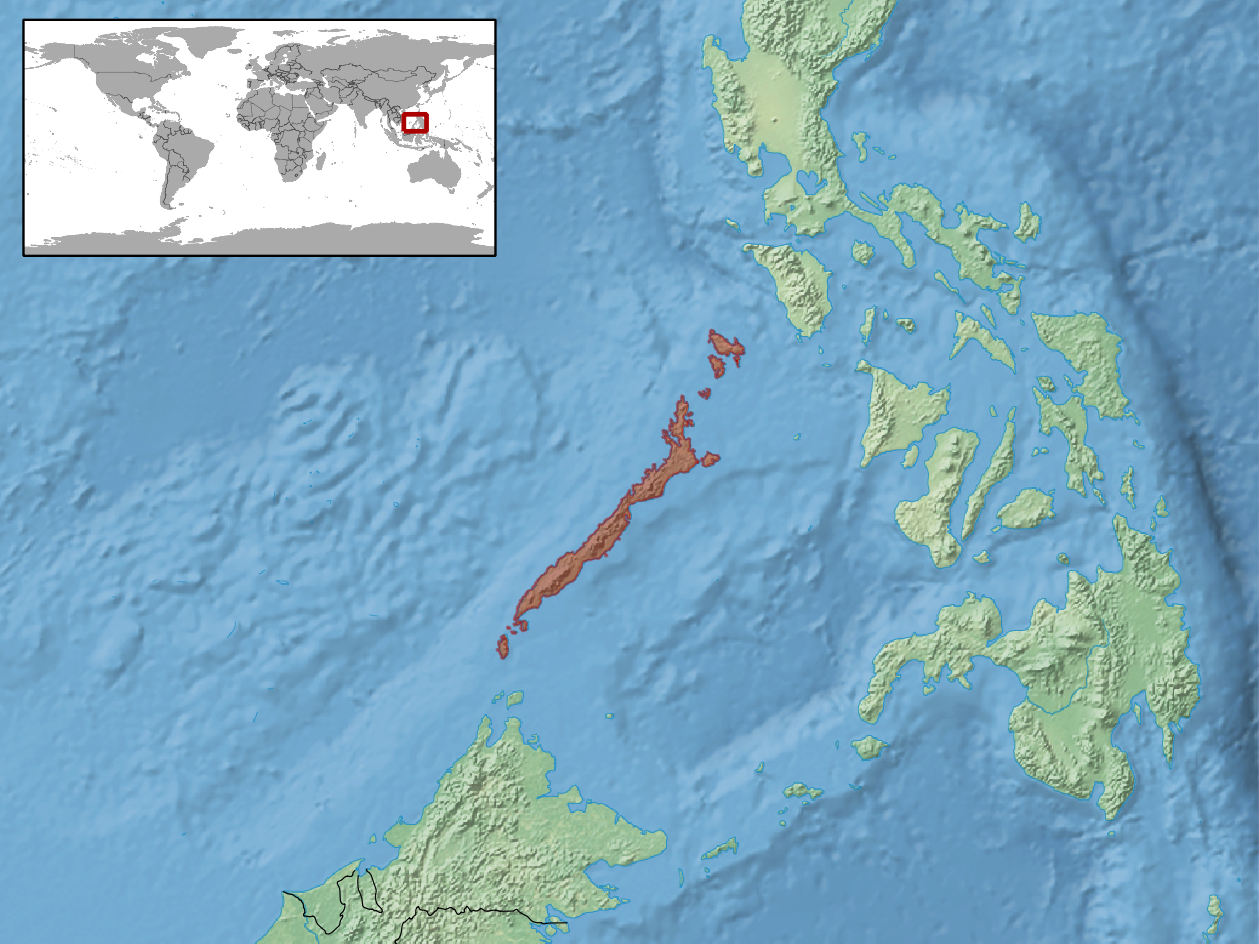

Species of lizard

Gekko palawanensis, also known as the Palawan gecko or the Palawan narrow-disked gecko, is a species of gecko. It is endemic to Palawan in the Philippines.
