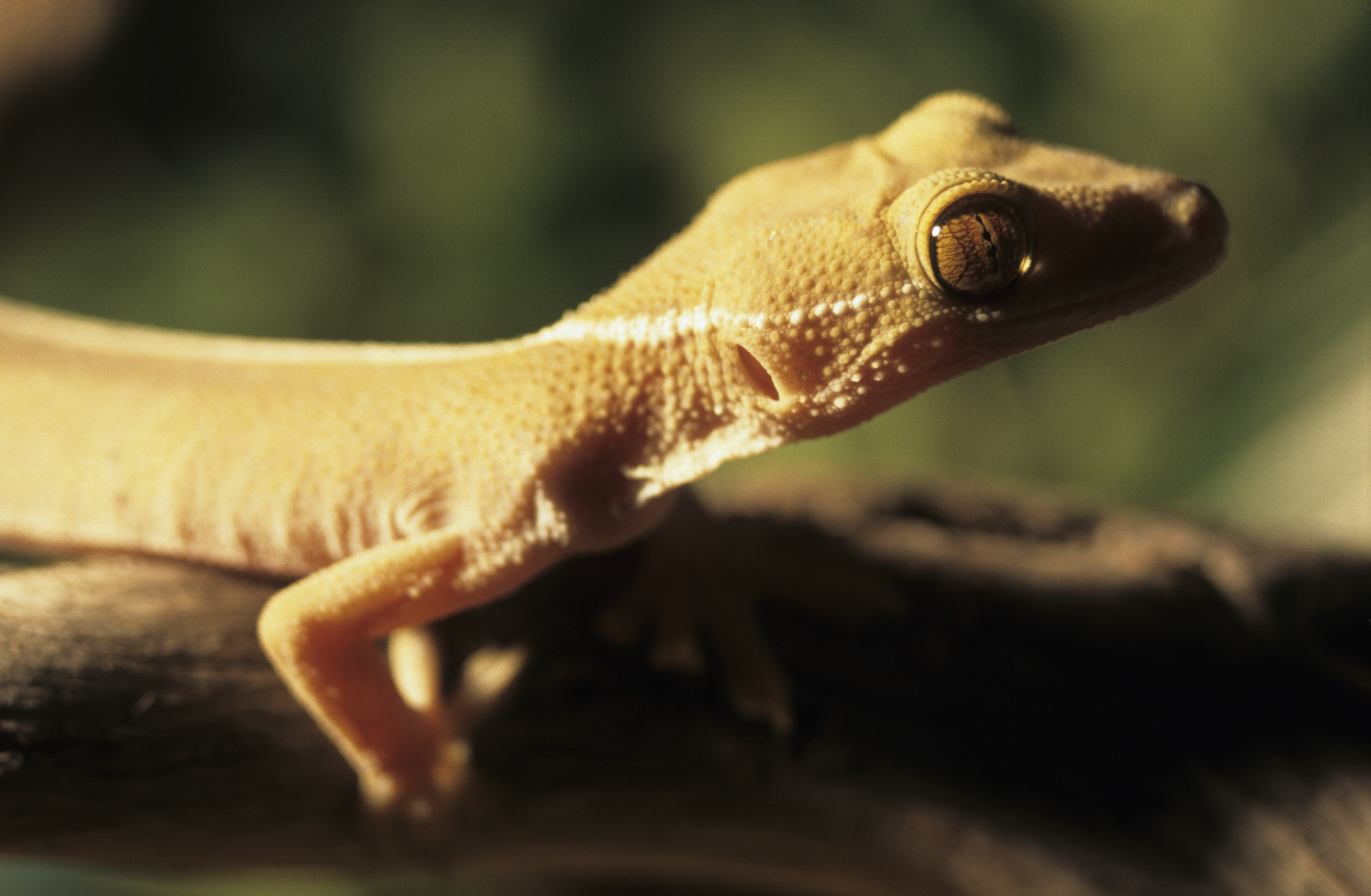

Scientific classification
- Kingdom: Animalia
- Phylum: Chordata
- Class: Reptilia
- Order: Squamata
- Suborder: Gekkota
- Family: Gekkonidae
- Genus: Gekko
- Species: G. vittatus

Binomial name
- Gekko vittatus Houttuyn, 1782

= Lined gecko =

Species of lizard

The lined gecko (Gekko vittatus), also known as the skunk gecko due to the notable stripe down its back, is a species of gecko.

It can be found in Indonesia, New Guinea, Palau, and the Solomon Islands.

White lined geckos usually live between 3-5 years in the wild; however, in captivity with proper care their lifespans drastically increase, including those wild caught. In captivity, they can live twice their wild lifespan at the minimum, with some individuals living 15-20 years with proper care.

== Diet ==
Lined geckos are insectivores, feeding primarily on invertebrates. In captivity, they are fed crickets, roaches, and mealworms.

== Behavior ==
Lined geckos are a nocturnal species, active at night. They hide and sleep during the day. This is an arboreal species of gecko, with "sticky" toe pads that allow them to climb a variety of surfaces. When startled, these geckos may vocalize or even try to bite. They are skittish and secretive, taking cover when threats approach them.

== Reproduction ==
Lined geckos breed in the spring and lay clutches of two eggs every month or so, totaling an average of 6-12 eggs. Eggs incubate for 80-120 days and females will guard their eggs, and babies, from threats. Once the babies are nearly adult size, they venture away from the mom to pursue their own lives.

== As pets ==
In 2025, lined geckos saw a surge in popularity in the pet trade. Most adults are caught in the wild and imported, however there are captive breeding efforts underway. These arboreal geckos tend to not enjoy handling. They need a taller enclosure to suit their climbing habits and plenty of places to hide.
