= Gekko rhacophorus =

Conservation status
- Data Deficient (IUCN 3.1)

Scientific classification
- Kingdom: Animalia
- Phylum: Chordata
- Class: Reptilia
- Order: Squamata
- Suborder: Gekkota
- Family: Gekkonidae
- Genus: Gekko
- Species: G. rhacophorus

Binomial name
- Gekko rhacophorus (Boulenger, 1899)

Synonyms
- Gecko rhacophorus; Ptychozoon rhacophorus

Species of lizard

The Sabah flying gecko (Gekko rhacophorus) is a species of gecko. It is endemic to Sabah.
