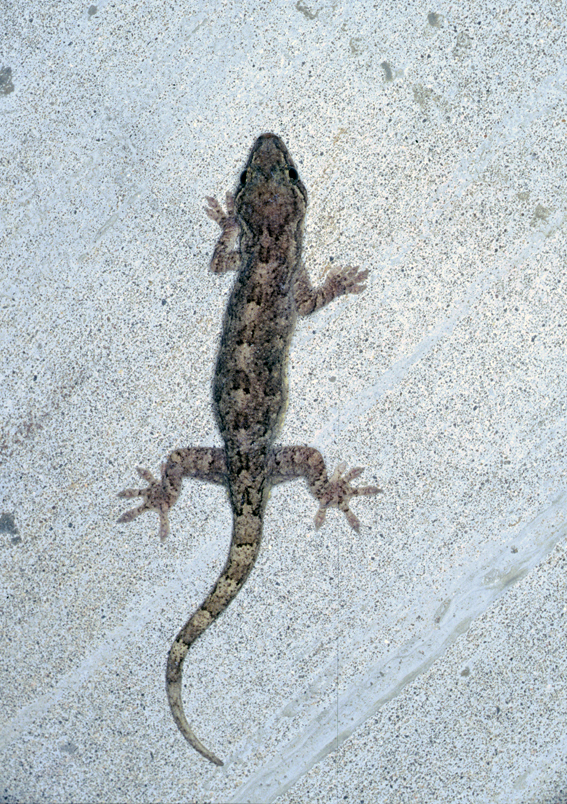

Conservation status
- Data Deficient (IUCN 3.1)

Scientific classification
- Kingdom: Animalia
- Phylum: Chordata
- Class: Reptilia
- Order: Squamata
- Suborder: Gekkota
- Family: Gekkonidae
- Genus: Gekko
- Species: G. guishanicus

Binomial name
- Gekko guishanicus Lin & Yao, 2016

= Gekko guishanicus =

Species of lizard

Gekko guishanicus is a species of Genus Gekko, Family Gekkonidae. It is endemic to Guishan Island (Yilan). Discovered on Guishan Island in Toucheng Town, Yilan County, northeast of Taiwan, this species of gecko was previously mistaken for Gekko hokouensis.

The discovery of this species was based on morphological and molecular evidence reports. Using the molecular relationship analysis of mtDNA CTB sequences, the maximum probability method was used to construct the similar gecko species in Taiwan and adjacent areas. Apparently, it is an independent group, so the gecko found on Guishan Island is identified as a new species of the genus Gekko.

== Species characteristics ==
Appearance: It is a small-sized gecko with a flat and narrow body, with a total length of about 12.5 cm and a snout-vent length (SVL) of about 6 cm. The background color of the body and back is brown, with dark brown transverse spots on it. There are 6 dark color narrow transverse spots in the center of the back of the body from the neck to the anus. And there are more than 6 dark color transverse spots on the tail extending along the entire tail.

Characteristic details: It has a pair of elongated posterior chin scales, with 3-4 submental scales on each side, and 2-3 larynx scales behind the elongated posterior chin scales. It has 8-10 petals without claws on its inner finger, and it has the same wart scales on the back of the body and limbs, without extra large ones.

Reproduction: As an oviparous animal, it lays two connected eggs each time. Males have 6-8 precloacal pores arranged in a row.

== Distribution and habits ==
So far, it has been found only on Guishan Island in the northeast of Taiwan. Normally, it is found on the walls of artificial buildings on flat ground, such as walls or brickwork joints of brick houses, warehouses, and cement water storage towers. As a nocturnal animal, it becomes active only after sunset.
