= Thakhek gecko =

Sengchanthavong’s gecko

Conservation status
- Vulnerable (IUCN 3.1)

Scientific classification
- Kingdom: Animalia
- Phylum: Chordata
- Class: Reptilia
- Order: Squamata
- Suborder: Gekkota
- Family: Gekkonidae
- Genus: Gekko
- Species: G. thakhekensis

Binomial name
- Gekko thakhekensis Luu, Calame, Nguyen, Le, Bonkowski, & Ziegler, 2014

Species of lizard

The Thakhek gecko (Gekko thakhekensis) is a species of gecko. It is endemic to Laos.
