= Gekko bannaense =

Conservation status
- Data Deficient (IUCN 3.1)

Scientific classification
- Kingdom: Animalia
- Phylum: Chordata
- Class: Reptilia
- Order: Squamata
- Suborder: Gekkota
- Family: Gekkonidae
- Genus: Gekko
- Species: G. bannaense

Binomial name
- Gekko bannaense Wang, Wang, & Liu, 2016

Synonyms
- Ptychozoon bannaense

Species of lizard

Gekko bannaense, the Banna parachute gecko, is a species of gecko. It is endemic to China.
