= Shanxi gecko =

Conservation status
- Data Deficient (IUCN 3.1)

Scientific classification
- Kingdom: Animalia
- Phylum: Chordata
- Class: Reptilia
- Order: Squamata
- Suborder: Gekkota
- Family: Gekkonidae
- Genus: Gekko
- Species: G. auriverrucosus

Binomial name
- Gekko auriverrucosus Zhou & Liu, 1982
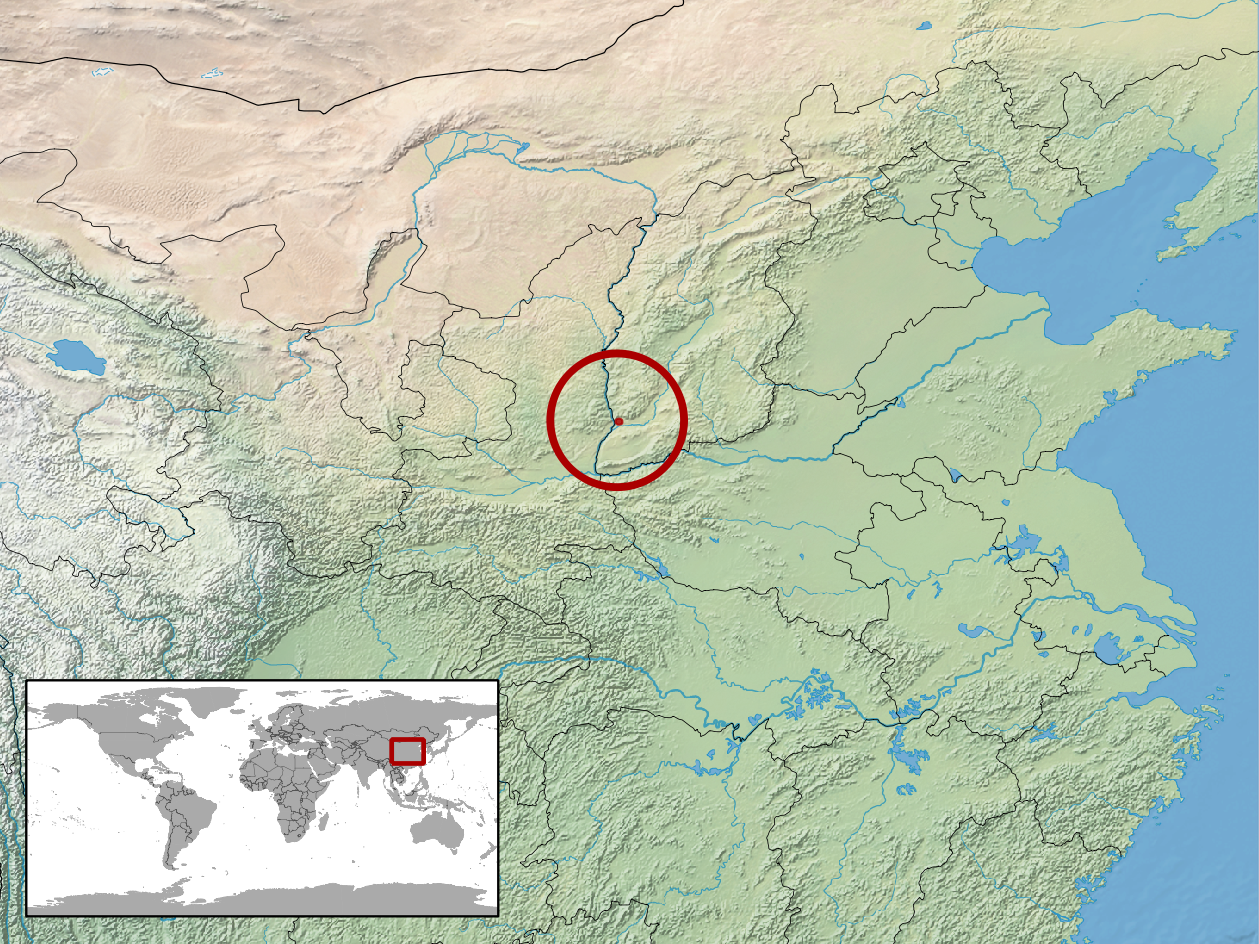

Species of lizard

The Shanxi gecko (Gekko auriverrucosus) is a species of gecko. It is endemic to Shanxi Province in China.
