= Ta Kou marbled gecko =

Conservation status
- Vulnerable (IUCN 3.1)

Scientific classification
- Kingdom: Animalia
- Phylum: Chordata
- Class: Reptilia
- Order: Squamata
- Suborder: Gekkota
- Family: Gekkonidae
- Genus: Gekko
- Species: G. takouensis

Binomial name
- Gekko takouensis Ngo & Gamble, 2010

Species of lizard

The Ta Kou marbled gecko (Gekko takouensis) is a species of gecko. It is endemic to southern Vietnam.
