= Gekko porosus =

Conservation status
- Least Concern (IUCN 3.1)

Scientific classification
- Kingdom: Animalia
- Phylum: Chordata
- Class: Reptilia
- Order: Squamata
- Suborder: Gekkota
- Family: Gekkonidae
- Genus: Gekko
- Species: G. porosus

Binomial name
- Gekko porosus Taylor, 1922
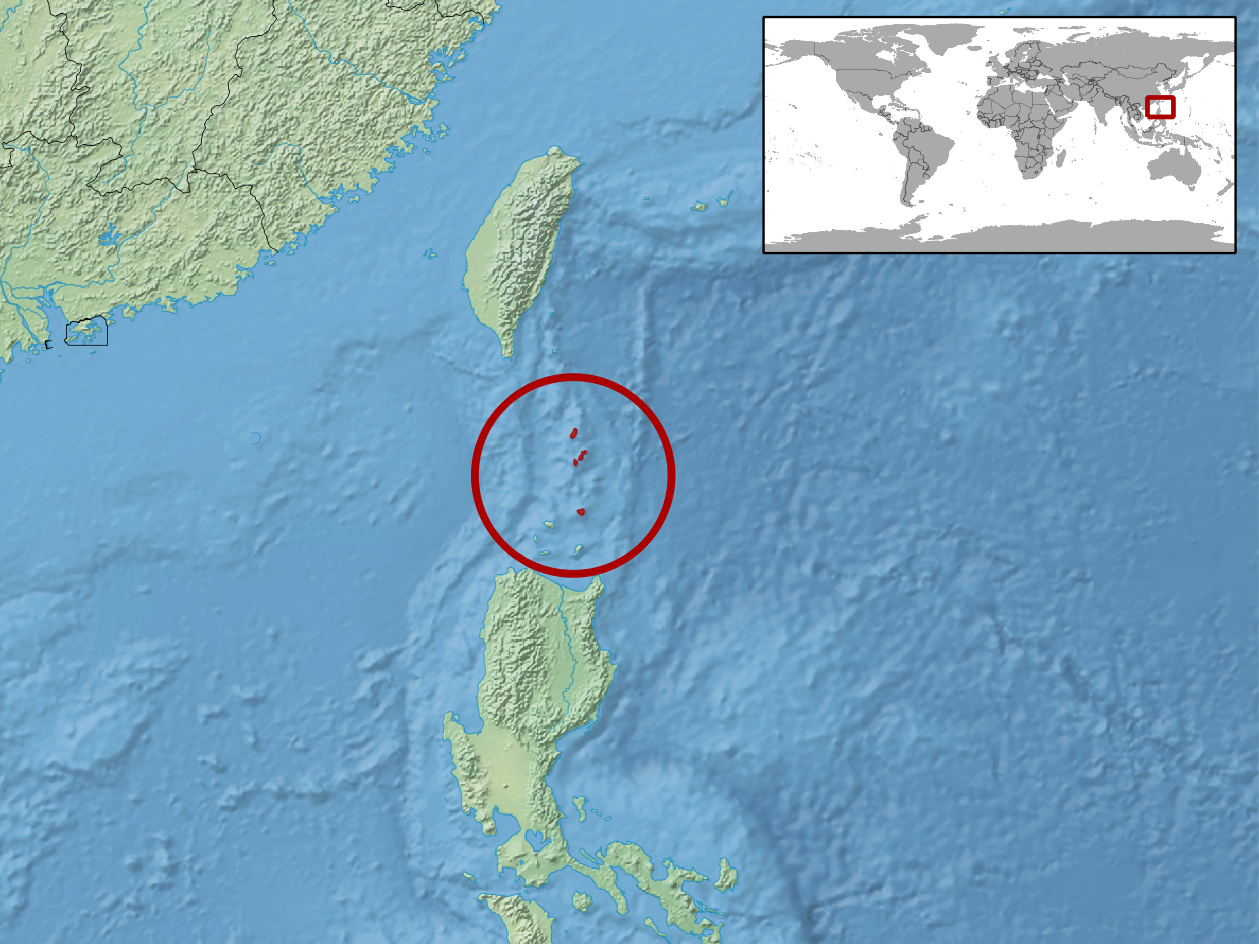

Species of reptile

Gekko porosus, also known as Taylor's gecko or the Batan narrow-disked gecko, is a species of gecko. It is found in the northern Philippines.
