= Gekko boehmei =

Conservation status
- Vulnerable (IUCN 3.1)

Scientific classification
- Kingdom: Animalia
- Phylum: Chordata
- Class: Reptilia
- Order: Squamata
- Suborder: Gekkota
- Family: Gekkonidae
- Genus: Gekko
- Species: G. boehmei

Binomial name
- Gekko boehmei Luu, Calame, Nguyen, Le & Ziegler, 2015

Synonyms
- Gekko boehmei Luu et al., 2015; Gekko (Sundagekko) boehmei — Wood et al., 2019; Gekko (Lomatodactylus) boehmei — Wood et al., 2020

Species of lizard

Gekko boehmei, also known commonly as Boehme's gecko or Böhme's gecko, and as kap ke Boehme in Laotian, is a species of lizard in the family Gekkonidae. The species is endemic to Laos.

== Etymology ==
The specific name, boehmei, is in honor of German herpetologist Wolfgang Böhme.

== Geographic range ==
G. boehmei is found in central Laos, in Khammouane Province.

== Habitat ==
The preferred natural habitats of G. boehmei are forest and rocky areas, at an altitude of about 200 m (660 ft).

== Description ==
G. boehmei is medium-sized for its genus. Maximum recorded snout-to-vent length (SVL) is 10.5 cm (4.1 in).

== Reproduction ==
G. boehmei is oviparous.
