= Gekko cib =

Scientific classification
- Kingdom: Animalia
- Phylum: Chordata
- Class: Reptilia
- Order: Squamata
- Suborder: Gekkota
- Family: Gekkonidae
- Genus: Gekko
- Species: G. cib

Binomial name
- Gekko cib Lyu, Lin, Ren, Jiang, Zhang, Qi & Wang, 2021

Species of lizard

Gekko cib, also known commonly as the CIB gecko, is a species of lizard in the family Gekkonidae. The species is endemic to China.

== Etymology ==
The specific name, cib, refers to the Chengdu Institute of Biology (CIB), where the holotype was collected from a wall surface.

== Geographic range ==
G. cib is found in Southwestern China, in the provinces of Sichuan and Yunnan.
