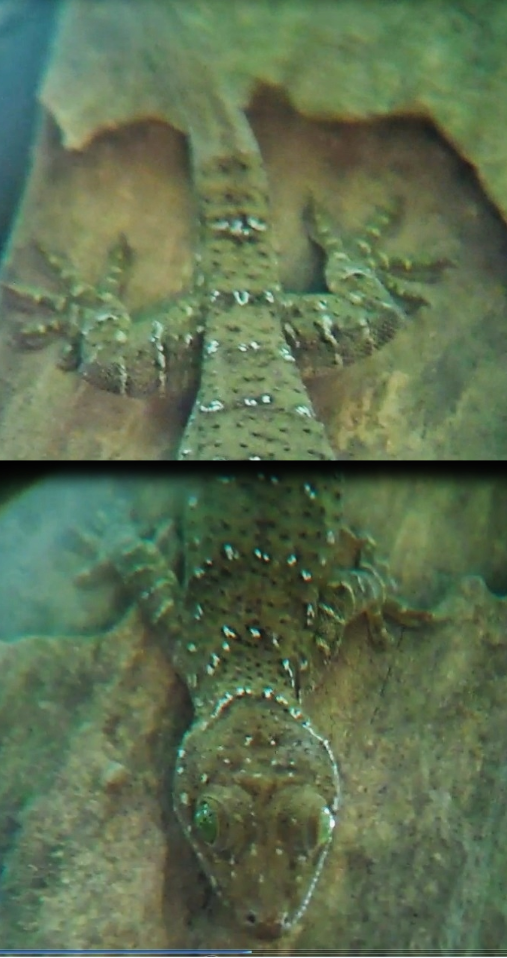

Scientific classification
- Kingdom: Animalia
- Phylum: Chordata
- Class: Reptilia
- Order: Squamata
- Suborder: Gekkota
- Family: Gekkonidae
- Genus: Gekko
- Species: G. albomaculatus

Binomial name
- Gekko albomaculatus Giebel, 1861

= Gekko albomaculatus =

Species of lizard

Gekko albomaculatus, commonly known as Smith's gecko or large forest gecko, is a species of gecko. It is found in Thailand and Malaysia.
