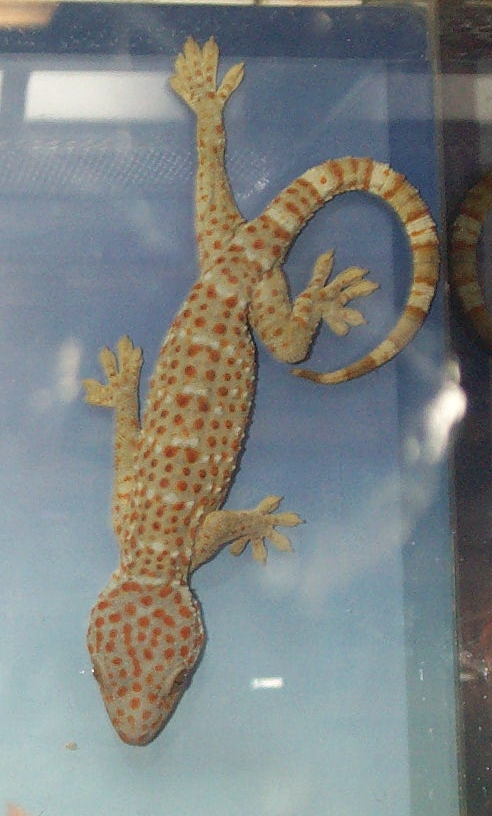
- Tokay gecko (Gekko gecko), the most widespread species of the genus

Scientific classification
- Kingdom: Animalia
- Phylum: Chordata
- Class: Reptilia
- Order: Squamata
- Suborder: Gekkota
- Family: Gekkonidae
- Subfamily: Gekkoninae
- Genus: Gekko; Laurenti, 1768

Type species
- Gekko gecko Linnaeus, 1758

Species
- 88, see text.

= Gekko =

Gekko Temporal range: Miocene to Recent

Genus of lizards

Gekko is a genus of Southeast Asian geckos, commonly known as true geckos or calling geckos, in the family Gekkonidae. Although species such as Gekko gecko (tokay gecko) are very widespread and common, some species in the same genus have a very small range and are considered rare or endangered.

The flying geckos, once in their own genus Ptychozoon, are now included in Gekko.

Tokay gecko calls
Calls of the Tokay gecko (Gekko gecko)

== Species ==
The following species are recognized as being valid.

- Gekko aaronbaueri Tri, Thai, Phimvohan, David & Teynié, 2015 – Aaron Bauer's gecko
- Gekko adleri T.Q. Nguyen, Y. Wang, Yang, Lehmann, Ziegler & Bonkowski, 2013 – Adler's gecko
- Gekko albofasciolatus (A. Günther, 1867)
- Gekko albomaculatus Giebel, 1861 – Smith's gecko, large forest gecko
- Gekko alpinus Ma, Shi, Shen, Chang & Jiang, 2024
- Gekko asahi Matsukoji et al., 2026 – West Japanese Gecko
- Gekko athymus W.C. Brown & Alcala, 1962 – Brown's gecko
- Gekko auriverrucosus Zhou & Y. Liu, 1982 – Shanxi gecko
- Gekko badenii Szczerbak & Nekrasova, 1994 – golden gecko
- Gekko bannaense Y. Wang, J. Wang & Z. Liu, 2016 – Banna parachute gecko
- Gekko boehmei Luu, Calame, T.Q. Nguyen, Le & Ziegler, 2015 – Böhme's gecko
- Gekko bonkowskii Luu, Calame, T.Q. Nguyen, Le & Ziegler, 2015 – Bonkowski's gecko
- Gekko browni Russell, 1979 – Brown's gecko, Brown's wolf gecko, Brown's fringe gecko
- Gekko canaensis Ngo & Gamble, 2011 – Cà Ná marbled gecko
- Gekko canhi Rösler, T.Q. Nguyen, Doan, Ho, T.T. Nguyen & Zeigler, 2010 – Canh's gecko
- Gekko carusadensis Linkem, Siler, Diesmos, Sy & R.M. Brown, 2010 – Luzon karst gecko
- Gekko chinensis (Gray, 1842) – Gray's Chinese gecko
- Gekko cib Lyu, Lin, Ren, K. Jiang, Zhang, S. Qi & J. Wang, 2021
- Gekko cicakterbang L. Grismer, Wood, J. Grismer, Quah, Thy, Phimmachak, Sivongxay, Seateun, B. Stuart, Siler, Mulcahy, Anamza & R.M. Brown, 2019 – Malaysia parachute gecko
- Gekko coi R.M. Brown, Siler, Oliveros, Diesmos & Alcala, 2011
- Gekko crombota R.M. Brown, Oliveros, Siler & Diesmos, 2008 – Babuyan Claro gecko
- Gekko ernstkelleri Rösler, Siler, R.M. Brown, Demegillo & Gaulke, 2006
- Gekko flavimaritus Rujirawan, Fong, Ampai, Yodthong, Termprayoon & Aowphol, 2019
- Gekko gecko (Linnaeus, 1758) – tokay gecko
  - Gekko gecko azhari Mertens, 1955
  - Gekko gecko gecko (Linnaeus, 1758)
- Gekko gigante W.C. Brown & Alcala, 1978 – Gigante gecko
- Gekko grossmanni R. Günther, 1994 – Grossmann's gecko
- Gekko guishanicus Lin & Yao, 2016
- Gekko gulat R.M. Brown, Diesmos, Duya, Garcia & Rico, 2010
- Gekko hokouensis Pope, 1928 – Kwangsi gecko
- Gekko horsfieldii (Gray, 1827) – Horsfield's flying gecko, Horsfield's parachute gecko
- Gekko hulk L. Grismer, Pinto, Quah, Anuar, Cota, McGuire, Iskandar, Wood & J. Grismer, 2022
- Gekko intermedium Taylor, 1915 – intermediate flying gecko
- Gekko iskandari R.M. Brown, Supriatna & Ota, 2000 – Pak Djoko's flap-legged gecko
- Gekko japonicus (Schlegel, 1836) – Schlegel's Japanese gecko
- Gekko jinjiangensis Hou, Shi, G. Wang, Shu, Zheng, Y. Qi, Liu, J. Jiang & Xie, 2021
- Gekko kabkaebin L. Grismer, Wood, J. Grismer, Quah, Thy, Phimmachak, Sivongxay, Seateun, B. Stuart, Siler, Mulcahy, Anamza & R.M. Brown, 2019 – Lao parachute gecko
- Gekko kaengkrachanense Sumontha, Pauwels, Kunya, Limlikhitaksorn, Ruksue, Taokratok, Ansermet & Chanhome, 2012 – Kaeng Krachan parachute gecko
- Gekko khunkhamensis Sitthivong, Lo, T.Q. Nguyen, H.T. Ngo, Khotpathoom, Le, Ziegler & Luu, 2021
- Gekko kikuchii (Ōshima, 1912) – Botel gecko
- Gekko kuhli (Stejneger, 1902) – Kuhl's flying gecko, Kuhl’s parachute gecko
- Gekko kwangsiensis Yang, 2015 – Kwangsi gecko
- Gekko lauhachindai Panitvong, Sumontha, Konlek & Kunya, 2010 – Lauhachinda's cave gecko
- Gekko liboensis Zhou, Y. Liu & Li, 1982 – Libo's gecko
- Gekko lionotum Annandale, 1905 – smooth-backed gliding gecko, Burmese flying gecko, Burmese parachute gecko
- Gekko melli (T. Vogt, 1922) – Mell's gecko
- Gekko mindorensis Taylor, 1919 – Mindoro narrow-disked gecko
- Gekko mizoramensis Lalremsanga, Muansanga, Vabeiryureilai & Mirza, 2023
- Gekko monarchus (Schlegel, 1836) – spotted house gecko
- Gekko nadenensis Luu, T.Q. Nguyen, Le, Bonkowski & Ziegler, 2017 – Naden gecko
- Gekko nicobarensis Das & Vijayakumar, 2009 – Nicobar gliding gecko
- Gekko nutaphandi Bauer, Sumontha & Pauwels, 2008
- Gekko palawanensis Taylor, 1925 – Palawan gecko
- Gekko palmatus Boulenger, 1907 – palm gecko
- Gekko petricolus Taylor, 1962 – sandstone gecko
- Gekko phuyenensis V.D.H. Nguyen, L.T. Nguyen, Orlov, Murphy & S.N. Nguyen, 2021
- Gekko popaense L. Grismer, Wood, Thura, M. Grismer, R.M. Brown & B. Stuart, 2018 – Mt. Popa parachute gecko
- Gekko porosus Taylor, 1922 – Taylor's gecko
- Gekko pradapdao Meesook, Sumontha, Donbundit & Pauwels, 2021
- Gekko reevesii (Gray, 1831) – Reeves's tokay gecko
- Gekko remotus Rösler, Ineich, Wilms & Böhme, 2012
- Gekko rhacophorus (Boulenger, 1899) – Sabah flying gecko
- Gekko romblon W.C. Brown & Alcala, 1978 – Philippine gecko
- Gekko rossi R.M. Brown, Oliveros, Siler & Diesmos, 2009 – Ross's Calayan gecko
- Gekko russelltraini Ngo, Bauer, Wood & J. Grismer, 2009 – Russell Train's marble gecko
- Gekko scabridus Y. Liu & Zhou, 1982 – Yunnan gecko
- Gekko scientiadventura Rösler, Ziegler, Vu, Herrmann & Böhme, 2005
- Gekko sengchanthavongi Luu, Calame, T.Q. Nguyen, Le & Ziegler, 2015 – Sengchanthavong’s gecko
- Gekko shibatai Toda, Sengoku, Hikida & Ota, 2008
- Gekko shiva Pauwels, Meesook, Donbundit, Jindamad, Topai & Sumontha, 2025
- Gekko siamensis Grossman & Ulber, 1990 – Siamese green-eyed gecko
- Gekko similignum M.A. Smith, 1923
- Gekko smithii Gray, 1842 – (Andrew) Smith's green-eyed gecko
- Gekko sorok Das, Lakim & Kandaung, 2008
- Gekko stoliczkai Chandramouli, Gokulakrishnan, Sivaperuman & L. Grismer, 2021
- Gekko subpalmatus (A. Günther, 1864)
- Gekko swinhonis A. Günther, 1864 – Peking gecko
- Gekko taibaiensis Song, 1985 – Mingtao's gecko
- Gekko takouensis Ngo & Gamble, 2010 – Ta Kou marbled gecko
- Gekko tawaensis Okada, 1956 – Tawa gecko
- Gekko thakhekensis Luu, Calame, T.Q. Nguyen, Le, Bonkowski & Ziegler, 2014 – Thakhek gecko
- Gekko tokehos L. Grismer, Wood, J. Grismer, Quah, Thy, Phimmachak, Sivongxay, Seateun, B. Stuart, Siler, Mulcahy, Anamza & R.M. Brown, 2019 – Cambodian parachute gecko
- Gekko trinotaterra R.M. Brown, 1999
- Gekko truongi Phung & Ziegler, 2011 – Truong's gecko
- Gekko verreauxi Tytler, 1865 – Andaman giant gecko
- Gekko vertebralis Toda, Sengoku, Hikida & Ota, 2008
- Gekko vietnamensis S.N. Nguyen, 2010 – Vietnam gecko
- Gekko vittatus Houttuyn, 1782 – lined gecko
- Gekko wenxianensis Zhou & Q. Wang, 2008
- Gekko wuzhengjuni Jia-Yi Yu, Hui-Ling Chen, You-Bang Li, Yu-Hui Li, Ze-Ning Chen, 2026
- Gekko yakuensis T. Matsui & Okada, 1968 – Yakushima gecko

Nota bene: A binomial authority in parentheses indicates that the species was originally described in a genus other than Gekko.
