= Gekko khunkhamensis =

Scientific classification
- Kingdom: Animalia
- Phylum: Chordata
- Class: Reptilia
- Order: Squamata
- Suborder: Gekkota
- Family: Gekkonidae
- Genus: Gekko
- Species: G. khunkhamensis

Binomial name
- Gekko khunkhamensis Sitthivong, Lo, Nguyen, Ngo, Khtpathoom, Le, Ziegler, & Luu, 2021

Species of lizard

Gekko khunkhamensis is a species of gecko. It is found in Laos.
