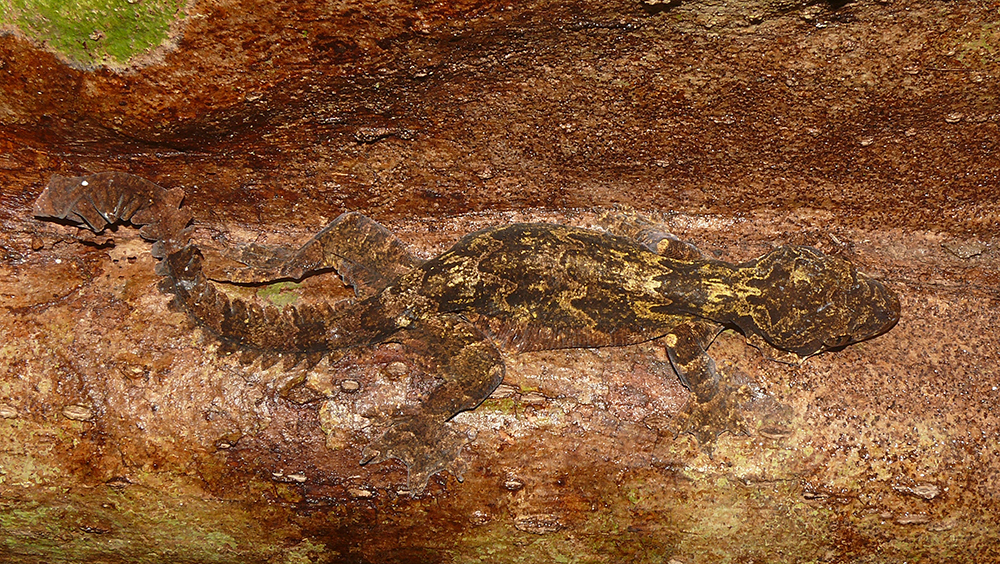

Scientific classification
- Kingdom: Animalia
- Phylum: Chordata
- Class: Reptilia
- Order: Squamata
- Suborder: Gekkota
- Family: Gekkonidae
- Genus: Gekko
- Species: G. nicobarensis

Binomial name
- Gekko nicobarensis Das & Vijayakumar, 2009

Synonyms
- Ptychozoon nicobarensis

= Gekko nicobarensis =

Species of lizard

The Nicobar gliding gecko (Gekko nicobarensis) is a species of gecko. It is endemic to the Nicobar Islands (India).
