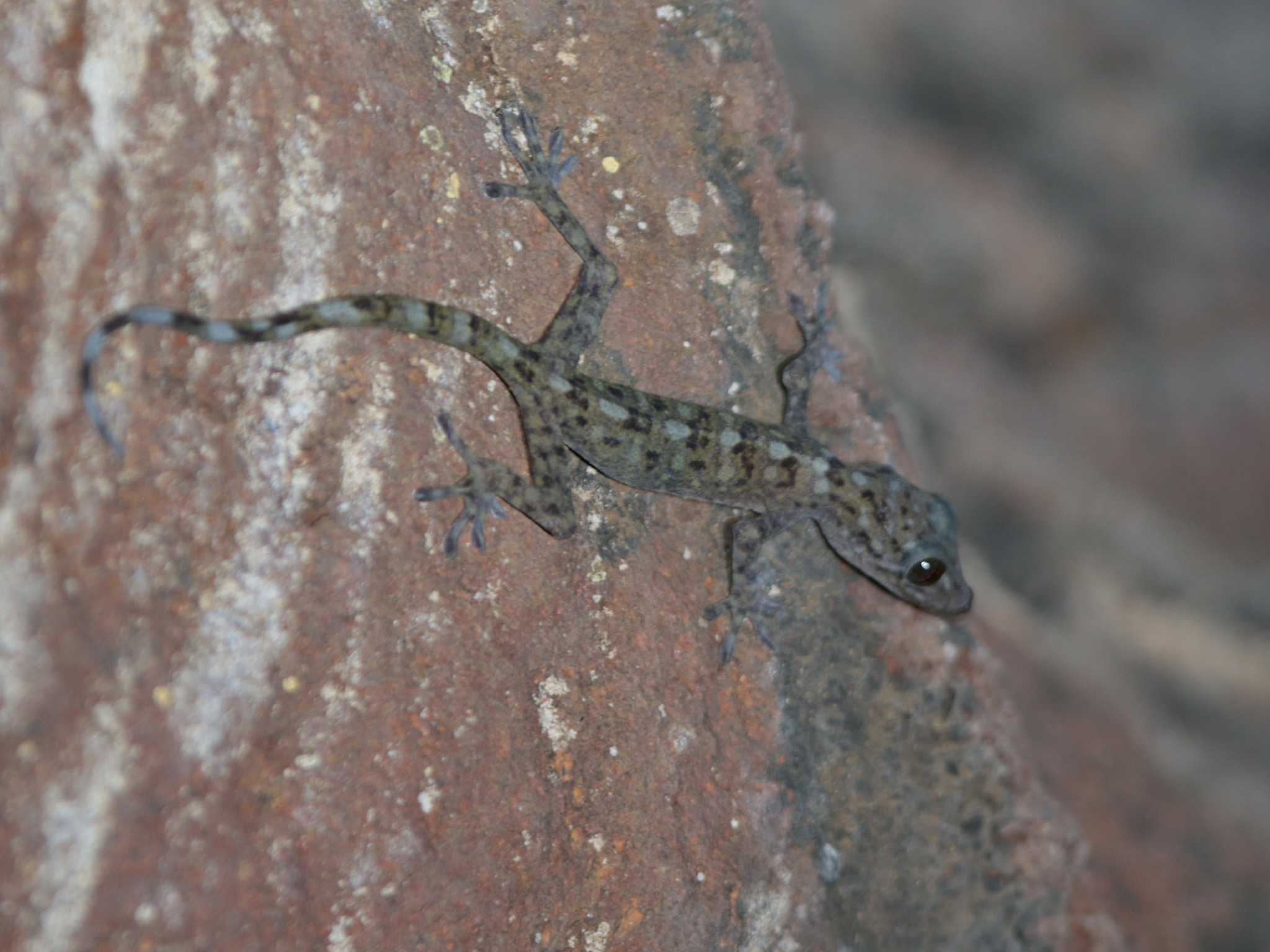

Scientific classification
- Kingdom: Animalia
- Phylum: Chordata
- Class: Reptilia
- Order: Squamata
- Suborder: Gekkota
- Family: Gekkonidae
- Genus: Gekko
- Species: G. flavimaritus

Binomial name
- Gekko flavimaritus Rujirawan, Fong, & Aowphol, 2019

= Gekko flavimaritus =

Species of lizard

Gekko flavimaritus is a species of gecko, a lizard in the family Gekkonidae. The species is endemic to Thailand.
