= Mell's gecko =

Scientific classification
- Kingdom: Animalia
- Phylum: Chordata
- Class: Reptilia
- Order: Squamata
- Suborder: Gekkota
- Family: Gekkonidae
- Genus: Gekko
- Species: G. melli

Binomial name
- Gekko melli (T. Vogt, 1922)

Synonyms
- Gecko [sic] melli T. Vogt, 1922; Gekko [sic] melli — Rösler et al., 2004; Gekko (Japonigecko) melli — Wood et al., 2019

Species of lizard

Mell's gecko (Gekko melli) is a species of lizard in the family Gekkonidae. The species is endemic to China.

== Etymology ==
The specific name, melli, is in honor of a Mr. Mell of the Natural History Museum, Berlin.

== Geographic range ==
G. melli is found in northeastern Guangdong Province and southern Jiangxi Province. Both provinces are in southern China.

== Description ==
Medium-sized for its genus, G. melli has an average snout-to vent length (SVL) of 7.25 cm (2.85 in). Its colour pattern is very variable. Unlike most species of its genus, it lacks dorsal tubercles.

== Reproduction ==
G. melli is oviparous.
