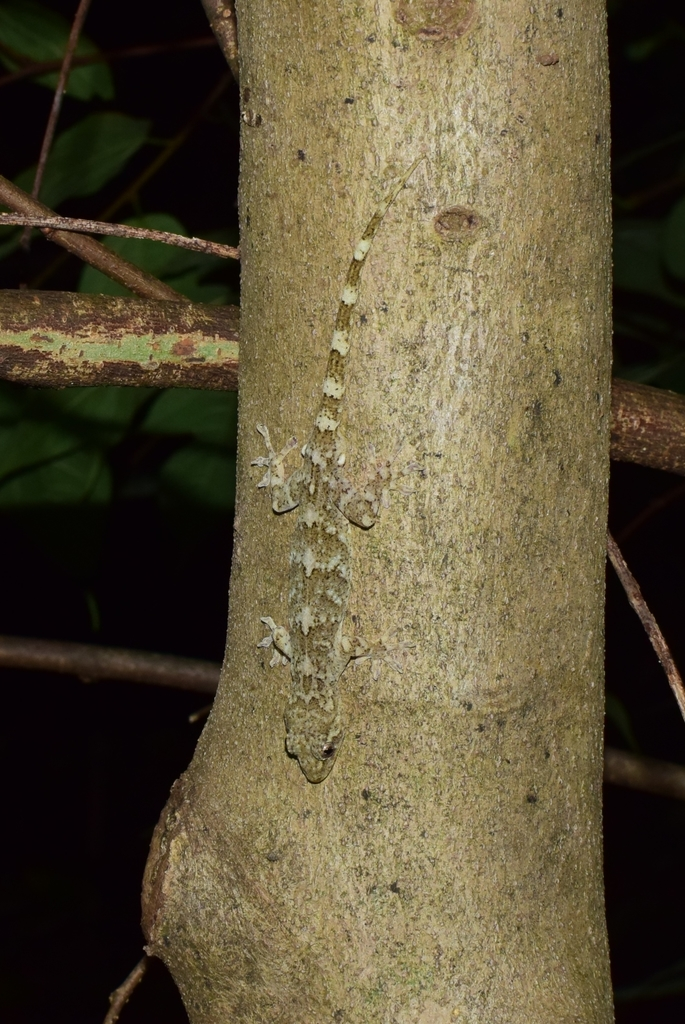

Scientific classification
- Kingdom: Animalia
- Phylum: Chordata
- Class: Reptilia
- Order: Squamata
- Suborder: Gekkota
- Family: Gekkonidae
- Genus: Gekko
- Species: G. subpalmatus

Binomial name
- Gekko subpalmatus (Günther, 1864)

Synonyms
- Gecko subpalmatus

= Gekko subpalmatus =

Species of lizard

Gekko subpalmatus is a species of gecko. It is endemic to China.
