= Cà Ná marbled gecko =

Scientific classification
- Kingdom: Animalia
- Phylum: Chordata
- Class: Reptilia
- Order: Squamata
- Suborder: Gekkota
- Family: Gekkonidae
- Genus: Gekko
- Species: G. canaensis

Binomial name
- Gekko canaensis Ngo and Gamble, 2011

Species of lizard

The Cà Ná marbled gecko (Gekko canaensis) is a species in the Gekko genus, Gekkonidae family, first found from Southern Vietnam in 2011.

== Discovery and naming ==
Field surveys were conducted in May 2006 and June 2010. Species name refers to the location where it was first found—Ca Na cape.

== Physical characteristics ==
SVL to maximum 108.5 mm, dorsal pattern of five to seven white vertebral blotches between nape and sacrum and six to seven pairs of short white bars on flanks between limb insertions, 1–4 internasals, 30–32 ventral scale rows between weak ventrolateral folds, 14–18 precloacal pores in males, 10–14 longitudinal rows of smooth dorsal tubercles, 14–16 broad lamellae beneath digit I of pes, 17–19 broad lamellae beneath digit IV of pes, and a single transverse row of enlarged tubercles along the posterior portion of dorsum of each tail segment.

== Distribution ==
It is known from Cà Ná cape, Thuận Nam District, Ninh Thuận Province, Nam Trung Bộ, Vietnam.
