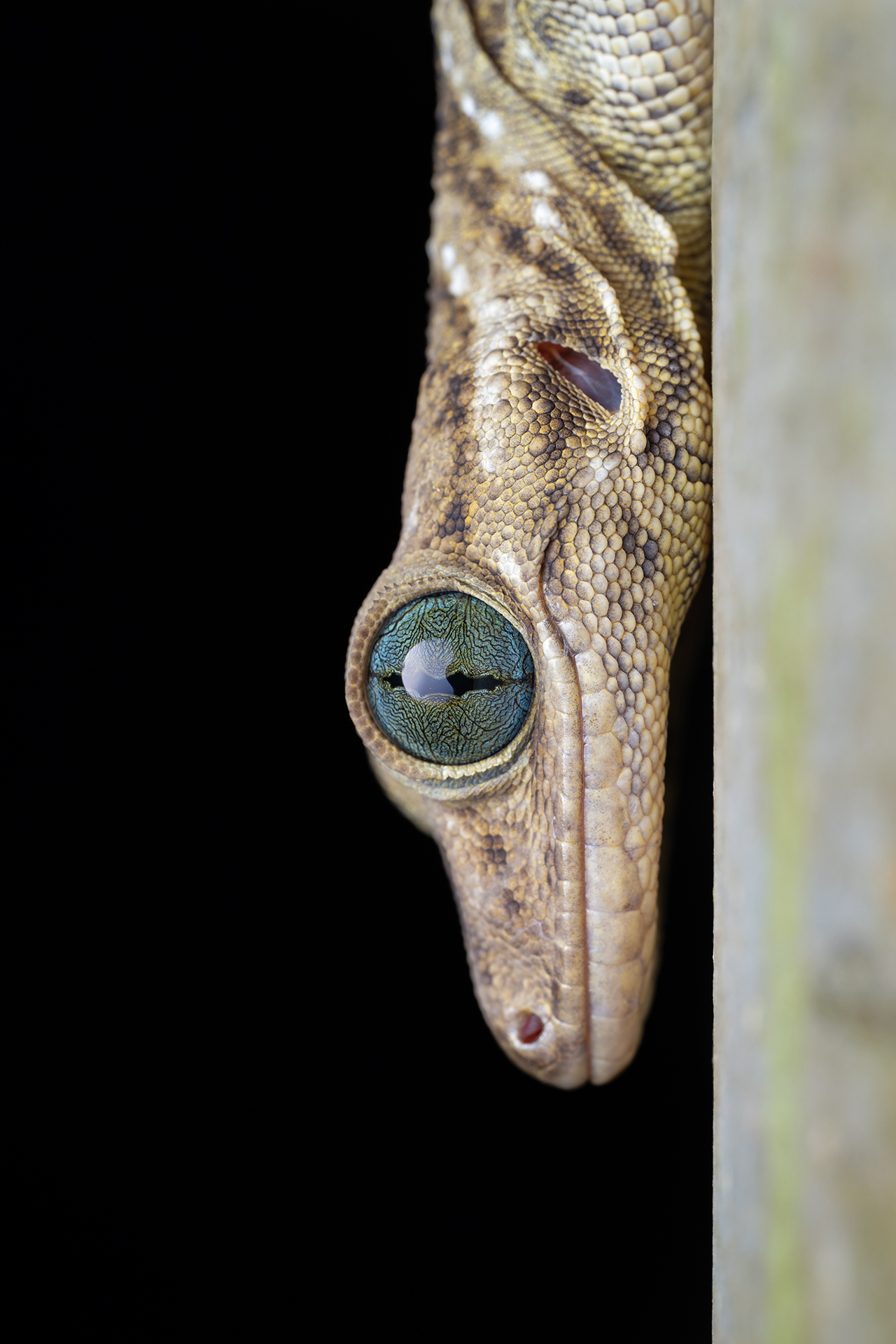

Scientific classification
- Kingdom: Animalia
- Phylum: Chordata
- Class: Reptilia
- Order: Squamata
- Suborder: Gekkota
- Family: Gekkonidae
- Genus: Gekko
- Species: G. stoliczkai

Binomial name
- Gekko stoliczkai Chandramouli, Gokulakrishnan, Sivaperuman, & Grismer, 2021

= Gekko stoliczkai =

Species of lizard

Gekko stoliczkai is a species of gecko. It is endemic to the Nicobar Islands.
