= Naden gecko =

Scientific classification
- Kingdom: Animalia
- Phylum: Chordata
- Class: Reptilia
- Order: Squamata
- Suborder: Gekkota
- Family: Gekkonidae
- Genus: Gekko
- Species: G. nadenensis

Binomial name
- Gekko nadenensis Luu, Nguyen, Le, Bonkowski, & Ziegler, 2017

Species of gecko

The Naden gecko (Gekko nadenensis) is a species of gecko. It is endemic to central Laos.
