= Mindoro narrow-disked gecko =

Conservation status
- Least Concern (IUCN 3.1)

Scientific classification
- Kingdom: Animalia
- Phylum: Chordata
- Class: Reptilia
- Order: Squamata
- Suborder: Gekkota
- Family: Gekkonidae
- Genus: Gekko
- Species: G. mindorensis

Binomial name
- Gekko mindorensis Taylor, 1919

Species of lizard

The Mindoro narrow-disked gecko (Gekko mindorensis) is a species of gecko. It is endemic to the Philippines.

== Lifespan ==
These geckos typically live for 5 to 10 years.

== Diet ==
As insectivorous reptiles, they feed on a diverse range of invertebrates. Their menu includes various species of beetles, worms, spiders, and orthopterans. Their voracious and opportunistic feeding habits help them thrive in their natural habitat.

== Appearance ==
The Mindoro narrow-disked gecko is medium-sized, covered in smooth, rough-textured skin. Its body displays a distinct cream to light yellow coloration with dark brown banding. Males have larger heads and tails compared to females—a unique feature within this species. However, there are no prominent markings or other notably unique physical traits observed in this gecko.

== Behavior ==
These geckos are nocturnal and solitary. They excel at vertical climbing in their tropical habitats. Their camouflaged skin allows them to stealthily hunt insects at night. Additionally, males exhibit territorial behavior,
