= Mingtao's gecko =

Scientific classification
- Kingdom: Animalia
- Phylum: Chordata
- Class: Reptilia
- Order: Squamata
- Suborder: Gekkota
- Family: Gekkonidae
- Genus: Gekko
- Species: G. taibaiensis

Binomial name
- Gekko taibaiensis Song, 1985

Species of lizard

Mingtao's gecko (Gekko taibaiensis) is a species of gecko, a lizard in the family Gekkonidae. The species is endemic to China.

== Geographic range ==
G. taibaiensis is known only from Taibai County in Shaanxi Province, China.

== Habitat ==
The holotype, allotype, and 25 paratypes of G. taibaiensis were all collected at an altitude of 950 m (3,120 ft).

== Description ==
G. taibaiensis resembles G. japonicus and G. swinhonis. However, G. taibaiensis has fewer preanal pores, only 4–6, which are interruptedly arranged.

== Reproduction ==
G. taibaiensis is oviparous.
