= Vietnam gecko =

Conservation status
- Vulnerable (IUCN 3.1)

Scientific classification
- Kingdom: Animalia
- Phylum: Chordata
- Class: Reptilia
- Order: Squamata
- Suborder: Gekkota
- Family: Gekkonidae
- Genus: Gekko
- Species: G. vietnamensis

Binomial name
- Gekko vietnamensis Sang, 2010

Species of lizard

The Vietnam gecko (Gekko vietnamensis) is a species of gecko. It is endemic to Vietnam.
