= Gekko scientiadventura =

Scientific classification
- Kingdom: Animalia
- Phylum: Chordata
- Class: Reptilia
- Order: Squamata
- Suborder: Gekkota
- Family: Gekkonidae
- Genus: Gekko
- Species: G. scientiadventura

Binomial name
- Gekko scientiadventura Rösler, Ziegler, Vu, Herrmann, & Böhme, 2004
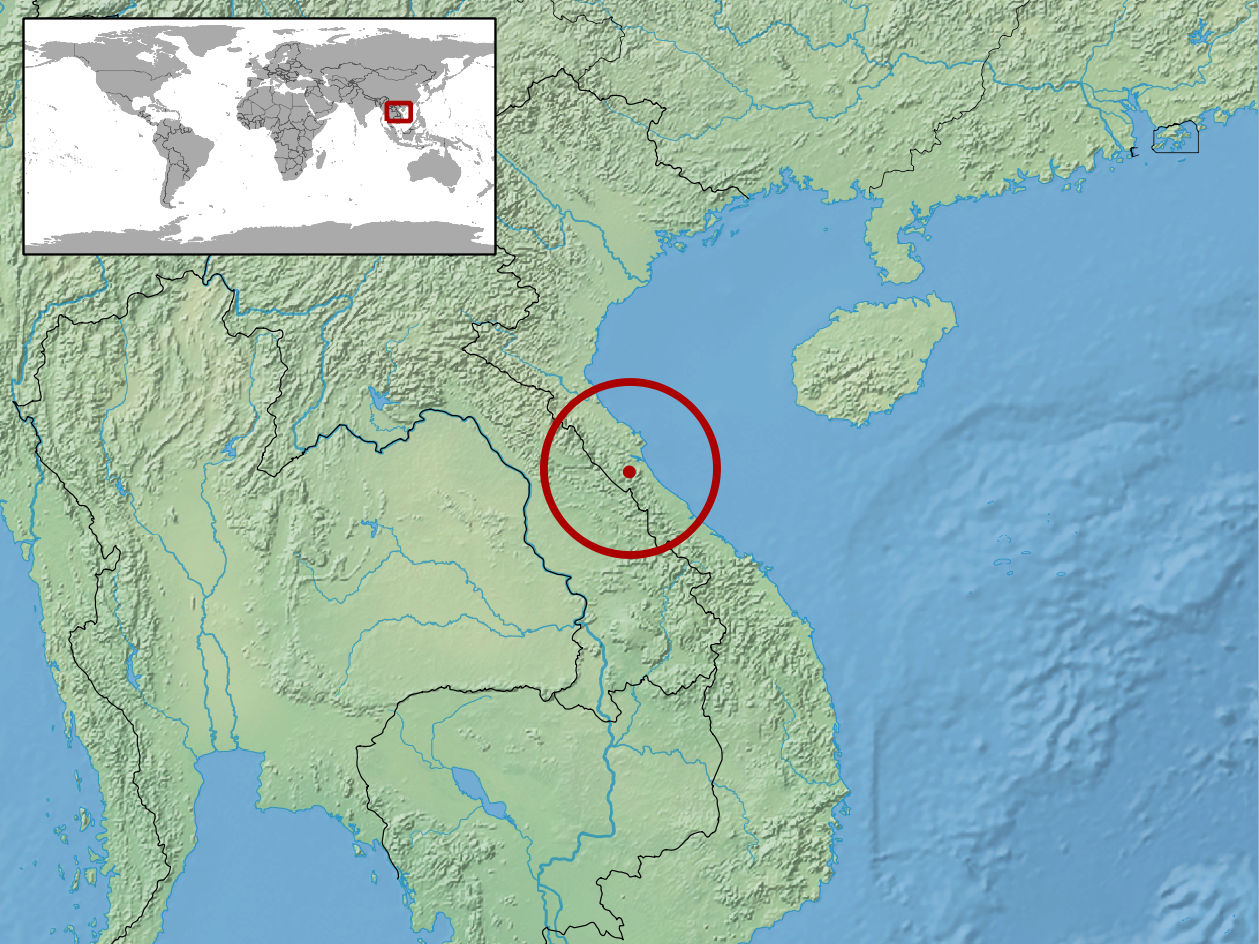

Species of lizard

Gekko scientiadventura is a species of gecko. It is endemic to Vietnam.
