= Gekko jinjiangensis =

Scientific classification
- Kingdom: Animalia
- Phylum: Chordata
- Class: Reptilia
- Order: Squamata
- Suborder: Gekkota
- Family: Gekkonidae
- Genus: Gekko
- Species: G. jinjiangensis

Binomial name
- Gekko jinjiangensis Hou, Shi, Wang, Shu, Zheng, Qi, Liu, Jiang, & Xie, 2021

Species of lizard

Gekko jinjiangensis is a species of gecko. It is found in the Jinsha River area, where the species gets its specific epithet. It is nocturnal and inhabits on dry cliffs and the walls of buildings.
