= Gekko kabkaebin =

Scientific classification
- Kingdom: Animalia
- Phylum: Chordata
- Class: Reptilia
- Order: Squamata
- Suborder: Gekkota
- Family: Gekkonidae
- Genus: Gekko
- Species: G. kabkaebin

Binomial name
- Gekko kabkaebin Grismer, Wood, Grismer, Quah, Thy, Phimmachak, Sivongxay, Seateun, Stuart, Siler, Mulcahy, Anamza, & Brown, 2019

Synonyms
- Ptychozoon kabkaebin

Species of lizard

Gekko kabkaebin, the Lao parachute gecko, is a species of gecko. It is found in Laos.
