= Gekko romblon =

Conservation status
- Least Concern (IUCN 3.1)

Scientific classification
- Kingdom: Animalia
- Phylum: Chordata
- Class: Reptilia
- Order: Squamata
- Suborder: Gekkota
- Family: Gekkonidae
- Genus: Gekko
- Species: G. romblon

Binomial name
- Gekko romblon Brown & Alcala, 1978
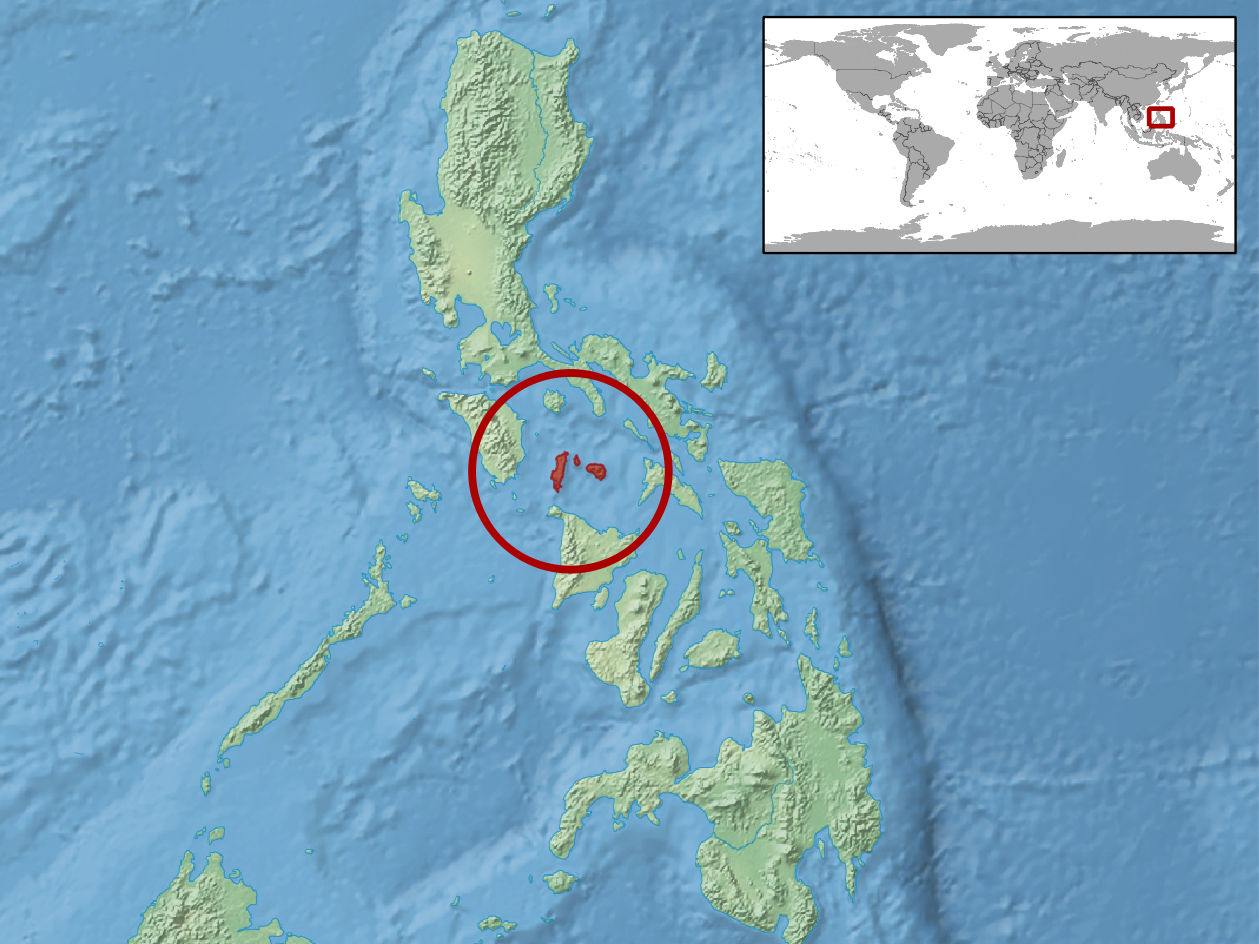

Species of lizard

Gekko romblon, also known as the Philippine gecko or the Romblon narrow-disked gecko, is a species of gecko. It is found in the Philippines.
