= Gekko remotus =

Scientific classification
- Kingdom: Animalia
- Phylum: Chordata
- Class: Reptilia
- Order: Squamata
- Suborder: Gekkota
- Family: Gekkonidae
- Genus: Gekko
- Species: G. remotus

Binomial name
- Gekko remotus Rösler, Ineich, Wilms, & Böhme, 2012

Species of lizard

Gekko remotus is a species of gecko. It is endemic to the Palau Islands.
