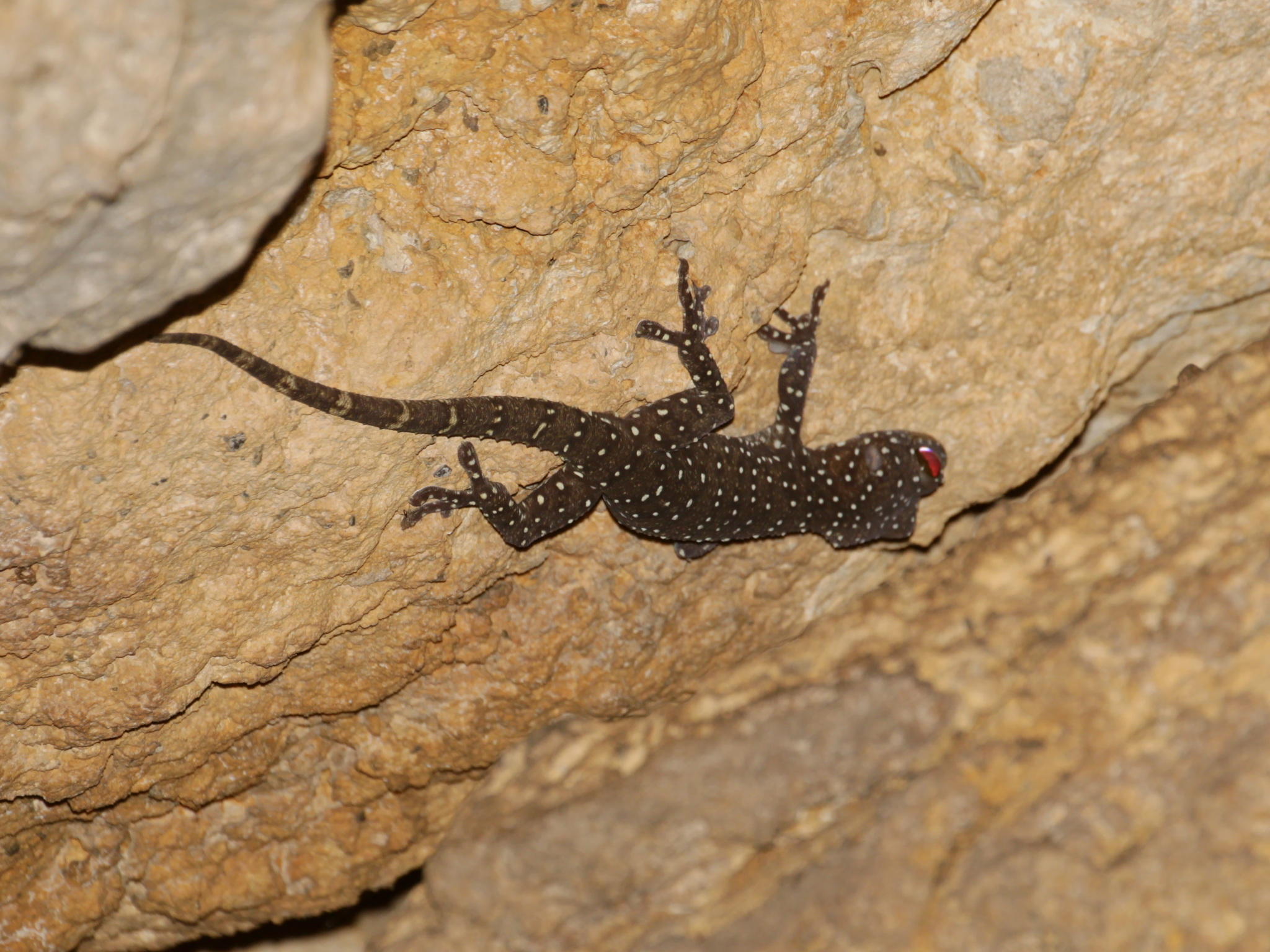
- Gekko pradapdao

Scientific classification
- Kingdom: Animalia
- Phylum: Chordata
- Class: Reptilia
- Order: Squamata
- Suborder: Gekkota
- Family: Gekkonidae
- Genus: Gekko
- Species: G. pradapdao

Binomial name
- Gekko pradapdao Meesok, Sumontha, Donbundit, & Pauwels, 2021

= Gekko pradapdao =

Species of lizard

Gekko pradapdao is a species of gecko. It is endemic to Thailand.
