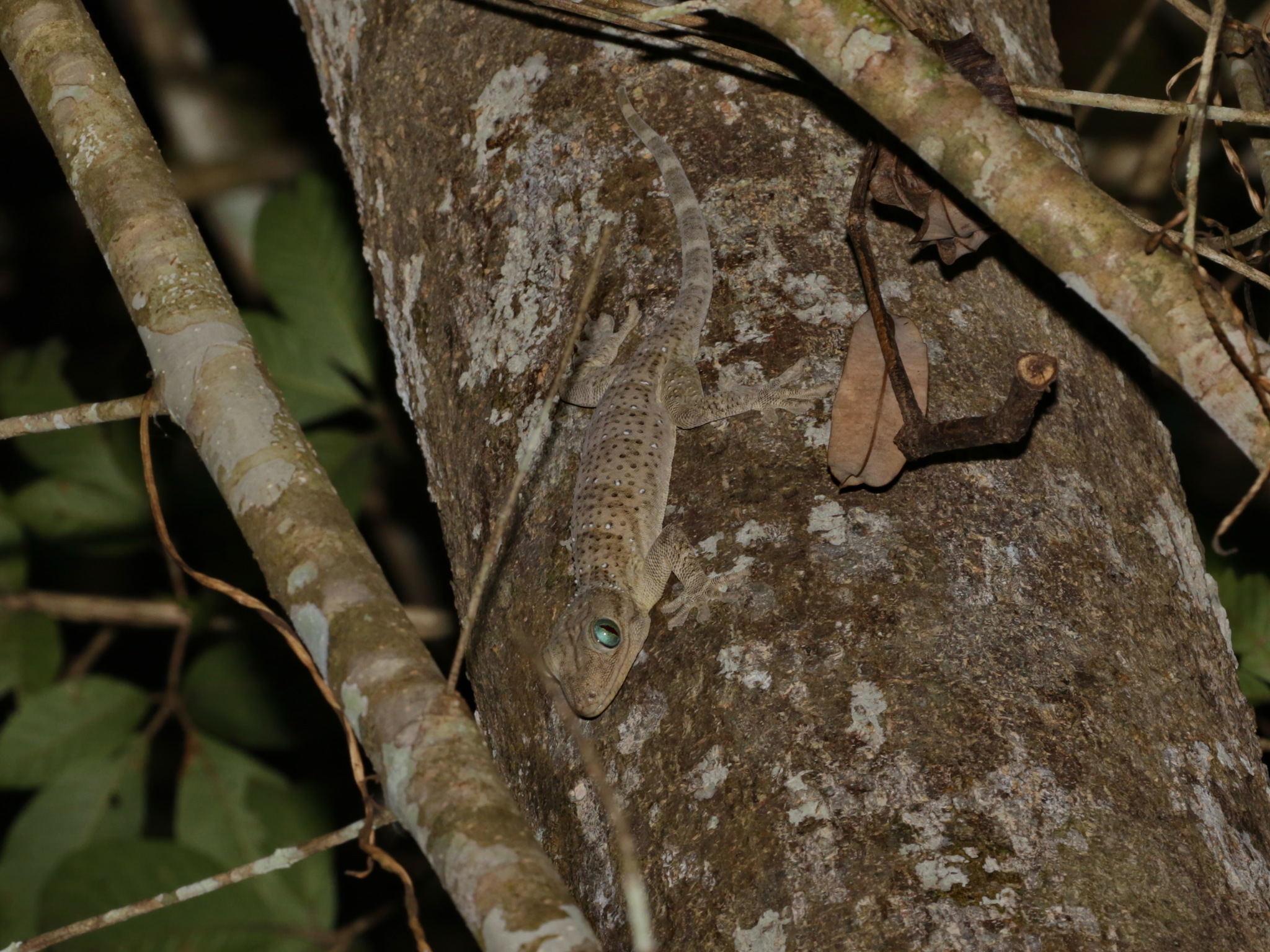

Scientific classification
- Kingdom: Animalia
- Phylum: Chordata
- Class: Reptilia
- Order: Squamata
- Suborder: Gekkota
- Family: Gekkonidae
- Genus: Gekko
- Species: G. hulk

Binomial name
- Gekko hulk L. Grismer, Pinto, Quah, Anuar, Cota, McGuire, Iskandar, Wood & J. Grismer, 2022

= Gekko hulk =

Species of lizard

Gekko hulk is a species of gecko, a lizard in the family Gekkonidae. The species is endemic to Peninsular Malaysia.

== Etymology ==
The specific name, hulk, refers to the fictional comic book and film hero "The Incredible Hulk", who is large, green-skinned, muscular, and aggressive like this species.

== Description ==
G. hulk may attain a snout-to-vent length (SVL) of 16 cm (6.3 in).

== Diet ==
G. hulk preys upon arthropods and smaller geckos.

== Reproduction ==
G. hulk is oviparous. Clutch size is two to three eggs.
