= Sengchanthavong's gecko =

Conservation status
- Vulnerable (IUCN 3.1)

Scientific classification
- Kingdom: Animalia
- Phylum: Chordata
- Class: Reptilia
- Order: Squamata
- Suborder: Gekkota
- Family: Gekkonidae
- Genus: Gekko
- Species: G. sengchanthavongi

Binomial name
- Gekko sengchanthavongi Luu, Calame, Nguyen, Le & Ziegler, 2015

Species of lizard

Sengchanthavong's gecko (Gekko sengchanthavongi) is a species of lizard in the family Gekkonidae. The species is endemic to Laos.

== Etymology ==
The specific name, sengchanthavongi, is in honor of Sinnasone Sengchanthavong of the Office of Natural Resources and Environment, Khammouane Province, Laos.

== Geographic range ==
G. sengchanthavongi is found in central Laos, in Khammouane Province.

== Habitat ==
The preferred natural habitats of G. sengchanthavongi are forest and rocky areas, at an altitude of about 200 m (660 ft).

== Description ==
Medium-sized for its genus, G. sengchanthavongi has an average snout-to-vent length (SVL) of 72.5 mm (2.85 in), and a maximum SVL of 77.3 mm (3.04 in).
