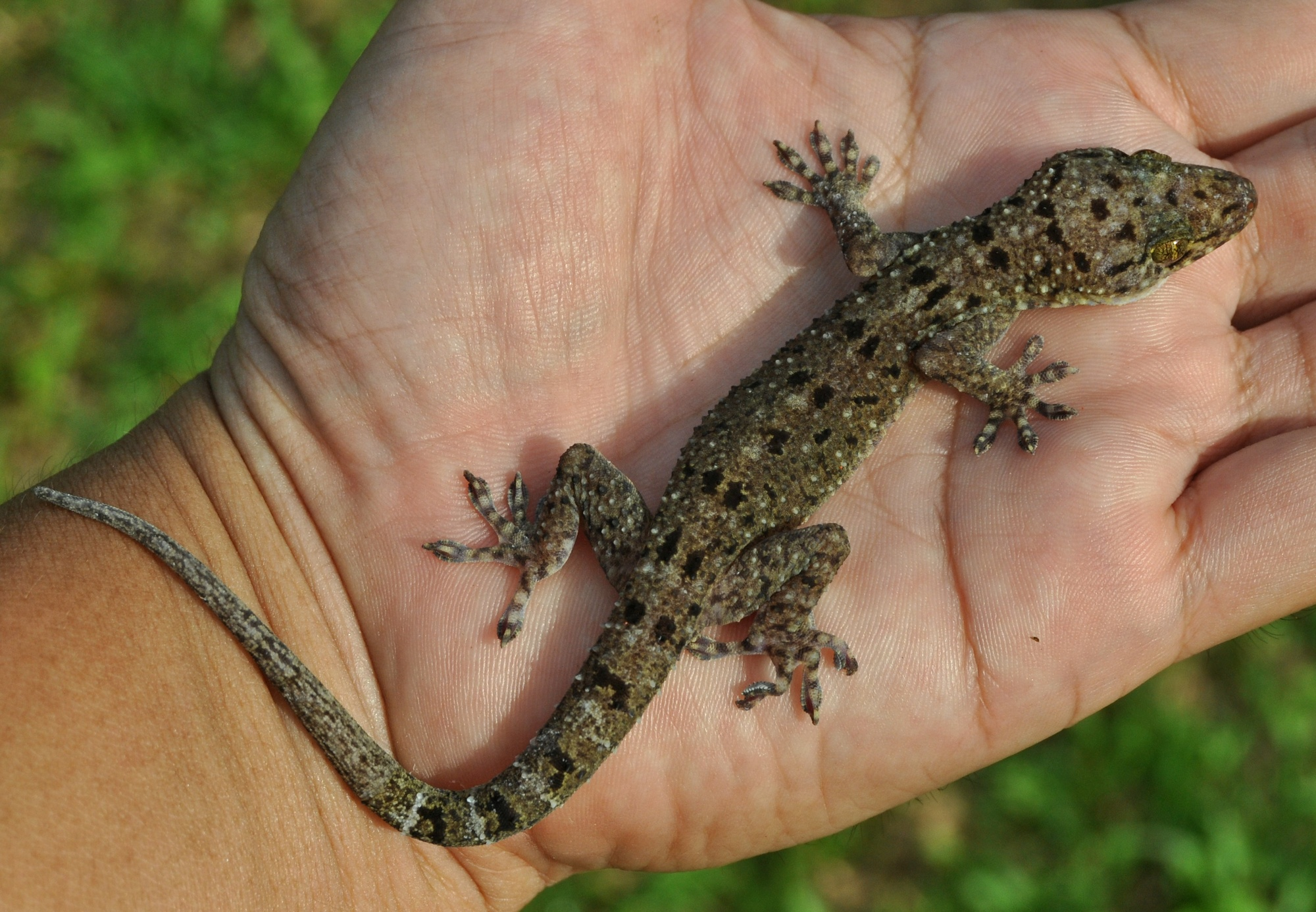

Scientific classification
- Kingdom: Animalia
- Phylum: Chordata
- Class: Reptilia
- Order: Squamata
- Suborder: Gekkota
- Family: Gekkonidae
- Genus: Gekko
- Species: G. monarchus

Binomial name
- Gekko monarchus (Schlegel, 1836)

Synonyms
- Platydactylus monarchus Schlegel in Duméril and Bibron, 1836; Gekko tuberculatus; Platydactylus burmeisteri; Platydactylus deissneri

= Gekko monarchus =

Species of lizard

Gekko monarchus, also called the spotted house gecko, is a species of gecko found in the Malay Peninsula (including southern Thailand and Singapore), some smaller Malaysian islands, Borneo (Brunei, East Malaysia and Kalimantan), the Philippines, many Indonesian islands including Sumatra, Java, Sulawesi, and New Guinea (Irian Jaya and Papua New Guinea).

== Characteristics ==
- This lizard has the typical body build of the genus Gekko - it appears flat and has a rough skin with small bumps on its back.
- Their tails regenerate once dropped, as with most gecko species. The regenerated tail will never look the same as the original (it has a different texture and slightly odd color).
- Similar to common house geckos and dtellas, males make quiet clicking sounds when courting a female; both sexes are capable of chirping and "barking". When startled or alarmed, the gecko waves its tail quickly and may breathe heavily, making a sound not unlike hissing.
- They have a W spot on the backs of their heads, typical for this species.
- Monarch geckos are strictly insectivorous, feeding on various types of insects (roaches, crickets, flies, spiders, even wasps).
