= Libo's gecko =

Scientific classification
- Kingdom: Animalia
- Phylum: Chordata
- Class: Reptilia
- Order: Squamata
- Suborder: Gekkota
- Family: Gekkonidae
- Genus: Gekko
- Species: G. liboensis

Binomial name
- Gekko liboensis Zhou, Liu, & Li, 1982

Species of lizard

Libo's gecko (Gekko liboensis) is a species of gecko. It is endemic to Southern China (Guizhou and Guangxi provinces). Libo is a county in Guizhou, China.
