= Gekko popaense =

Scientific classification
- Kingdom: Animalia
- Phylum: Chordata
- Class: Reptilia
- Order: Squamata
- Suborder: Gekkota
- Family: Gekkonidae
- Genus: Gekko
- Species: G. popaense

Binomial name
- Gekko popaense Grismer, Wood, Thura, Grismer, Brown, & Stuart, 2018

Synonyms
- Ptychozoon popaense

Species of lizard

The Mt. Popa parachute gecko (Gekko popaense) is a species of gecko. It is endemic to Myanmar.
