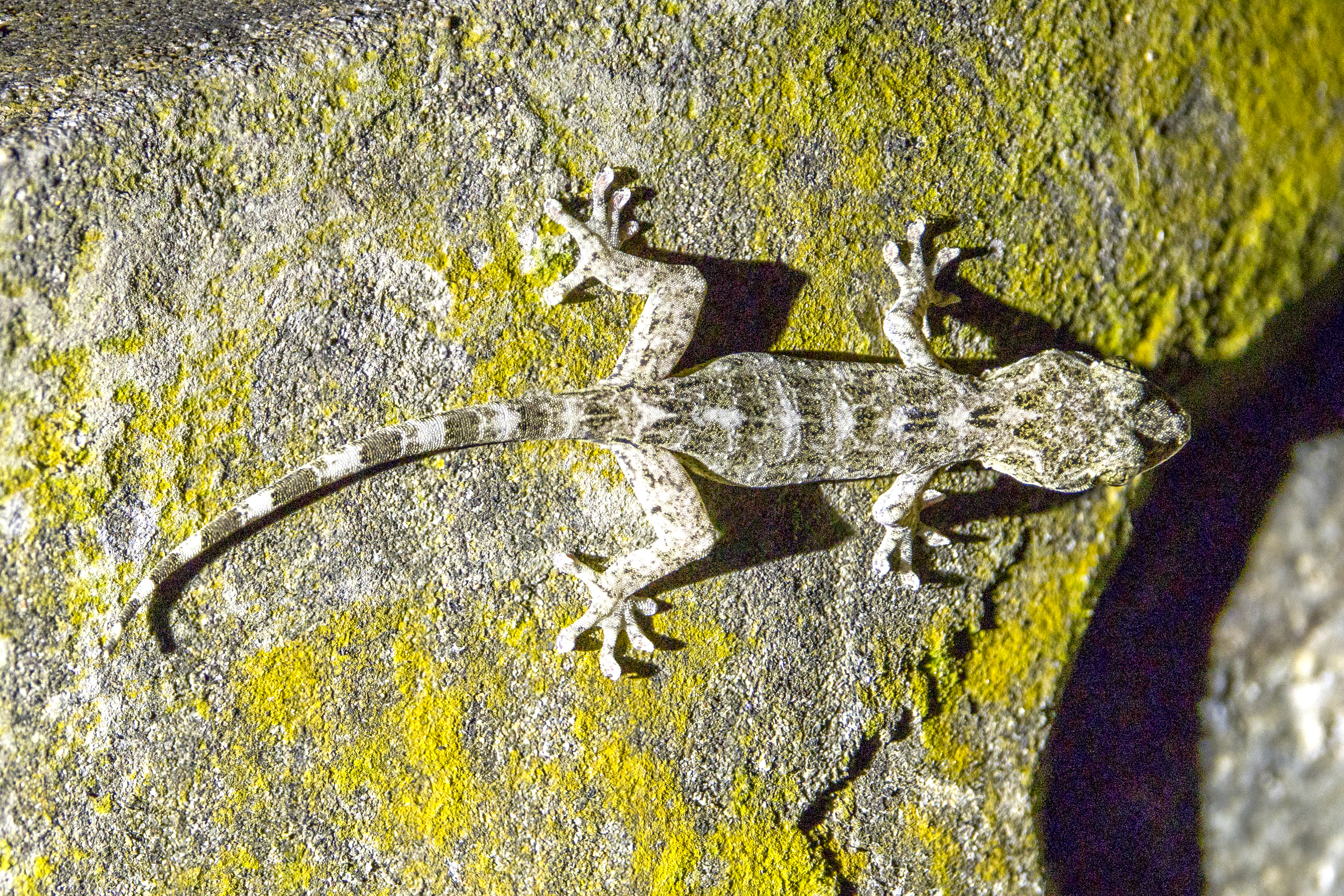

Conservation status
- Least Concern (IUCN 3.1)

Scientific classification
- Kingdom: Animalia
- Phylum: Chordata
- Class: Reptilia
- Order: Squamata
- Suborder: Gekkota
- Family: Gekkonidae
- Genus: Gekko
- Species: G. chinensis

Binomial name
- Gekko chinensis (Gray, 1842)
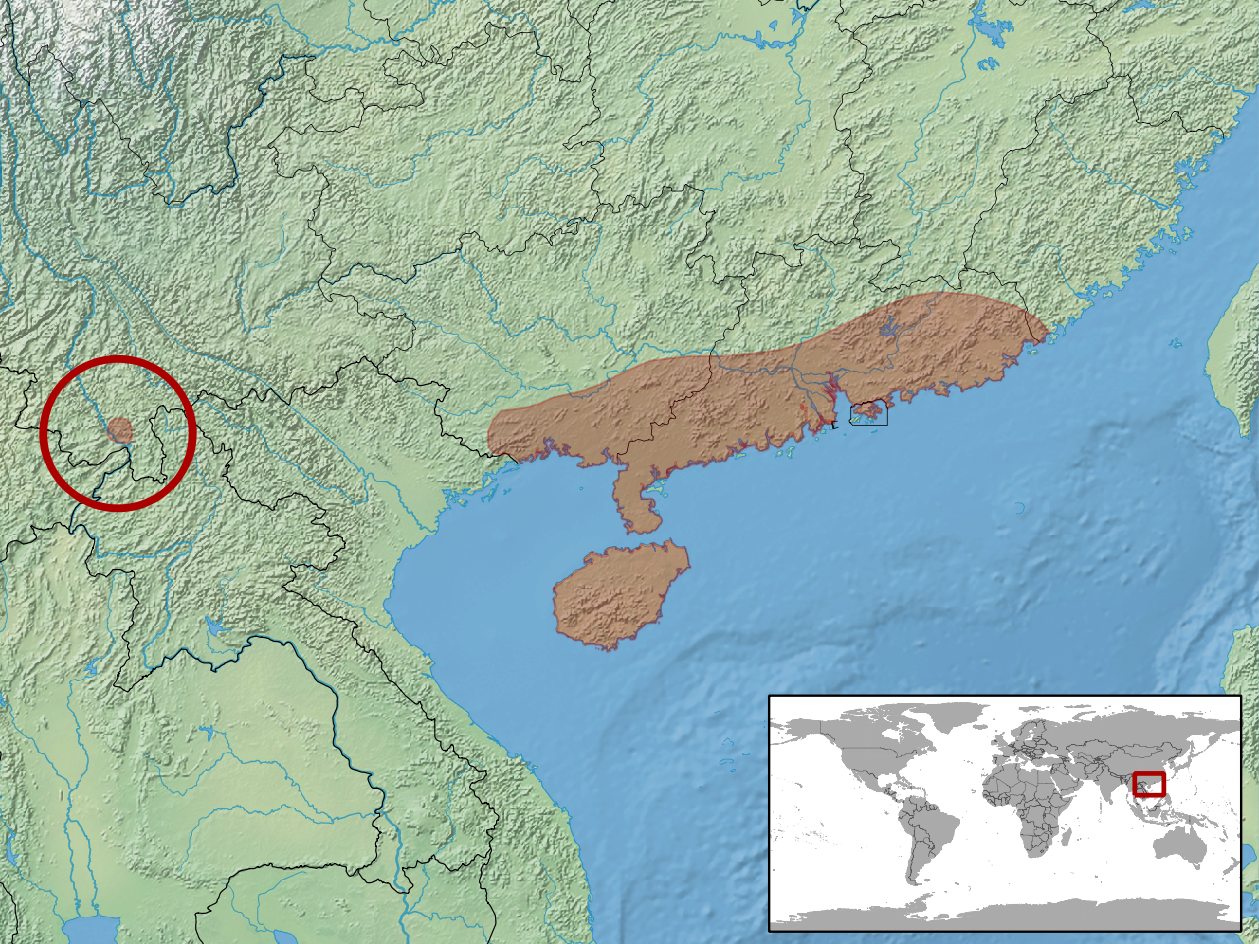

Synonyms
- Gecko chinensis Gray, 1842; Gekko scabridus Liu and Zhou, 1982

= Gray's Chinese gecko =

Species of lizard

Gray's Chinese gecko (Gekko chinensis) is a species of gecko. It is endemic to southern China (Fujian, Guangdong, Guangxi, Yunnan) and Hong Kong.
