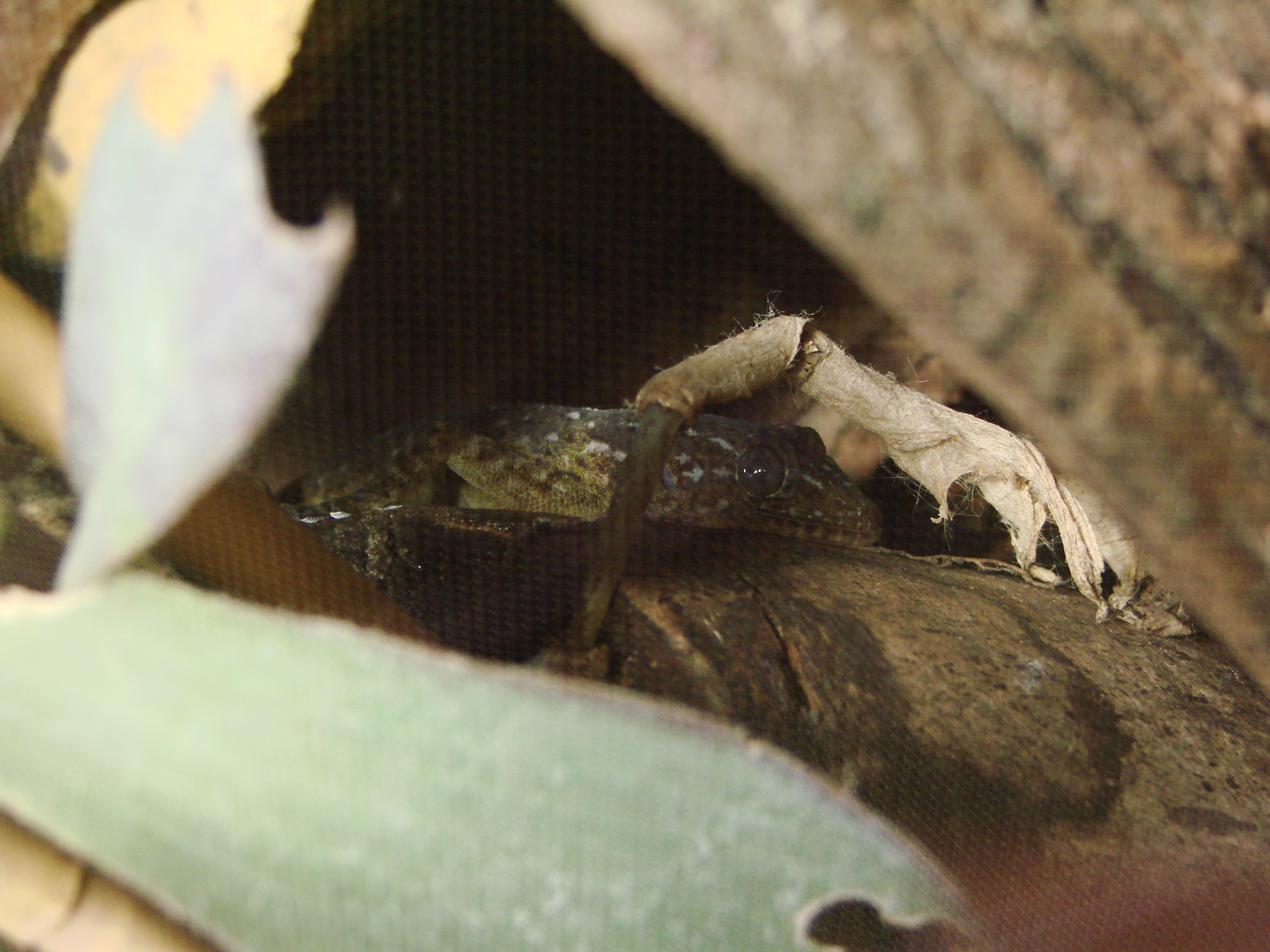

Scientific classification
- Kingdom: Animalia
- Phylum: Chordata
- Class: Reptilia
- Order: Squamata
- Suborder: Gekkota
- Family: Gekkonidae
- Genus: Gekko
- Species: G. petricolus

Binomial name
- Gekko petricolus Taylor, 1962

Synonyms
- Gekko petricola

= Gekko petricolus =

Species of lizard

Gekko petricolus, also known as the sandstone gecko or the Thai gecko, is a species of gecko. It is found in Thailand, Laos, and northern Cambodia.
