= List of reptiles of Sumatra =

This is a list of reptile species found in Sumatra, Indonesia.

== Order Crocodilia ==
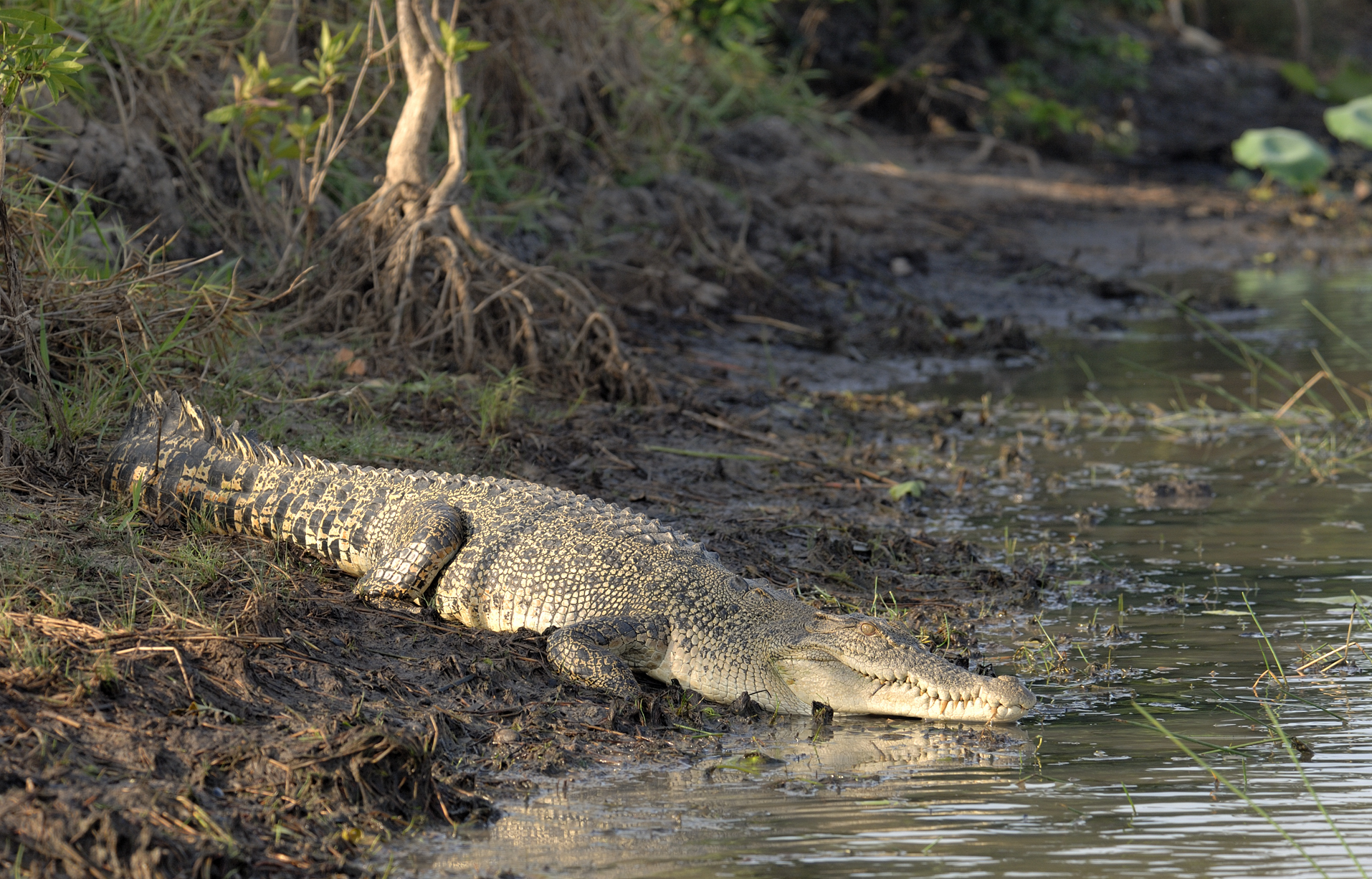
Crocodylus porosus

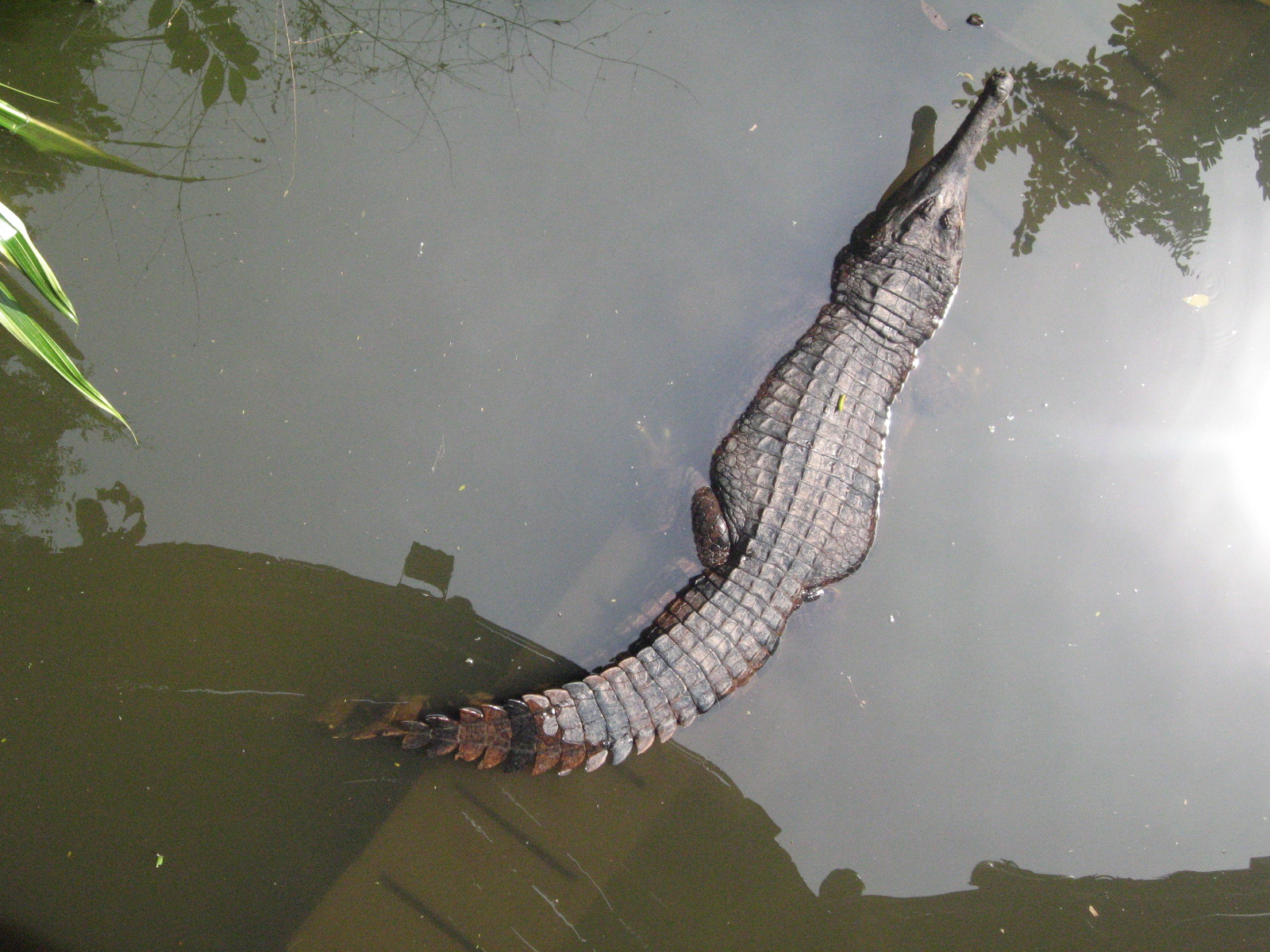
Tomistoma schlegelii

=== Family Crocodylidae ===
- Crocodylus porosus

=== Family Gavialidae ===
- Tomistoma schlegelii

== Order Testudines ==
=== Family Geoemydidae ===
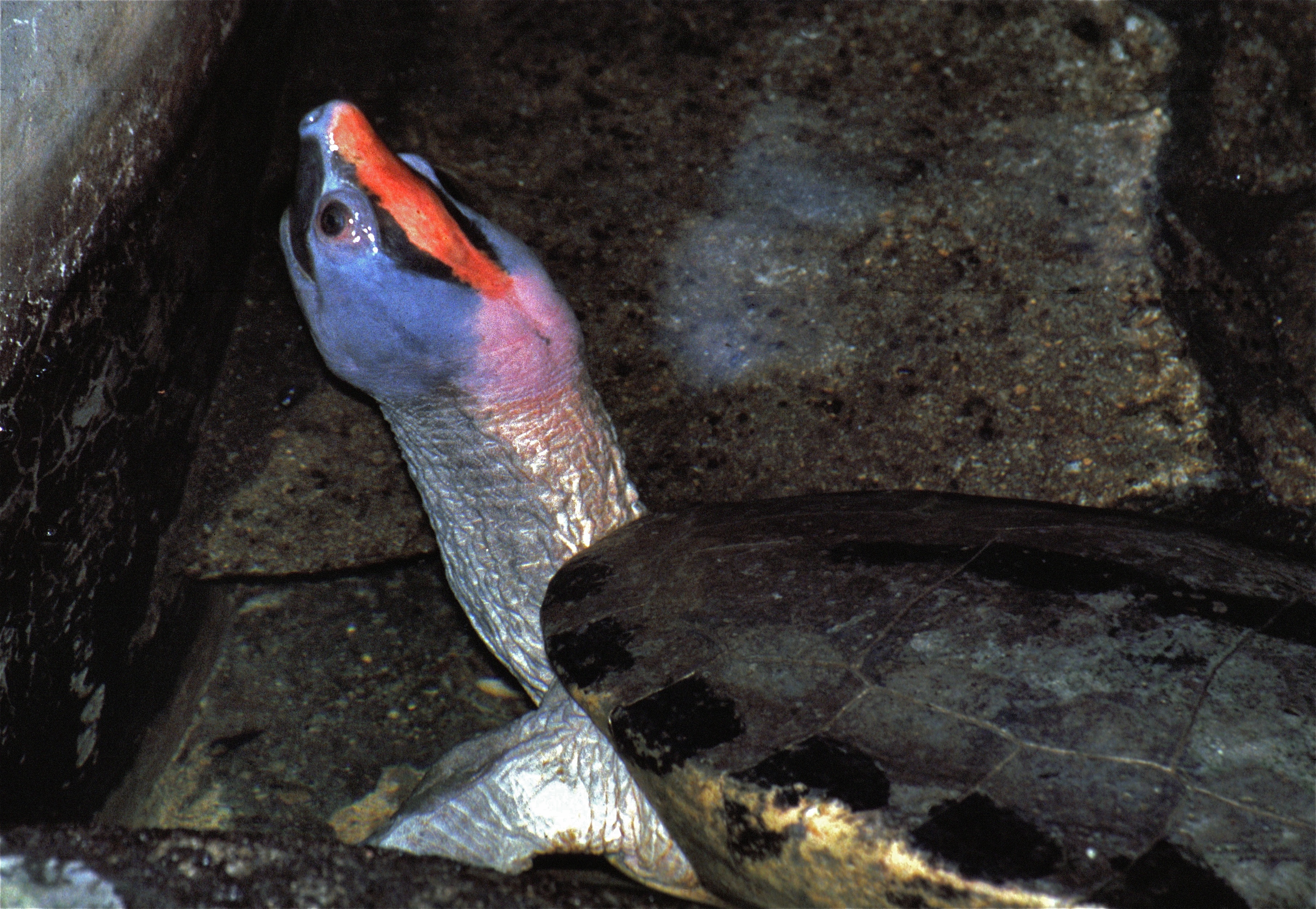
Batagur borneoensis

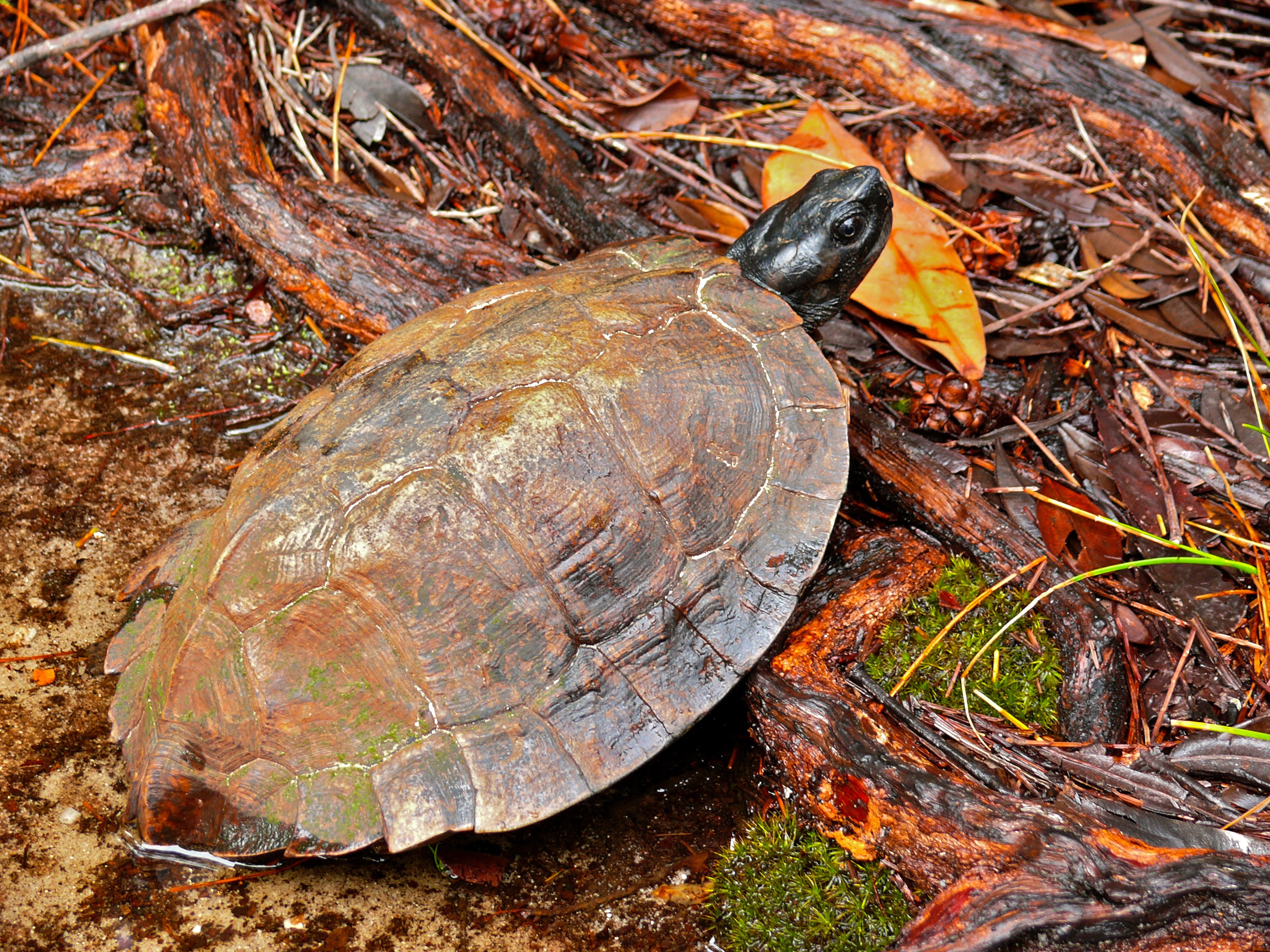
Cyclemys dentata

- Batagur affinis
- Batagur borneoensis
- Cuora couro
- Cyclemys dentata
- Cyclemys enigmatica
- Heosemys spinosa
- Notochelys platynota
- Orlitia borneensis
- Siebenrockiella crassicollis

=== Family Testudinidae ===
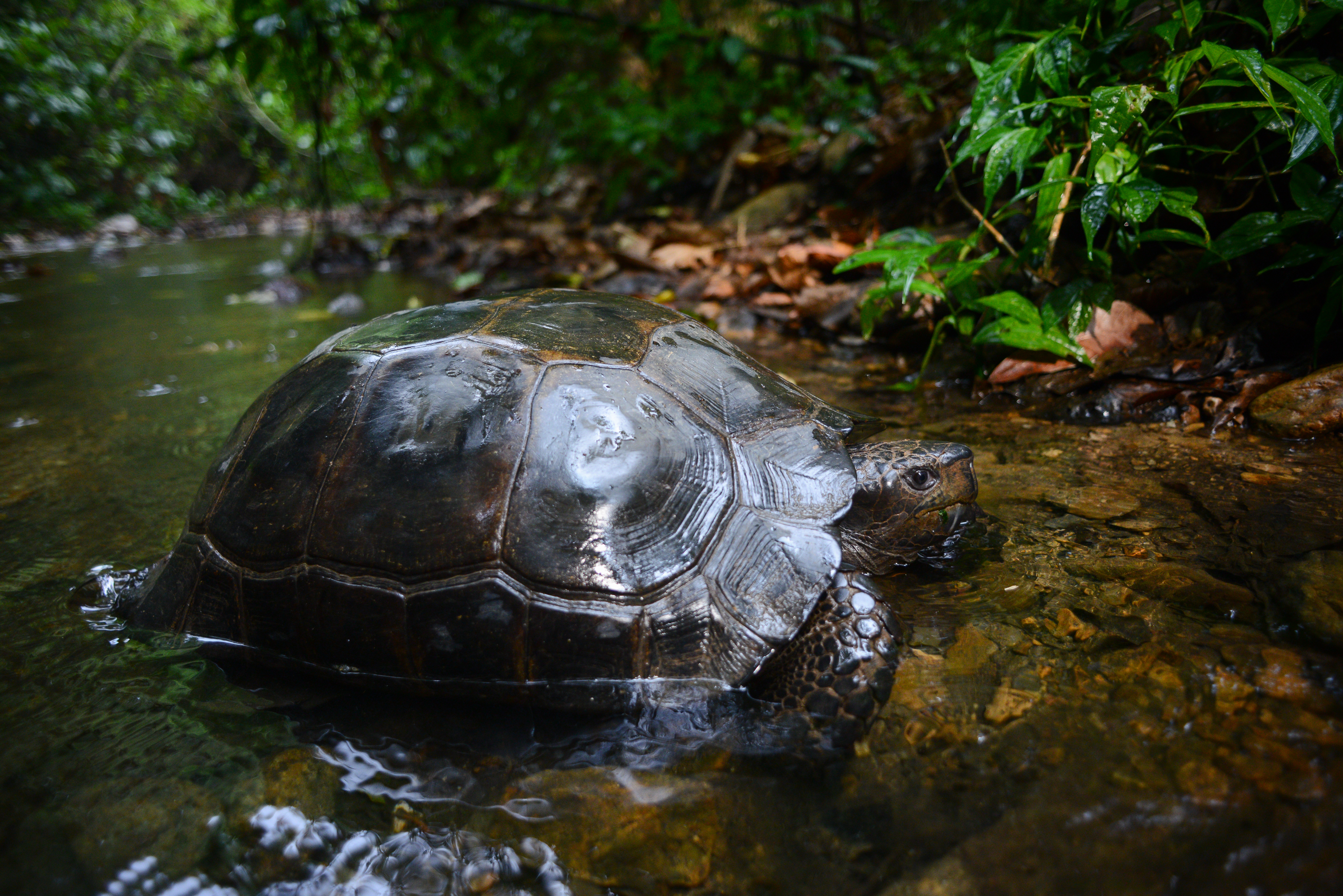
Manouria emys

- Manouria emys

=== Family Trionychidae ===
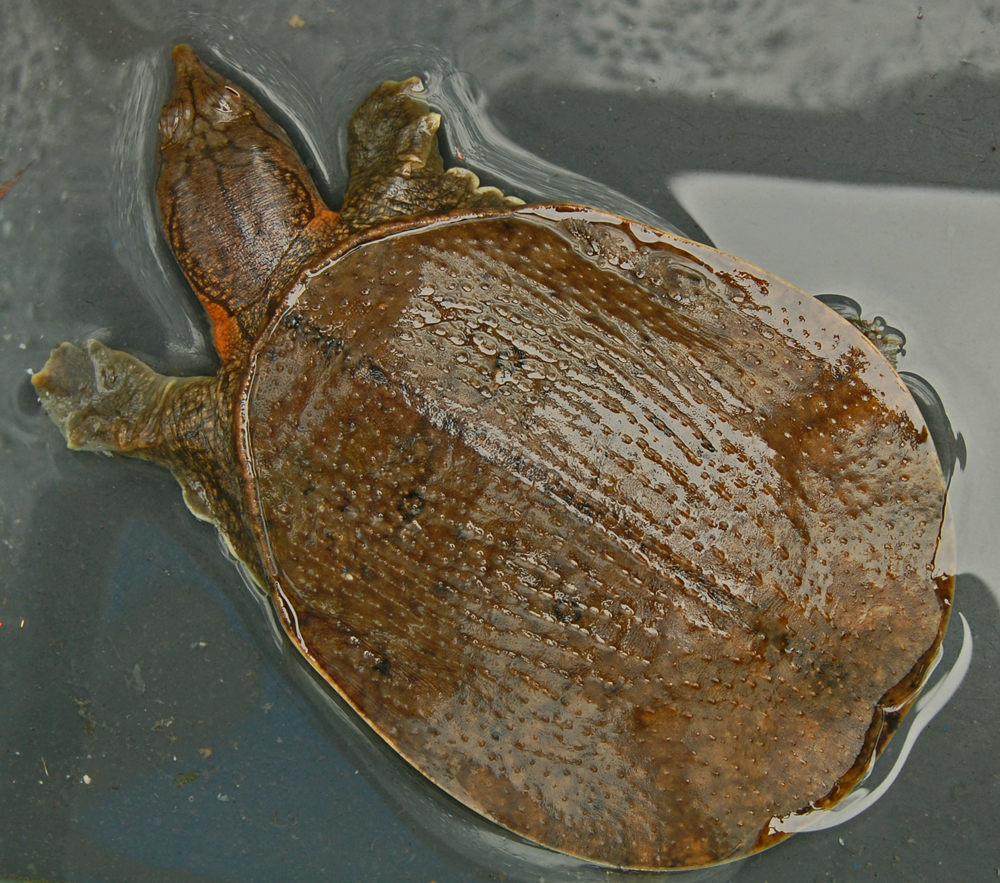
Dogania subplana

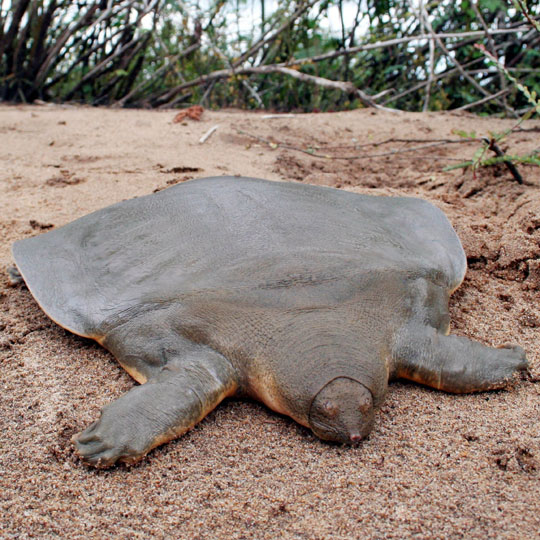
Pelochelys cantorii

- Amyda cartilaginea
- Chitra chitra
- Dogania subplana
- Pelochelys cantorii

== Order Squamata ==
=== Suborder Lacertilia ===
==== Family Agamidae ====
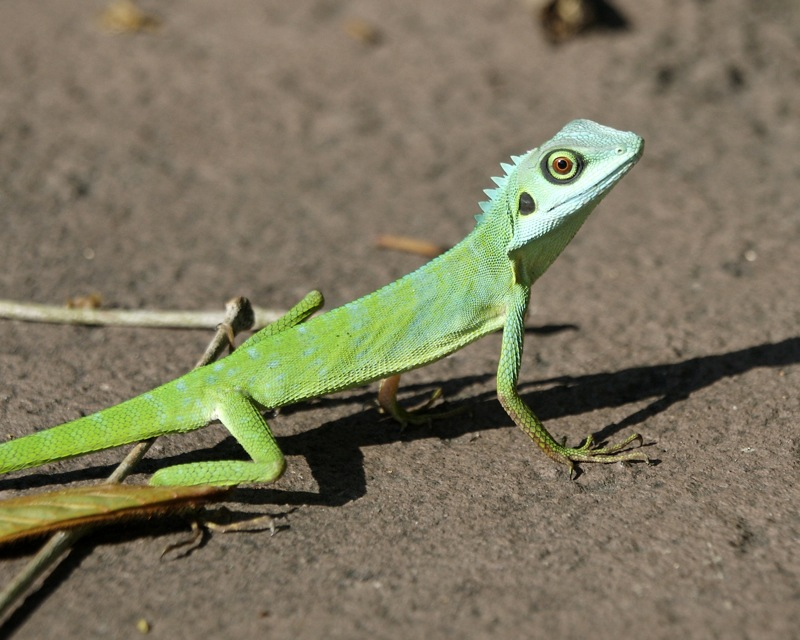
Bronchocela cristatella

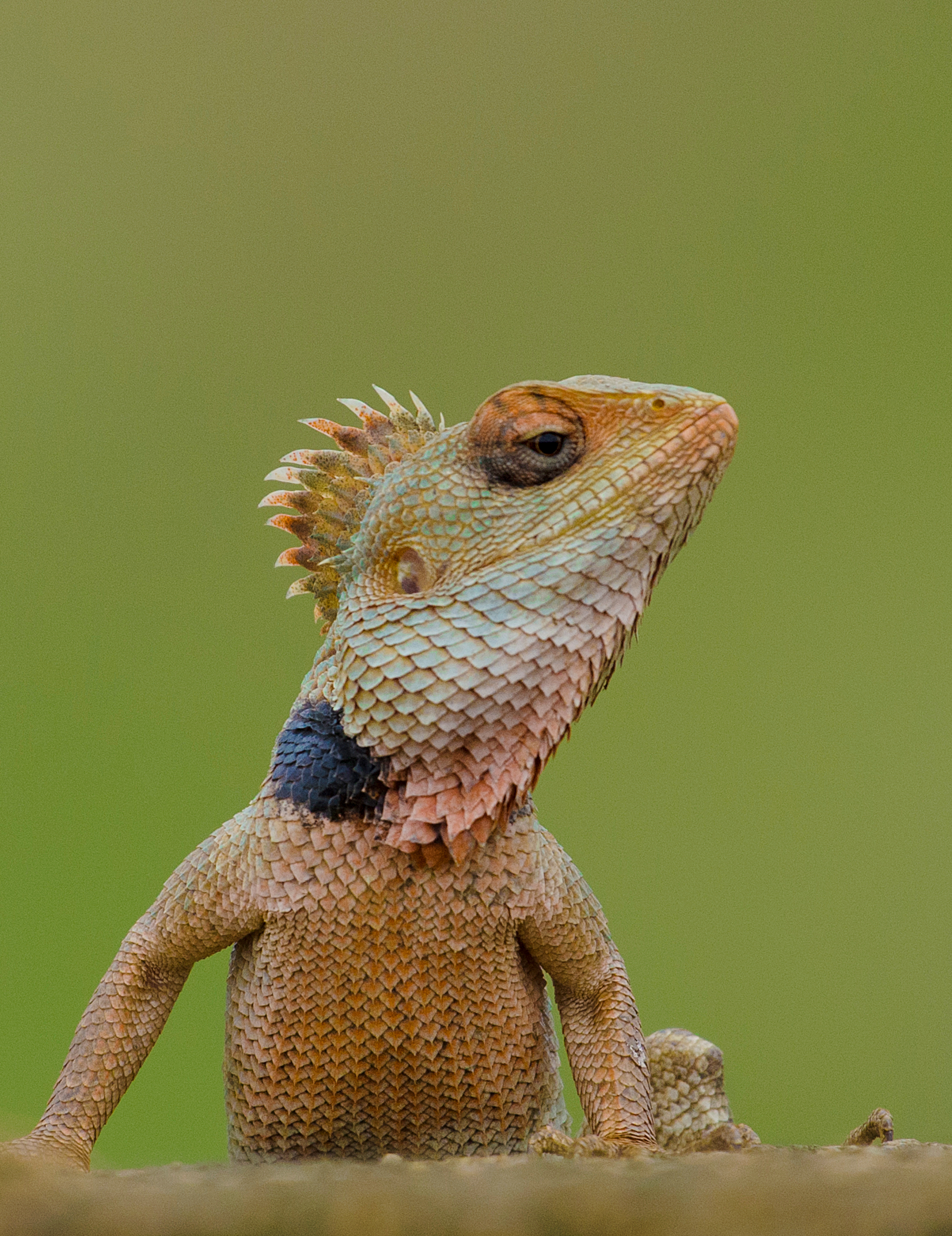
Calotes versicolor

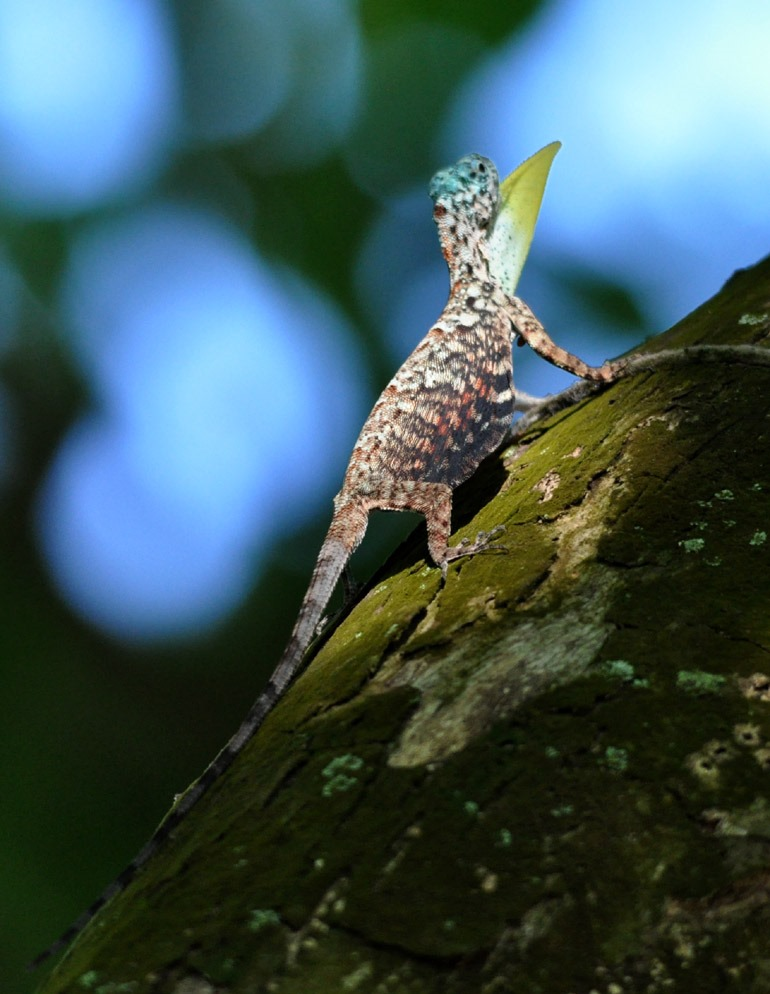
Draco sumatranus

- Acanthosaura armata
- Aphaniotis acutirostris
- Aphaniotis fusca
- Aphaniotis kumbakarna
- Bronchocela cristatella
- Bronchocela hayeki
- Bronchocela jubata
- Bronchocela octospinosa
- Dendragama australis
- Dendragama boulengeri
- Dendragama dioidema
- Dendragama schneideri
- Draco cornutus
- Draco fimbriatus
- Draco haematopogon
- Draco maximus
- Draco melanopogon
- Draco modiglianii (Enggano)
- Draco quinquefasciatus
- Draco sumatranus
- Gonocephalus beyschlagi
- Gonocephalus chamaeleontinus
- Gonocephalus doriae
- Gonocephalus grandis
- Gonocephalus inauris
- Gonocephalus klossi
- Gonocephalus kuhlii
- Gonocephalus lacunosus
- Gonocephalus liogaster
- Gonocephalus megalepis
- Gonocephalus pyrius
- Harpesaurus beccarii
- Harpesaurus ensicauda (Nias)
- Harpesaurus modiglianii
- Leiolepis belliana (Bangka)
- Lophocalotes achlios
- Lophocalotes ludekingi
- Phoxophrys tuberculata
- Pseudocalotes baliomus
- Pseudocalotes cybelidermus
- Pseudocalotes guttalineatus
- Pseudocalotes rhammanotus
- Pseudocalotes tympanistriga
- Thaumatorhynchus brooksi

==== Family Anguidae ====
- Dopasia wegneri

==== Family Dibamidae ====
- Dibamus dezwaani (Nias)
- Dibamus leucurus
- Dibamus tebal (Simeulue)

==== Family Eublepharidae ====
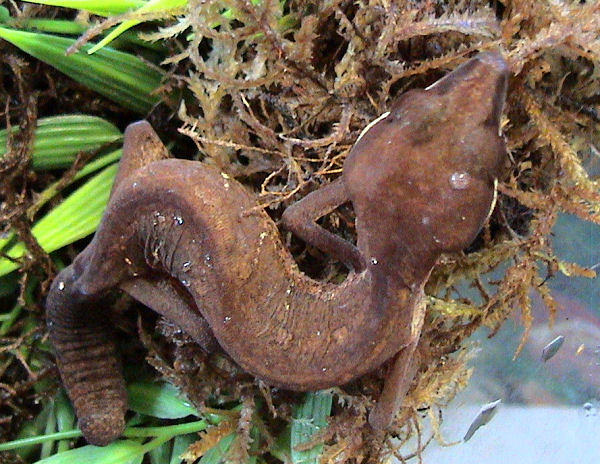
Aeluroscalabotes felinus

- Aeluroscalabotes felinus

==== Family Lacertidae ====
- Takydromus sexlineatus

==== Family Gekkonidae ====
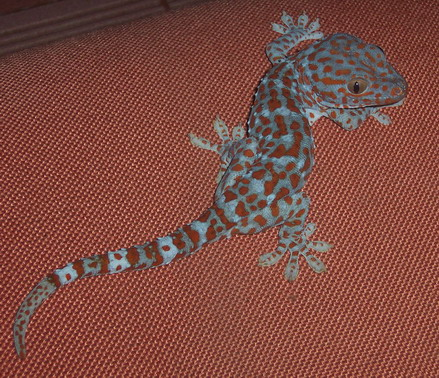
Gekko gecko

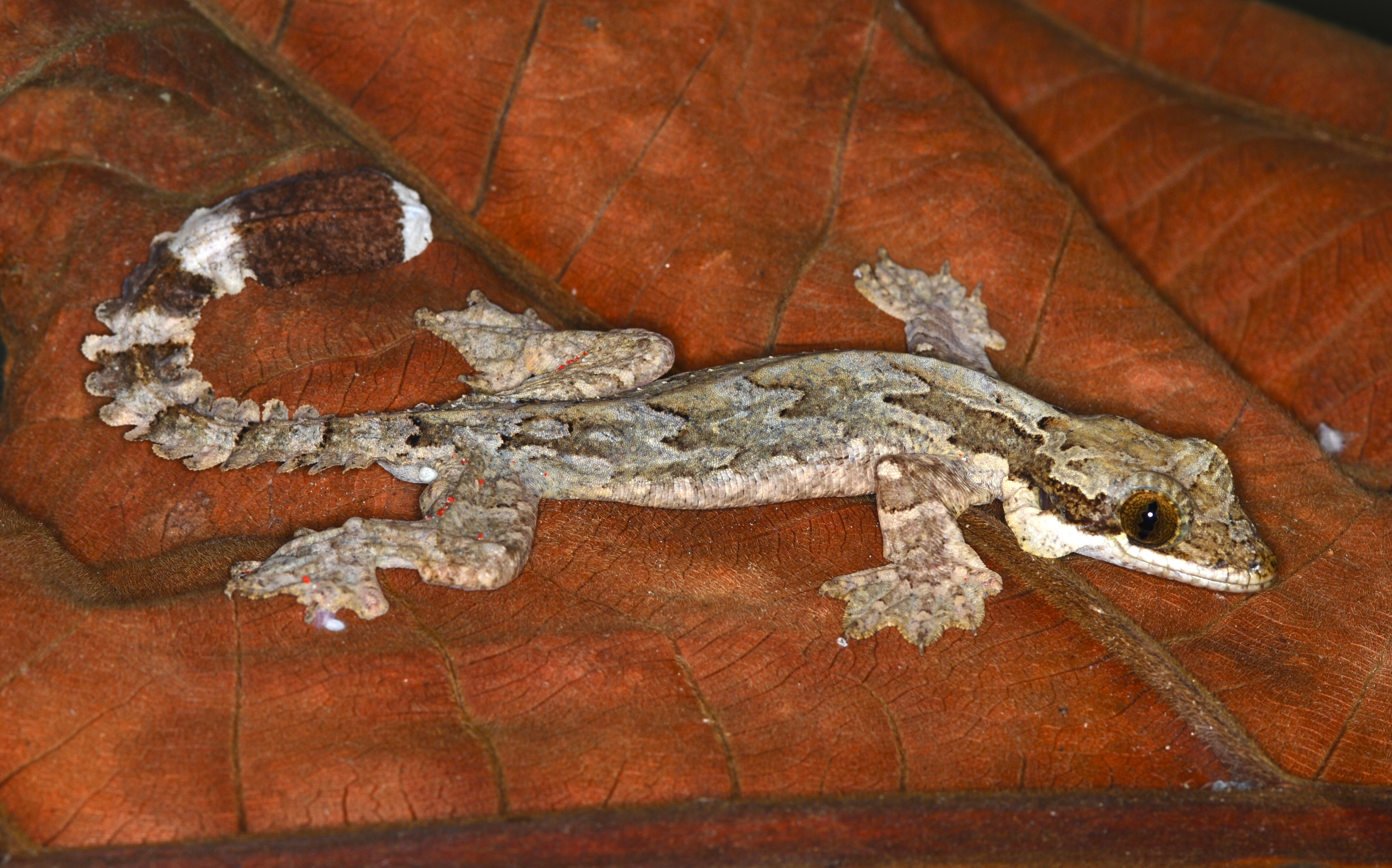
Ptychozoon kuhli

- Cnemaspis aceh
- Cnemaspis andalas
- Cnemaspis calderana
- Cnemaspis dezwaani
- Cnemaspis jacobsoni (Simeulue)
- Cnemaspis minang
- Cnemaspis modiglianii (Enggano)
- Cnemaspis pagai (Pagai)
- Cnemaspis purnamai (Belitung)
- Cnemaspis rajabasa
- Cnemaspis tapanuli
- Cnemaspis whittenorum (Siberut)
- Cyrtodactylus agamensis
- Cyrtodactylus awalriyantoi
- Cyrtodactylus gonjong
- Cyrtodactylus lateralis
- Cyrtodactylus majulah
- Cyrtodactylus maryantoi (Simeulue)
- Cyrtodactylus mursalaensis (Mursala)
- Cyrtodactylus psarops
- Cyrtodactylus semicinctus
- Gehyra mutilata
- Gekko albomaculatus
- Gekko brooksii
- Gekko gecko
- Gekko horsfieldii
- Gekko kuhli
- Gekko monarchus
- Hemidactylus frenatus
- Hemidactylus garnotii
- Hemidactylus platyurus
- Hemiphyllodactylus engganoensis (Enggano)
- Hemiphyllodactylus margarethae
- Hemiphyllodactylus typus
- Lepidodactylus lugubris (Riau Islands)

==== Family Scincidae ====
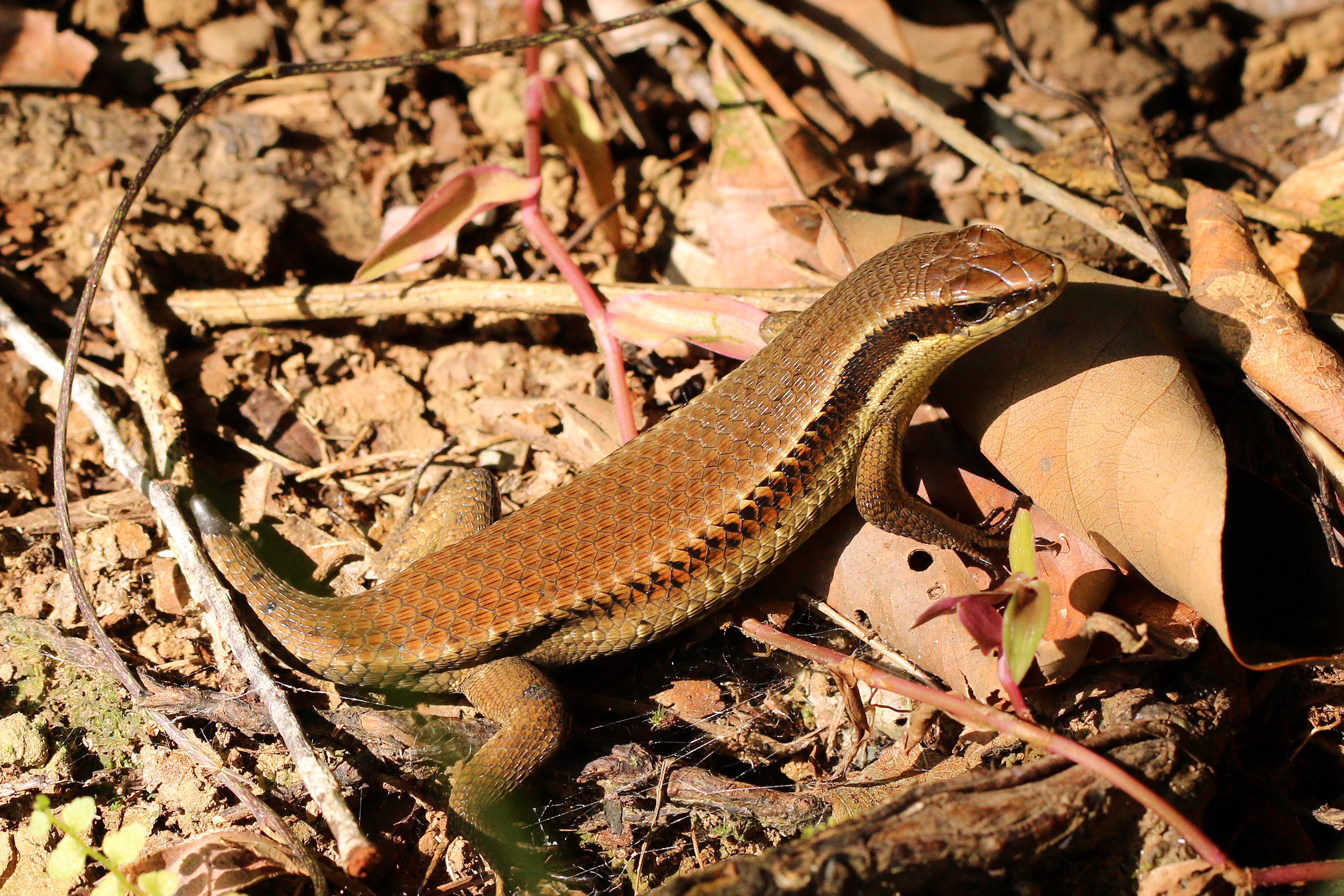
Eutropis multifasciata

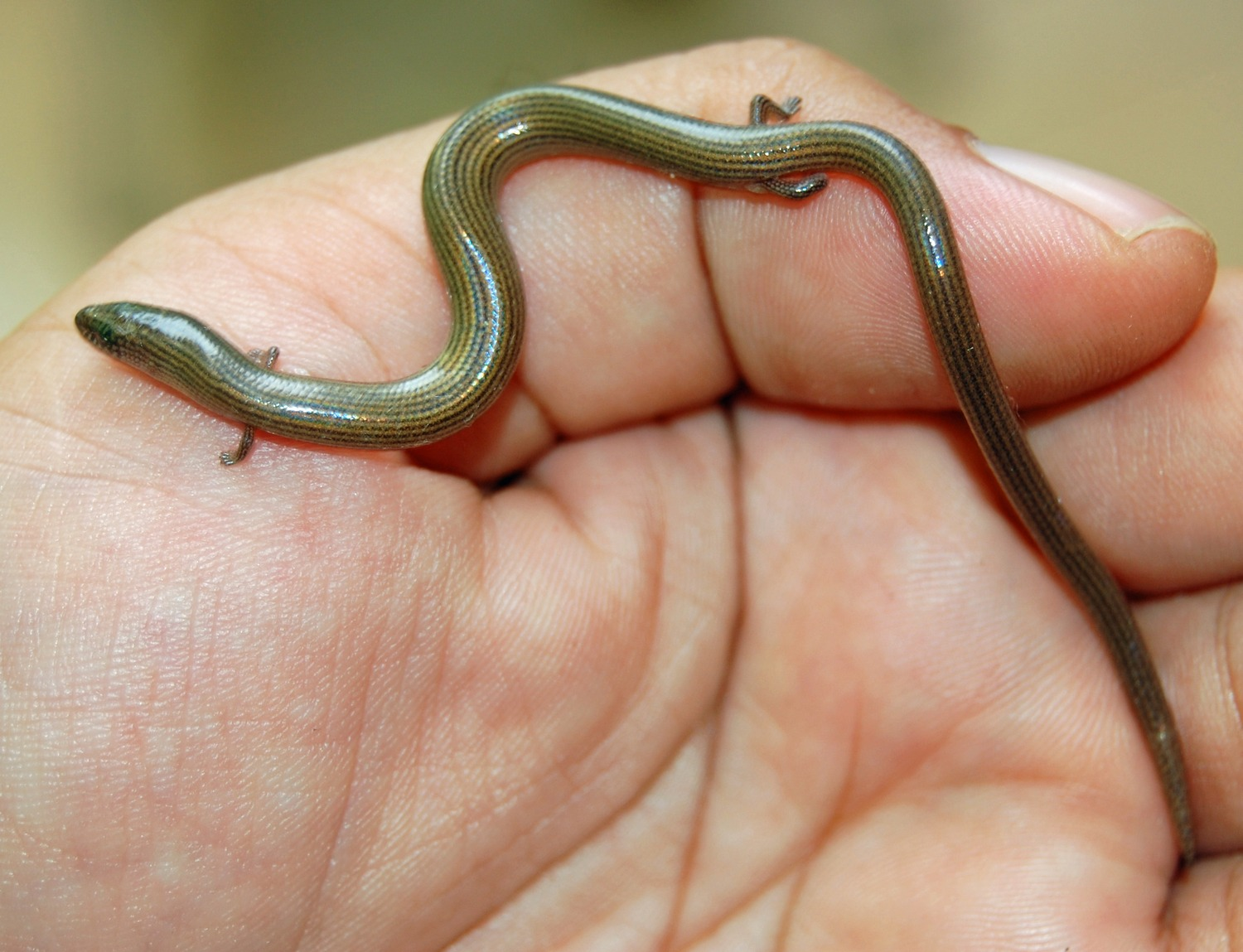
Lygosoma quadrupes

- Dasia grisea
- Dasia olivacea
- Emoia atrocostata (Lingga Islands, Siberut, Simeulue)
- Eutropis multifasciata
- Eutropis quinquecarinata
- Eutropis rudis
- Eutropis rugifera
- Larutia sumatrensis
- Lipinia relicta (Enggano, Nias, Siberut, Simeulue, Sipora)
- Lipinia vittigera (Siberut, Sipora)
- Lygosoma quadrupes
- Riopa opisthorhoda
- Riopa schneideri
- Sphenomorphus anomalopus
- Sphenomorphus cyanolaemus
- Sphenomorphus malayanus
- Sphenomorphus modiglianii (Sipora)
- Sphenomorphus sanctus
- Sphenomorphus scotophilus
- Subdoluseps bowringii
- Subdoluseps samajaya
- Tytthoscincus temmincki

==== Family Varanidae ====
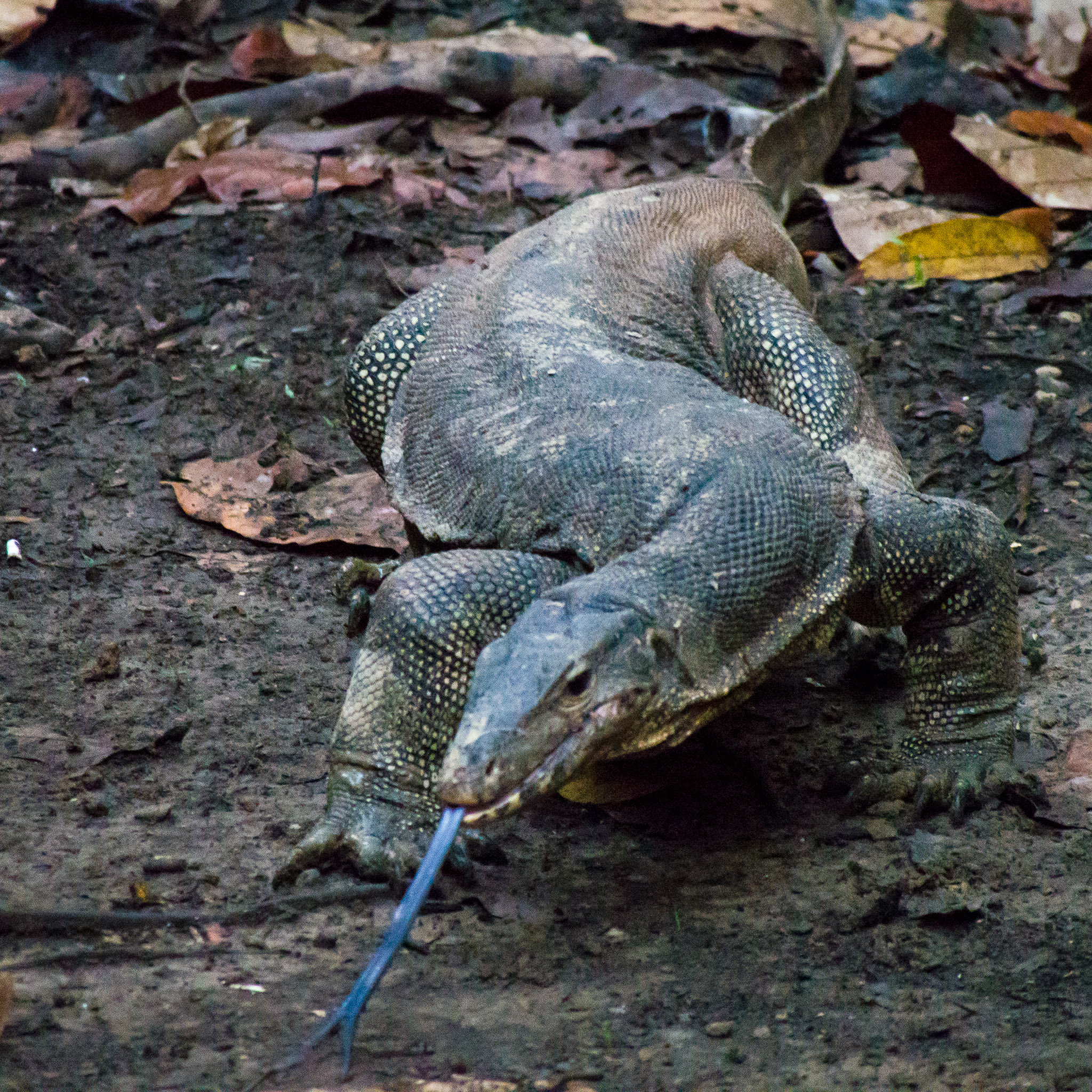
Varanus salvator

- Varanus dumerilii
- Varanus nebulosus (Lingga Islands, Riau Islands)
- Varanus rudicollis
- Varanus salvator

=== Suborder Serpentes ===
==== Family Acrochordidae ====
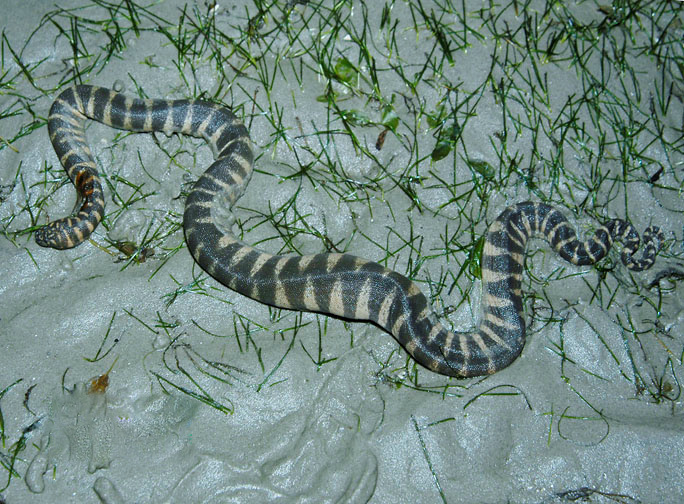
Acrochordus granulatus

- Acrochordus granulatus
- Acrochordus javanicus

==== Family Anomochilidae ====
- Anomochilus weberi

==== Family Calamariidae ====
- Calamaria abstrusa
- Calamaria albiventer
- Calamaria alidae
- Calamaria crassa
- Calamaria doederleini
- Calamaria eiselti
- Calamaria elegans (Simeulue)
- Calamaria forcarti
- Calamaria gimlettii (Riau Islands)
- Calamaria javanica (Belitung)
- Calamaria leucogaster
- Calamaria lovii (Riau Islands)
- Calamaria lumbricoidea
- Calamaria margaritophora
- Calamaria mecheli
- Calamaria modesta
- Calamaria schlegeli
- Calamaria sumatrana
- Calamaria ulmeri
- Calamaria virgulata
- Calamorhabdium sp.
- Elapoidis sumatrana
- Pseudorabdion eiselti
- Pseudorabdion longiceps
- Pseudorabdion modiglianii
- Pseudorabdion sirambense

==== Family Colubridae ====
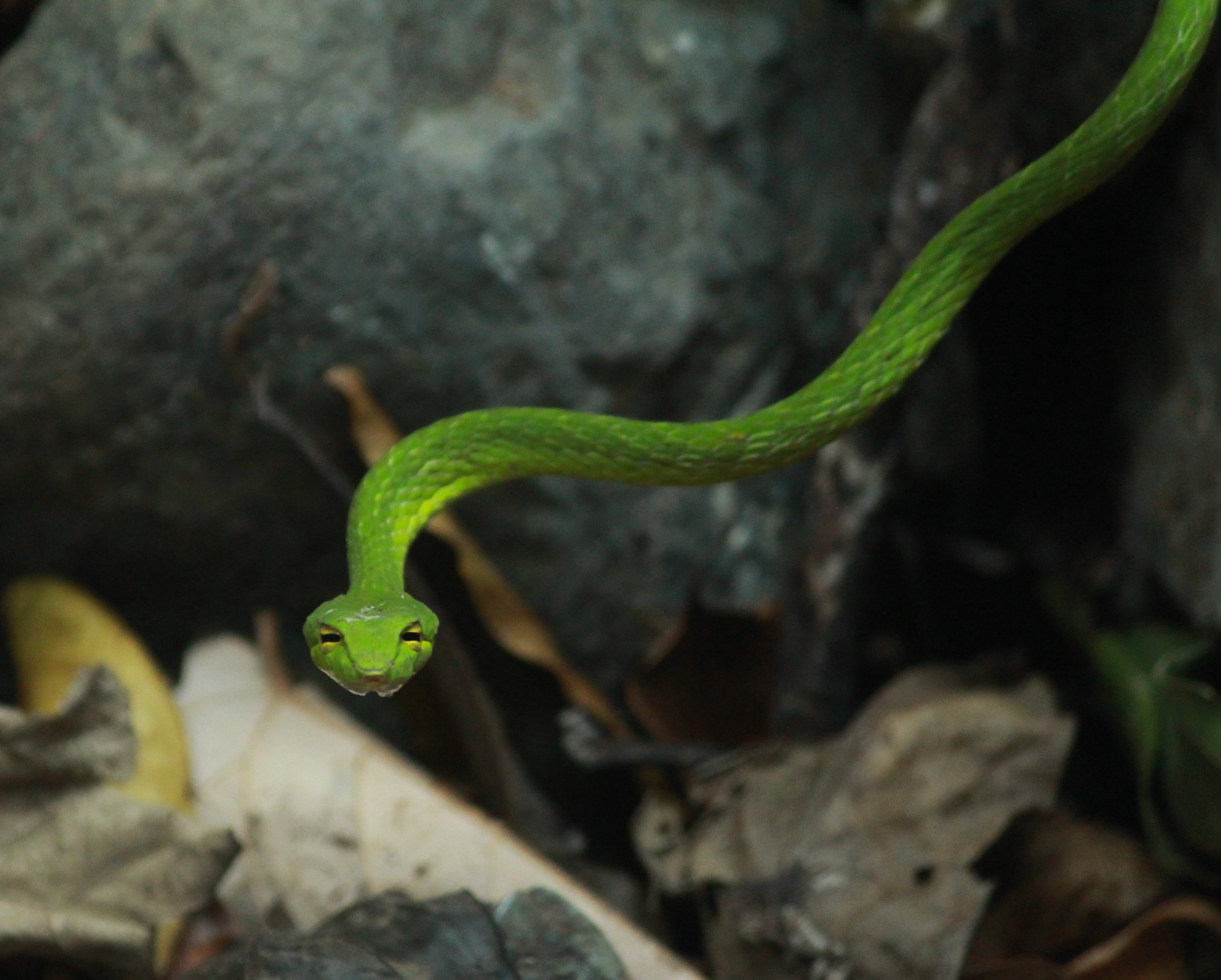
Ahaetulla prasina

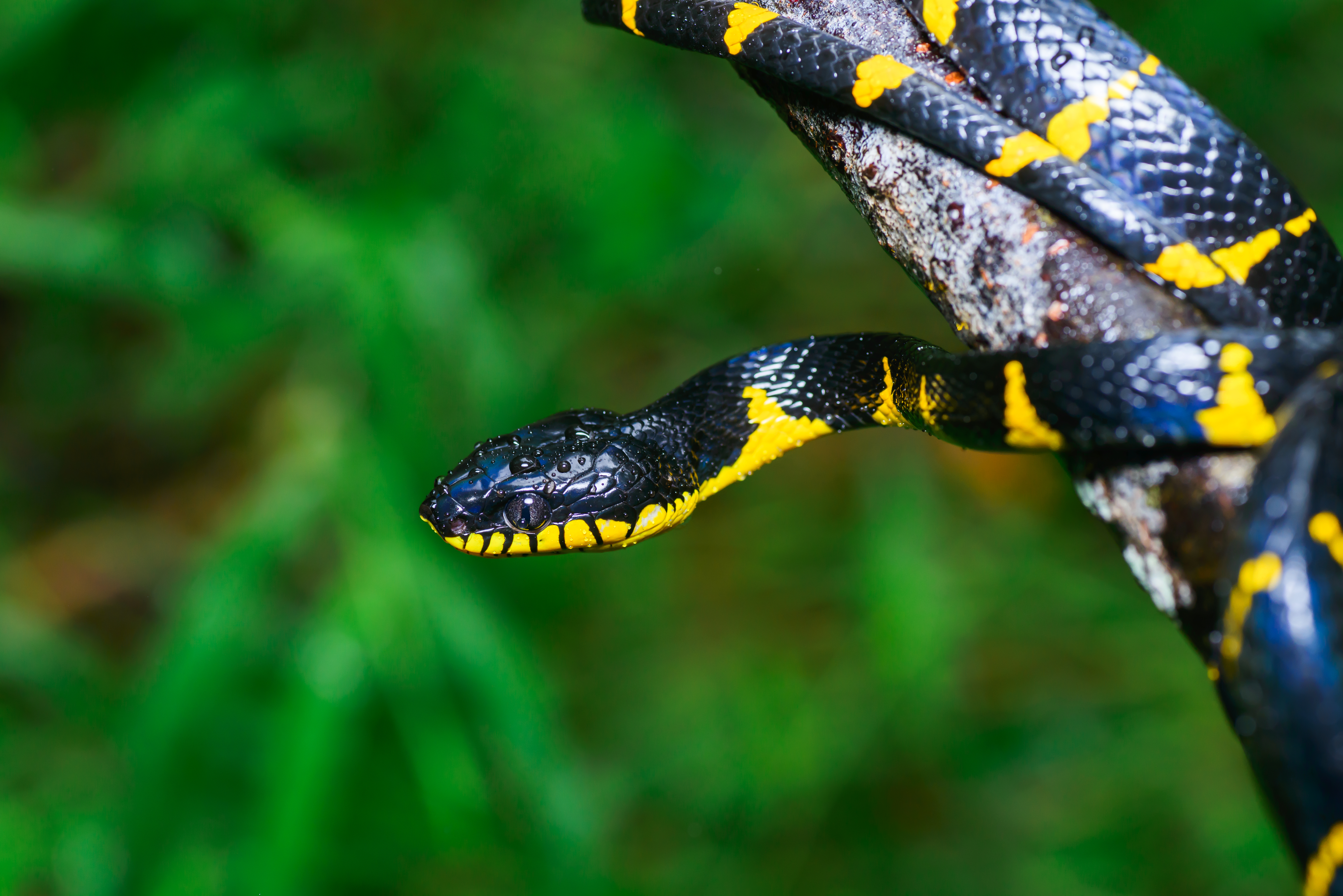
Boiga dendrophila

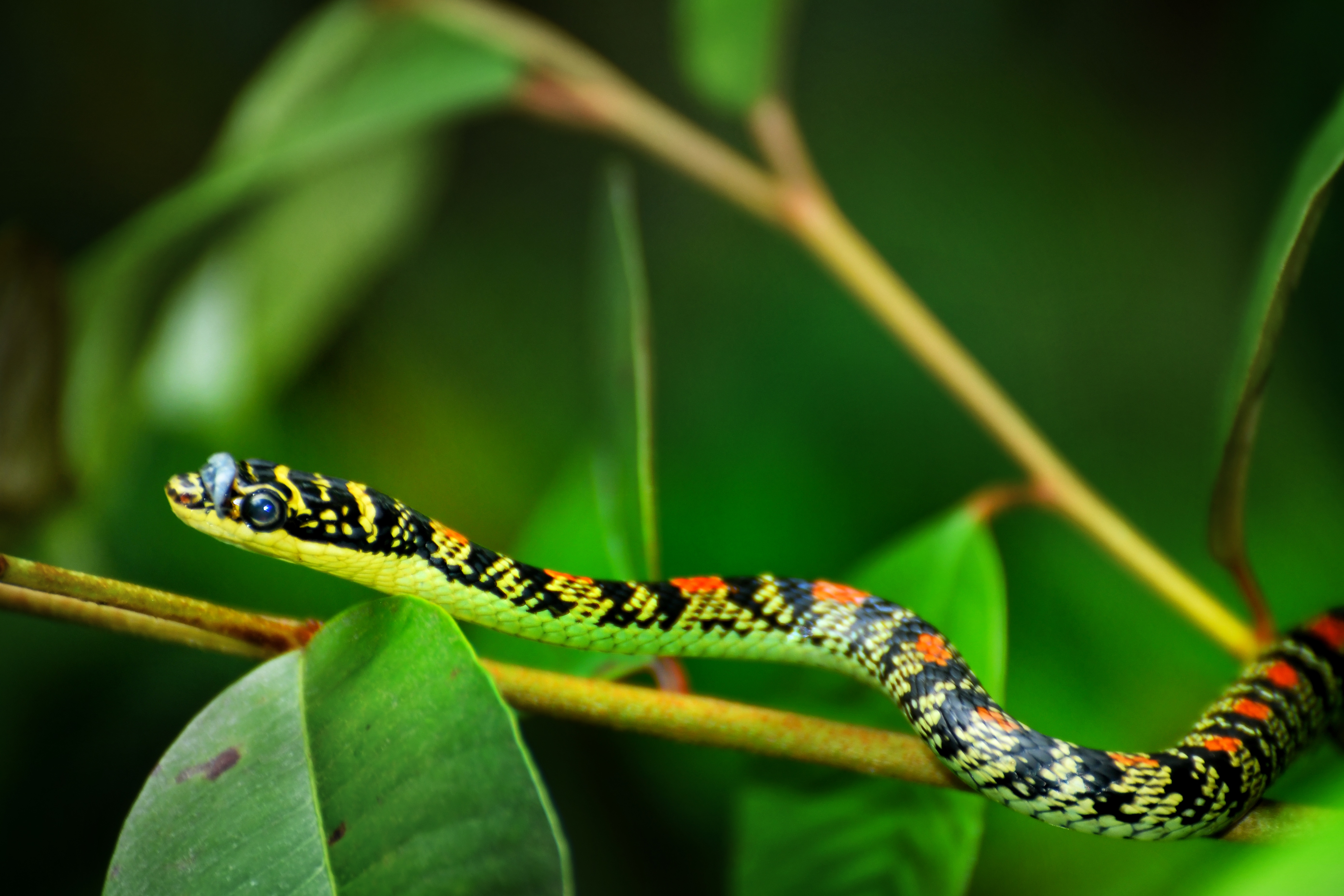
Chrysopelea ornata

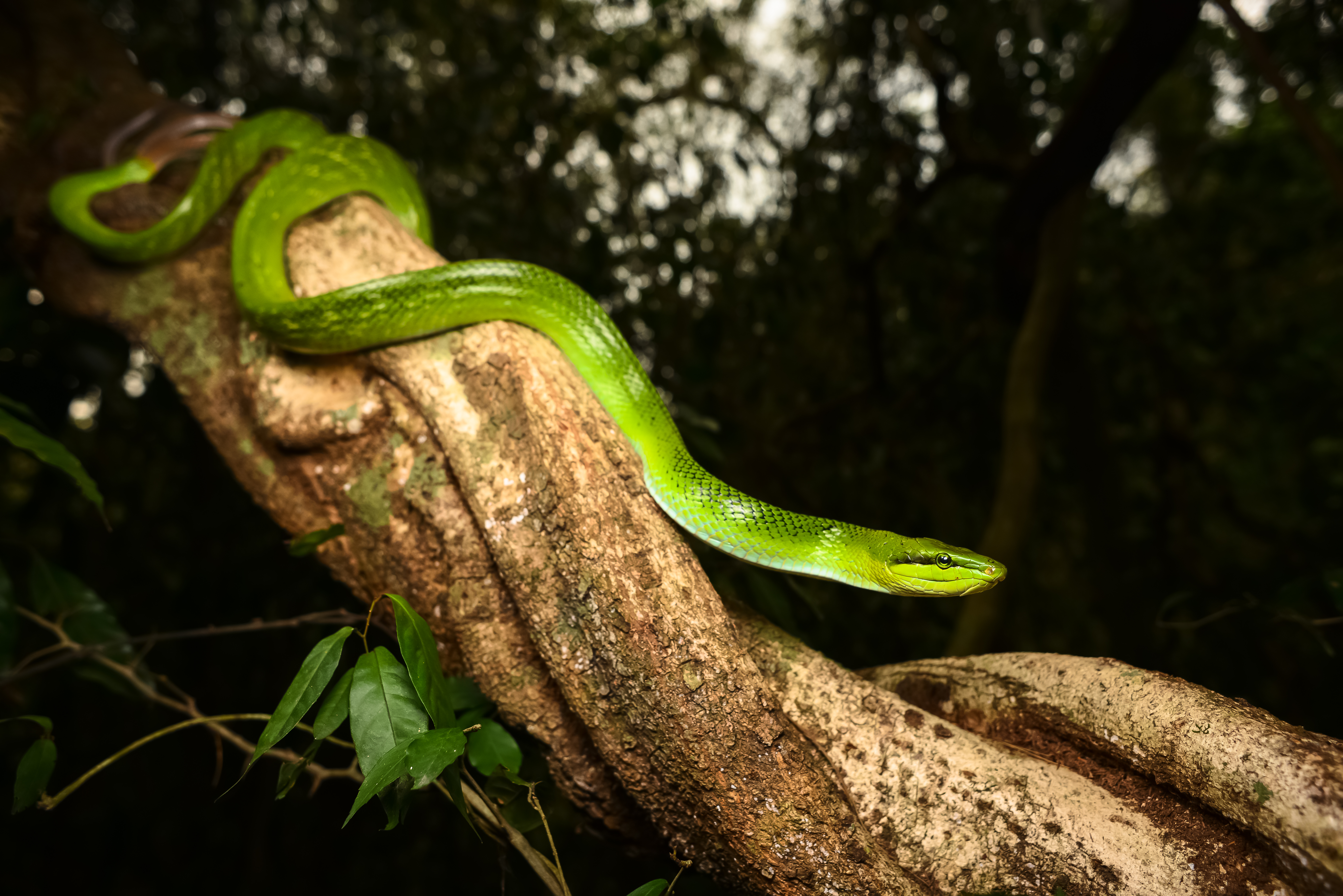
Gonyosoma oxycephalum

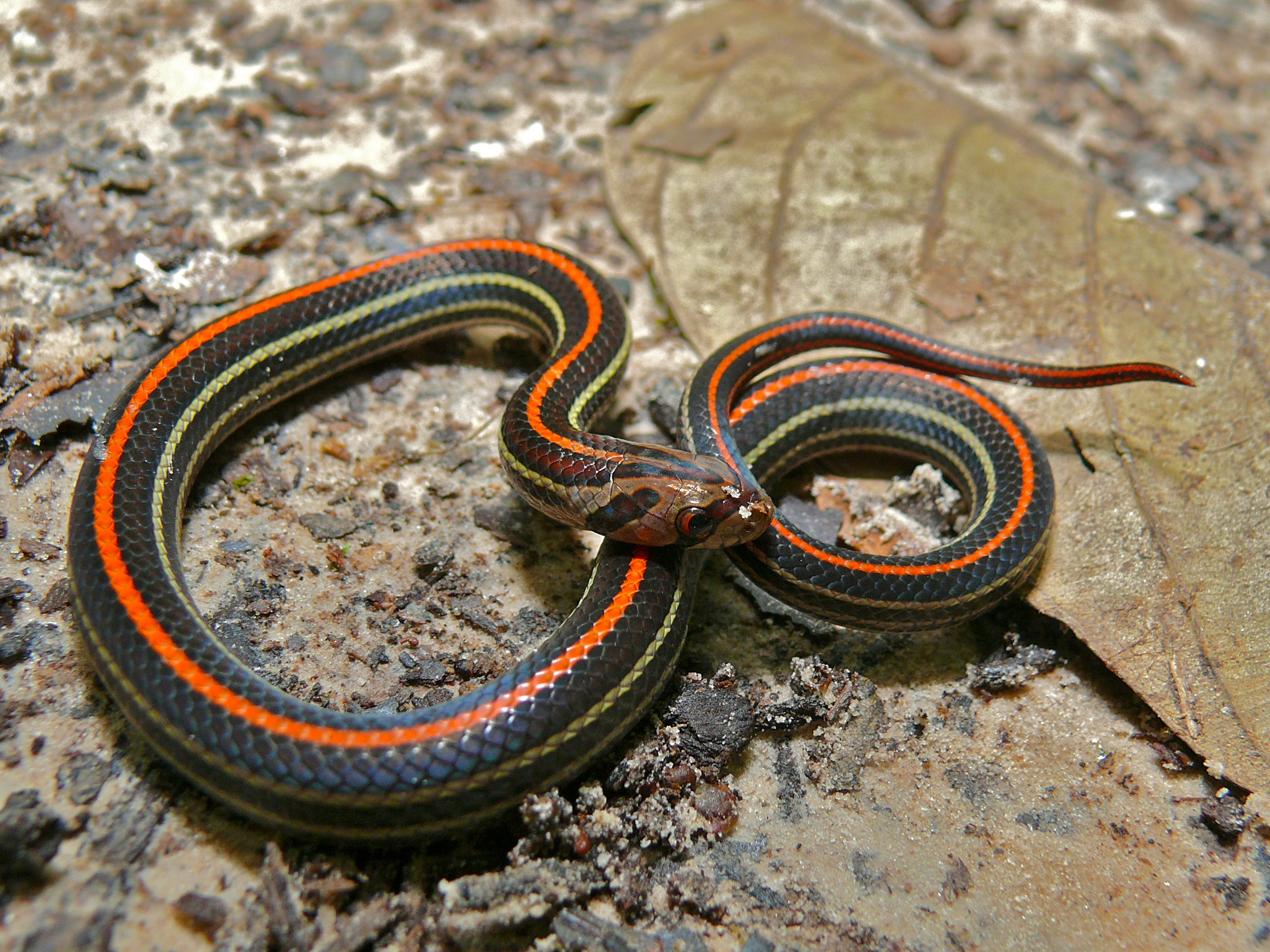
Oligodon octolineatus

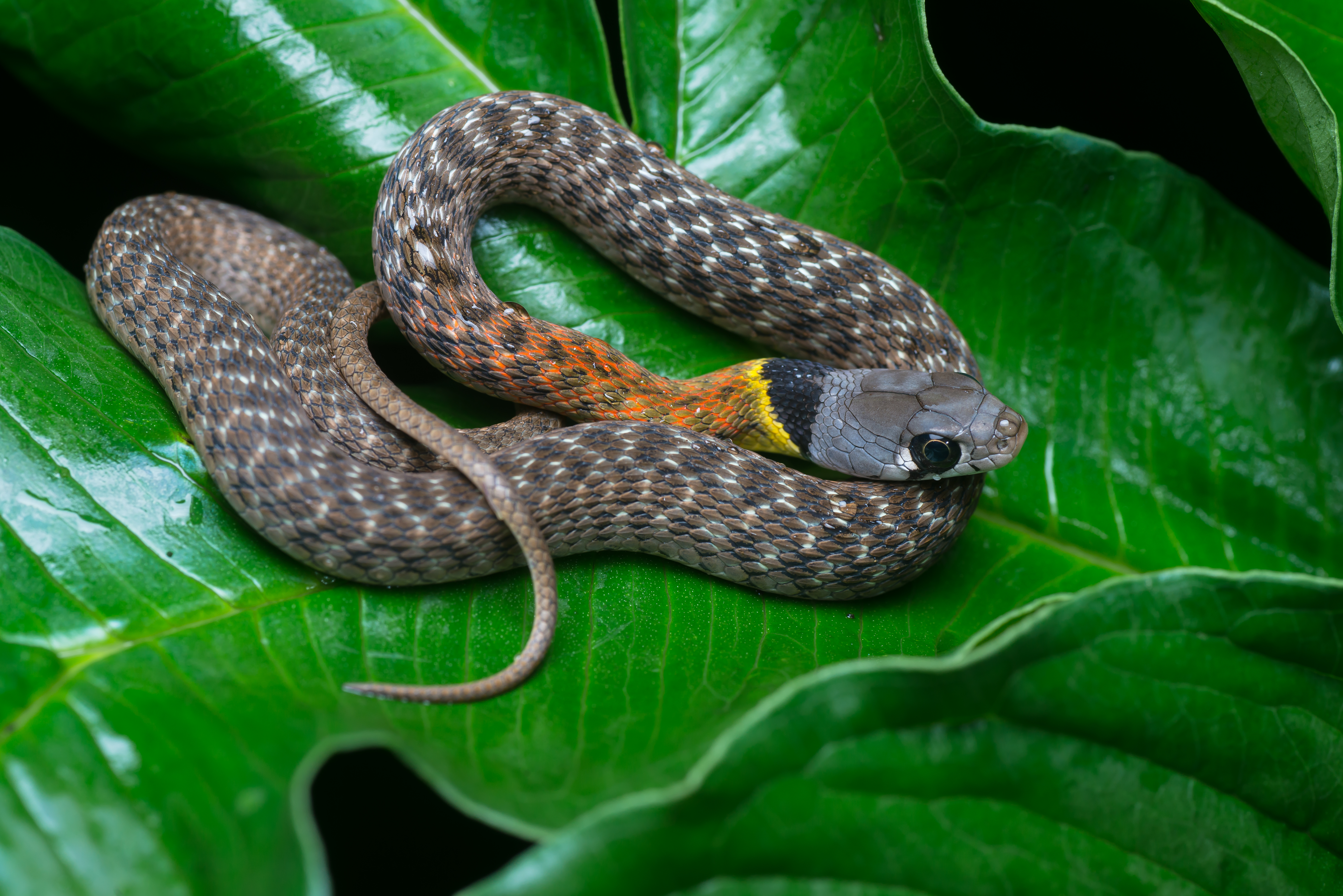
Rhabdophis subminiatus

- Ahaetulla fasciolata
- Ahaetulla mycterizans
- Ahaetulla prasina
- Anoplohydrus aemulans
- Boiga bengkuluensis
- Boiga cynodon
- Boiga drapiezii
- Boiga jaspidea
- Boiga melanota
- Boiga multomaculata
- Boiga nigriceps
- Ceratophallus vittatus
- Chrysopelea paradisi
- Chrysopelea pelias
- Coelognathus enganensis (Enggano)
- Coelognathus flavolineatus
- Coelognathus radiatus
- Dendrelaphis caudolineatus
- Dendrelaphis formosus
- Dendrelaphis haasi
- Dendrelaphis kopsteini
- Dendrelaphis pictus
- Dendrelaphis striatus
- Dryophiops rubescens
- Elaphe taeniura
- Gongylosoma baliodeirus
- Gongylosoma longicaudum
- Gonyosoma oxycephalum
- Liopeltis tricolor
- Lycodon albofuscus
- Lycodon capucinus
- Lycodon effraenis
- Lycodon sidiki
- Lycodon subannulatus
- Lycodon subcinctus
- Oligodon bitorquatus
- Oligodon octolineatus
- Oligodon petronellae
- Oligodon praefrontalis (Weh)
- Oligodon pulcherrimus
- Oligodon purpurascens
- Oligodon signatus
- Oligodon trilineatus
- Oligodon wagneri (Nias)
- Oreocryptophis porphyraceus
- Ptyas carinata
- Ptyas fusca
- Ptyas korros
- Ptyas mucosa
- Xenelaphis ellipsifer
- Xenelaphis hexagonotus

==== Family Cylindrophiidae ====
- Cylindrophis ruffus

==== Family Elapidae ====
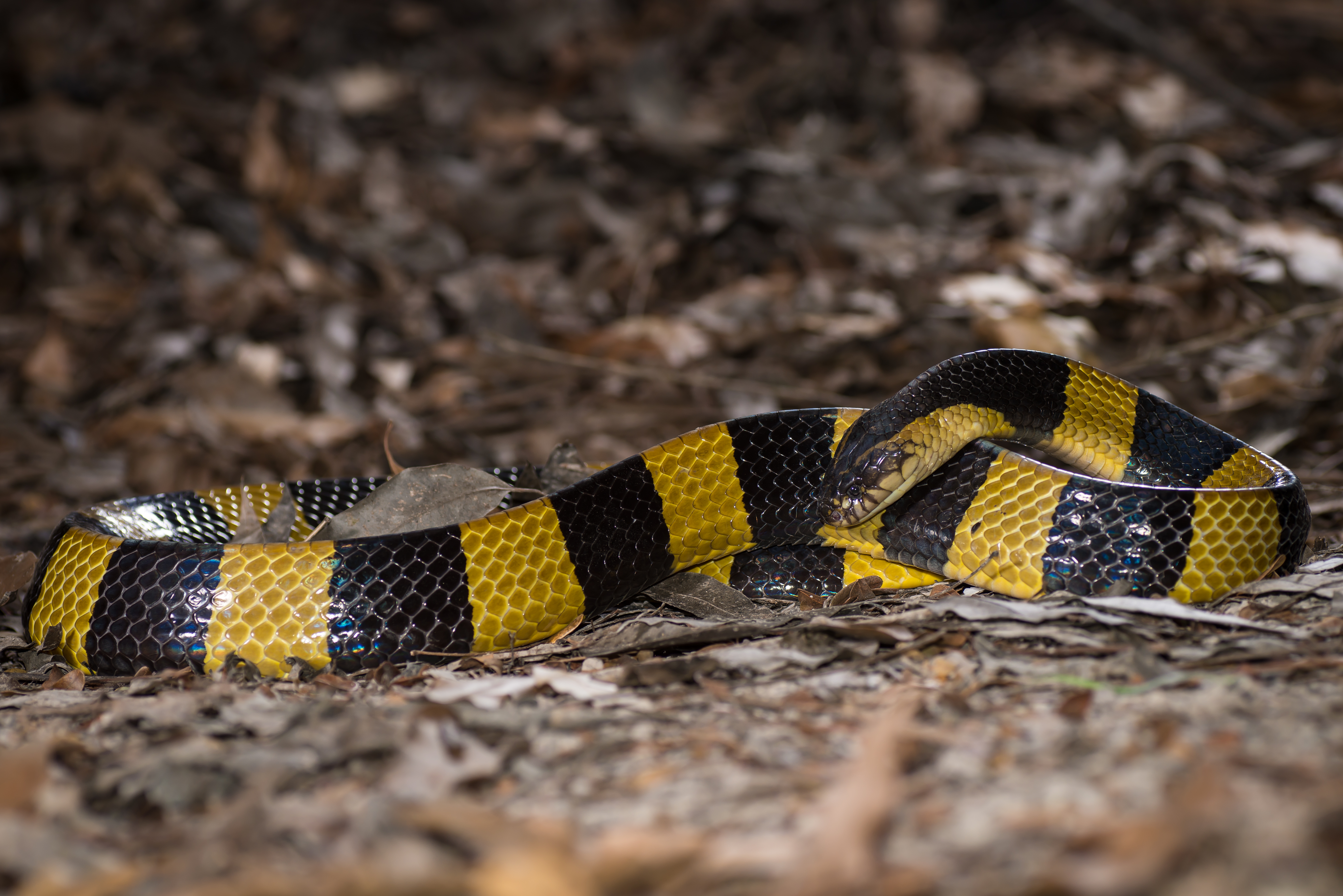
Bungarus fasciatus

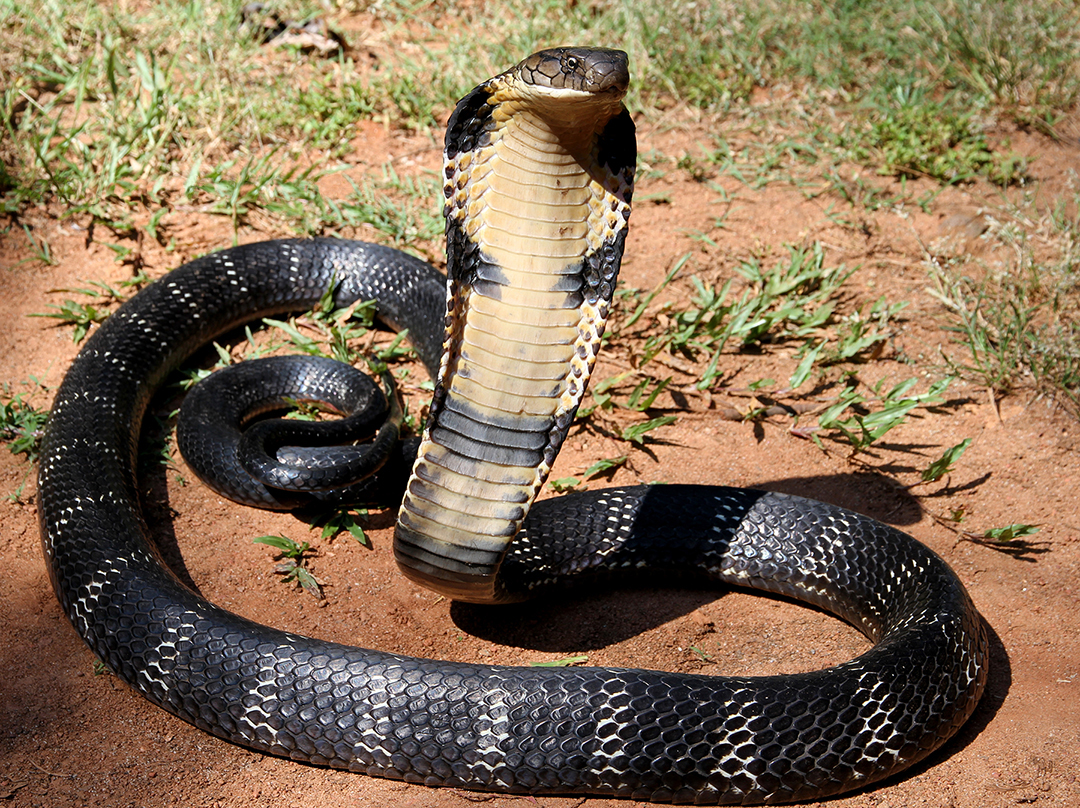
Ophiophagus hannah

- Bungarus candidus
- Bungarus fasciatus
- Bungarus flaviceps
- Calliophis bivirgatus
- Calliophis gracilis
- Calliophis intestinalis
- Calliophis nigrotaeniatus
- Naja sputatrix (Bangka, Belitung, Riau Islands)
- Naja sumatrana
- Ophiophagus bungarus

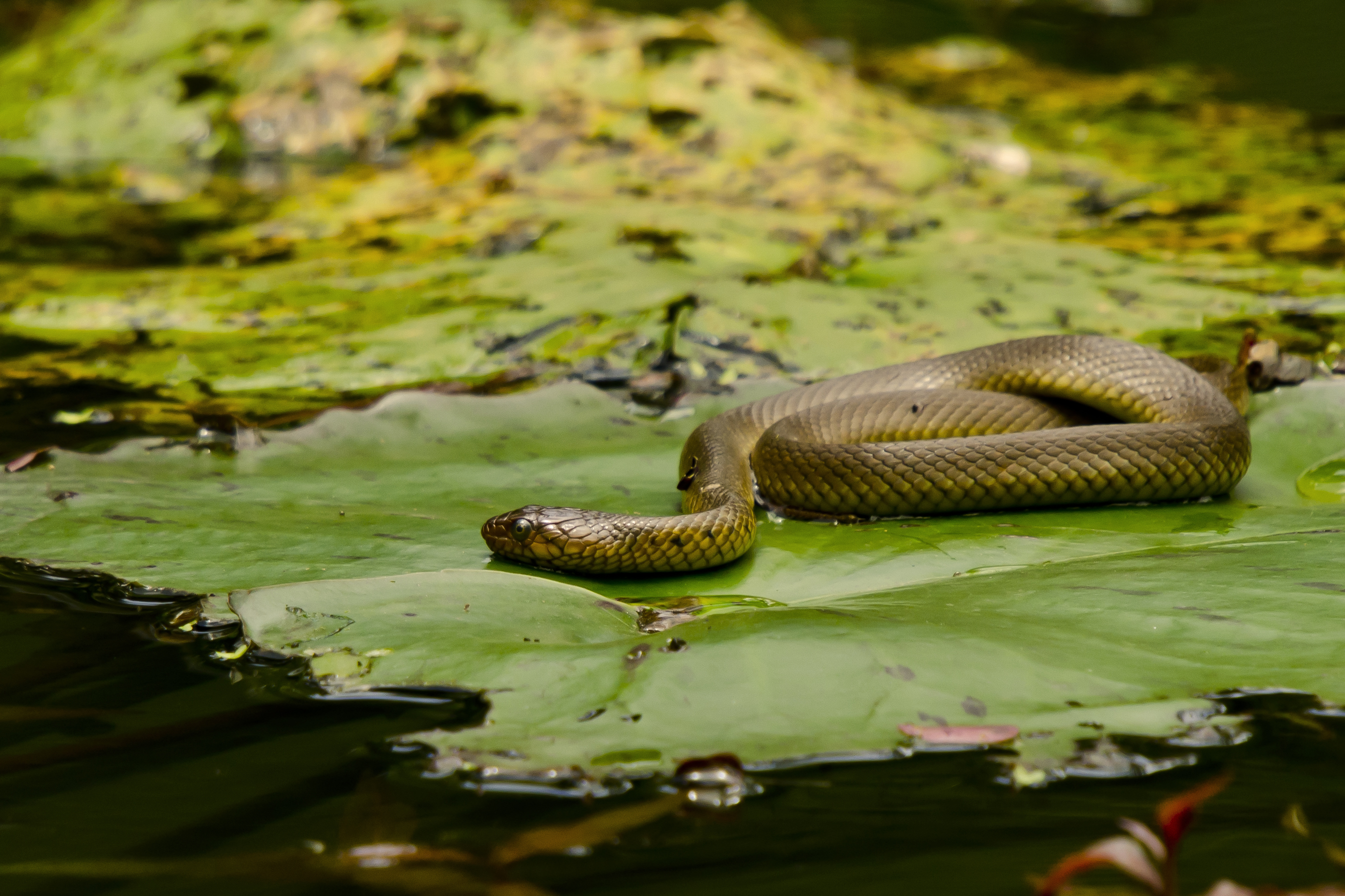
Enhydris enhydris

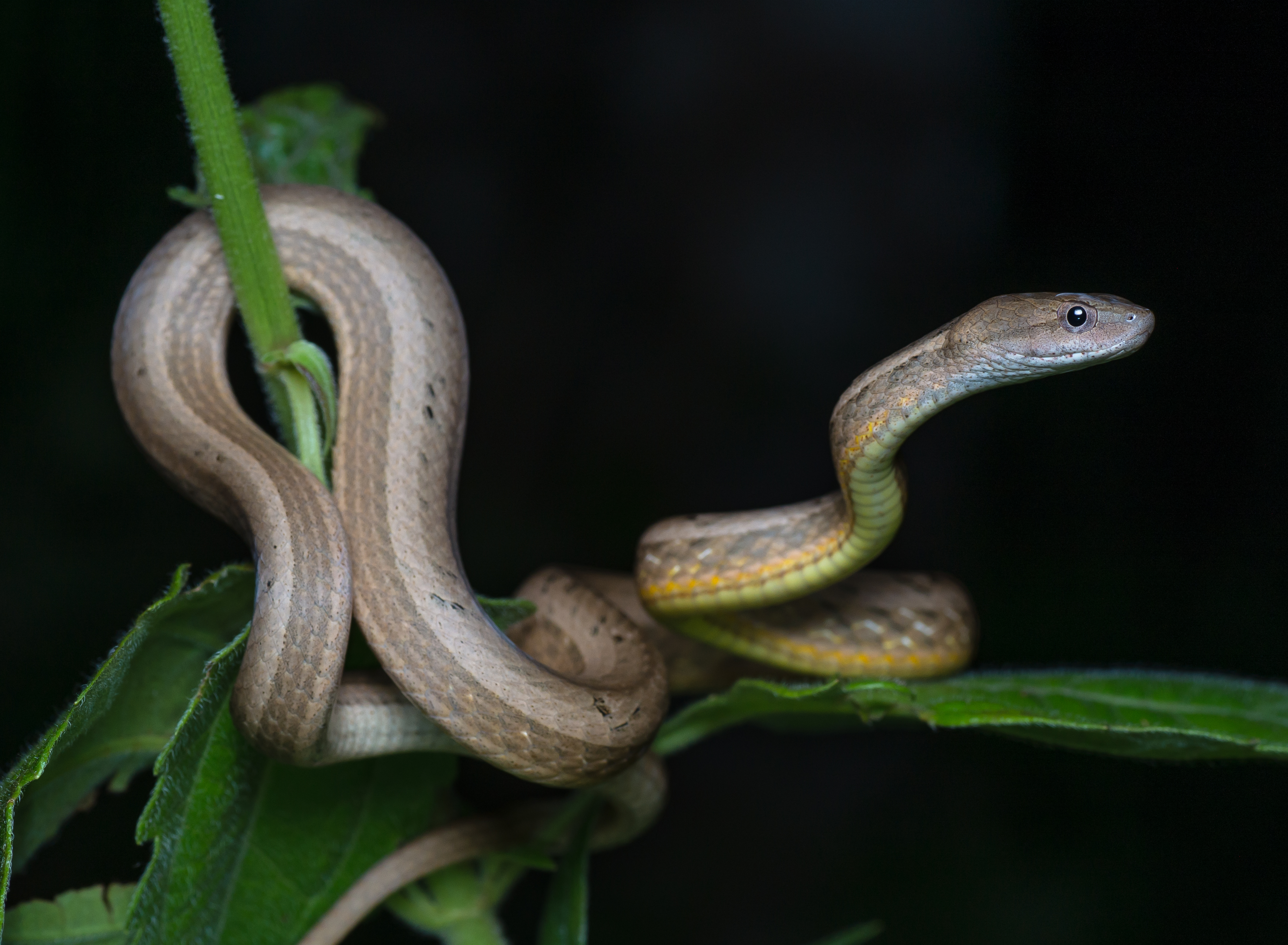
Psammodynastes pulverulentus

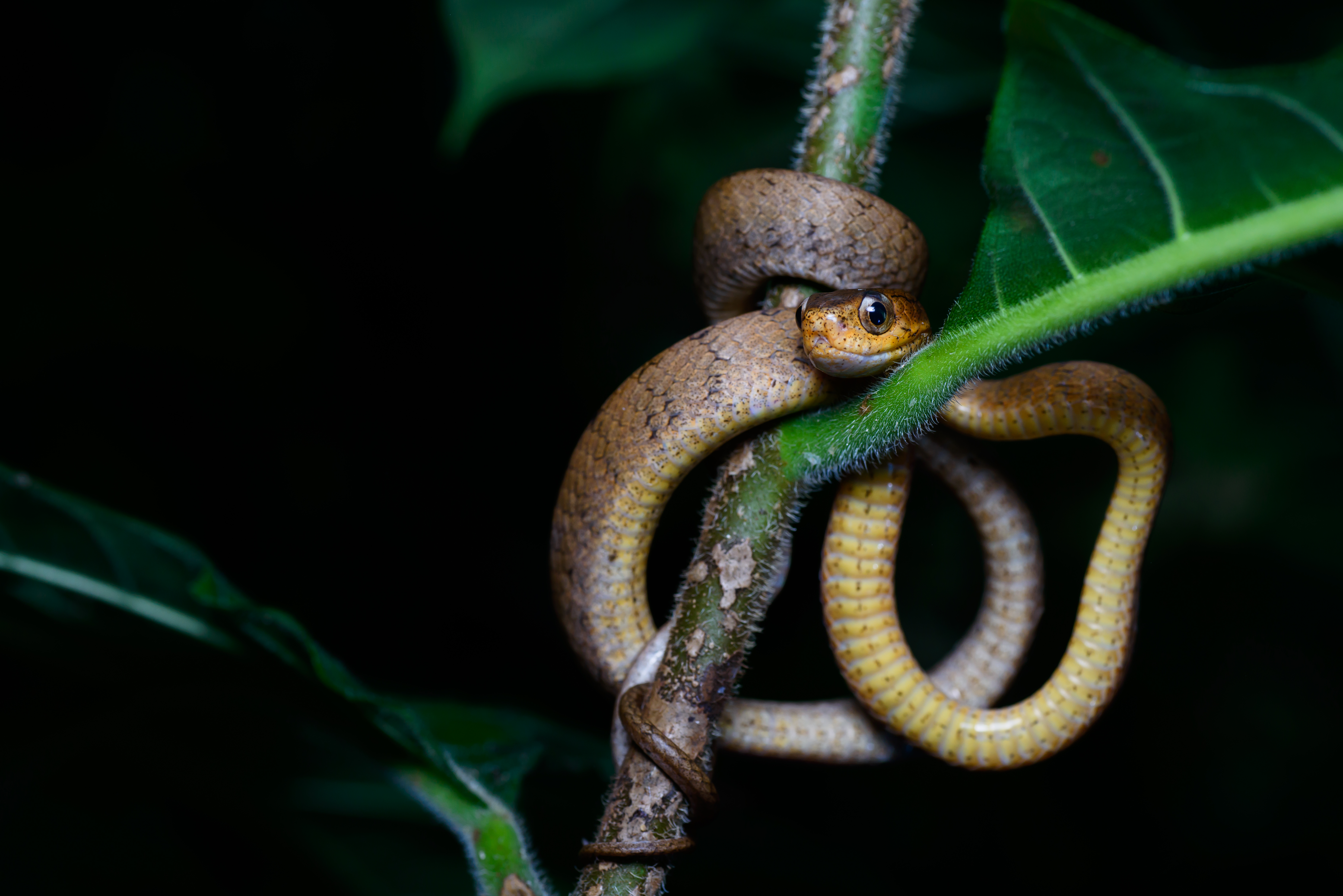
Pareas carinatus

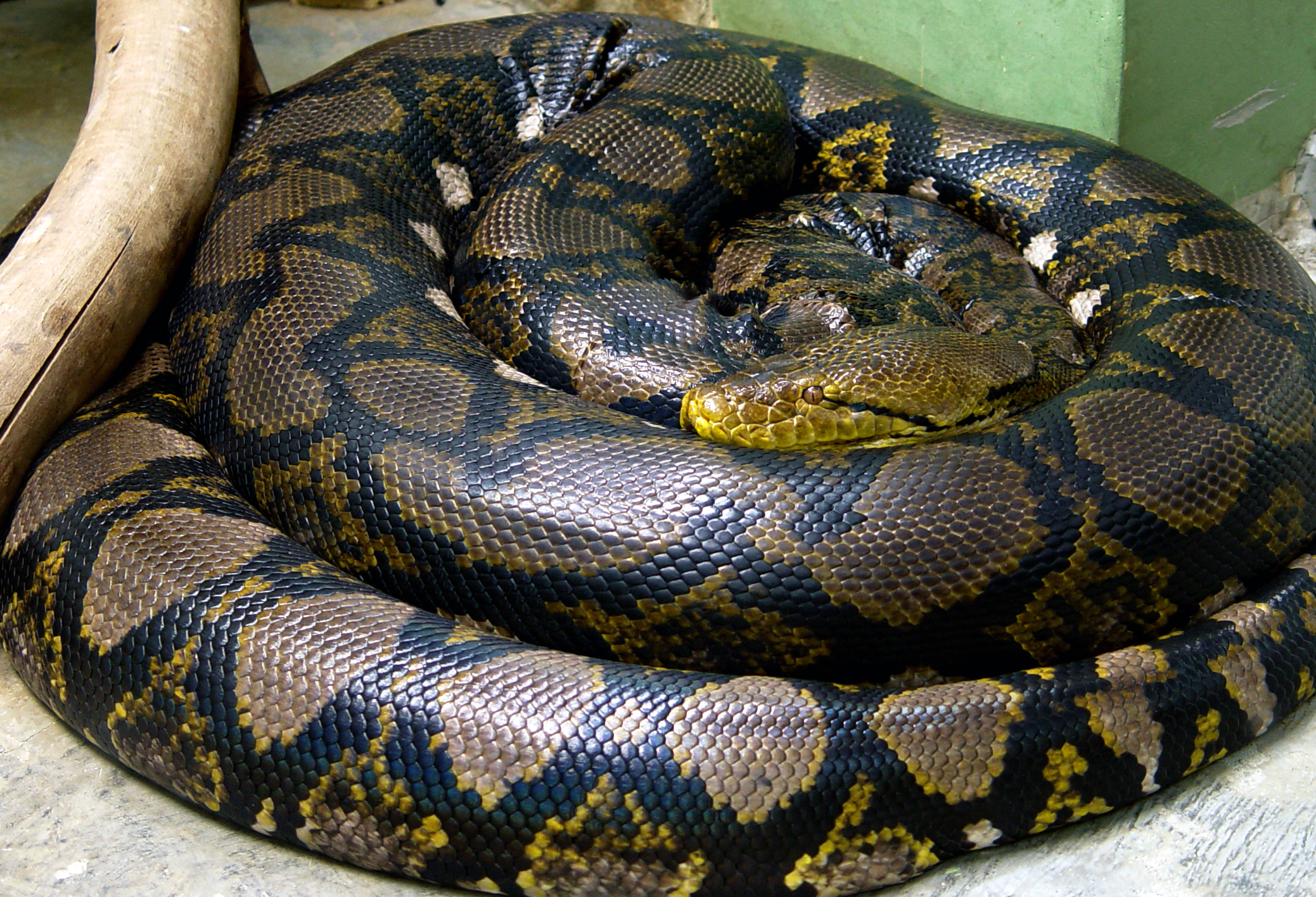
Python reticulatus

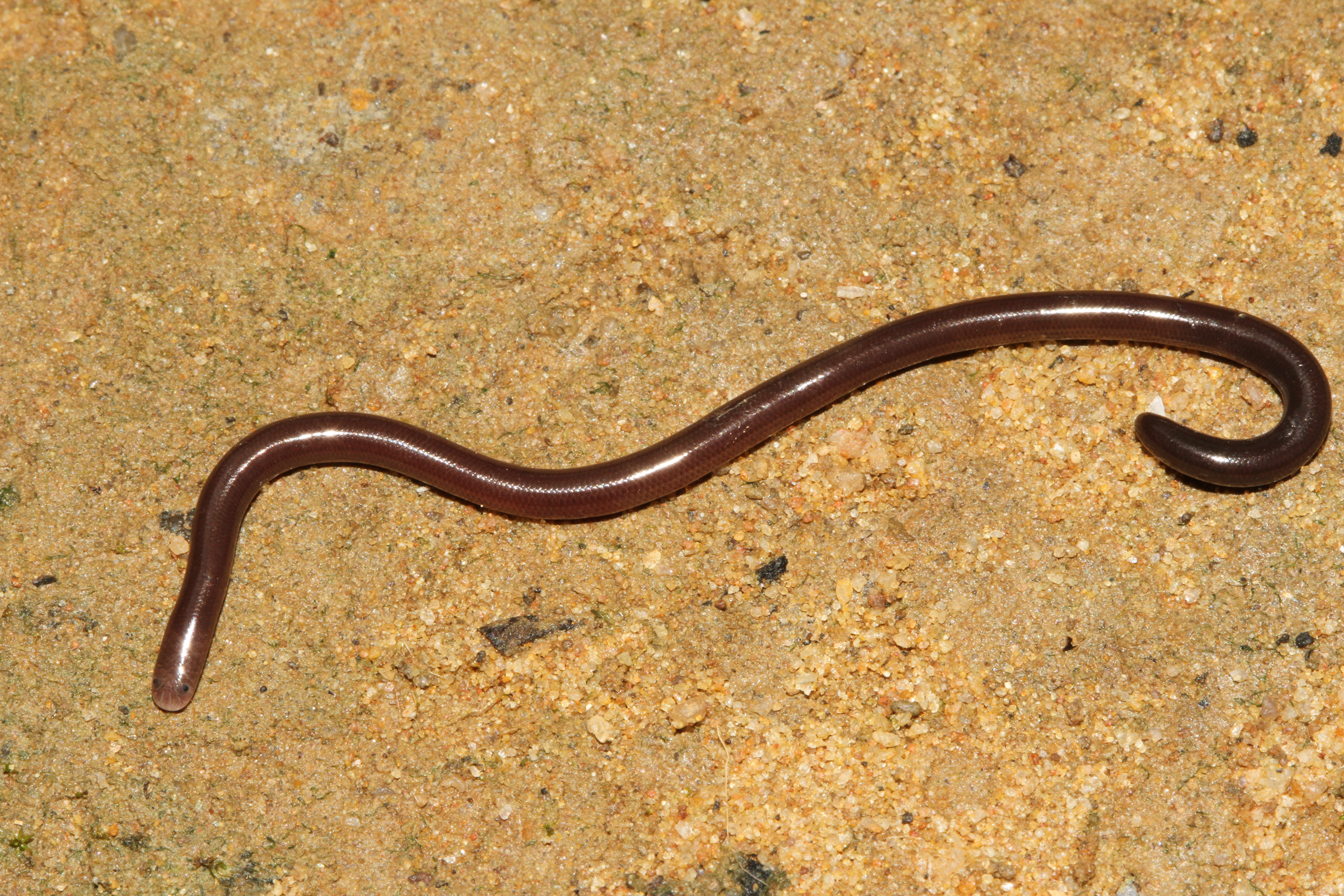
Indotyphlops braminus

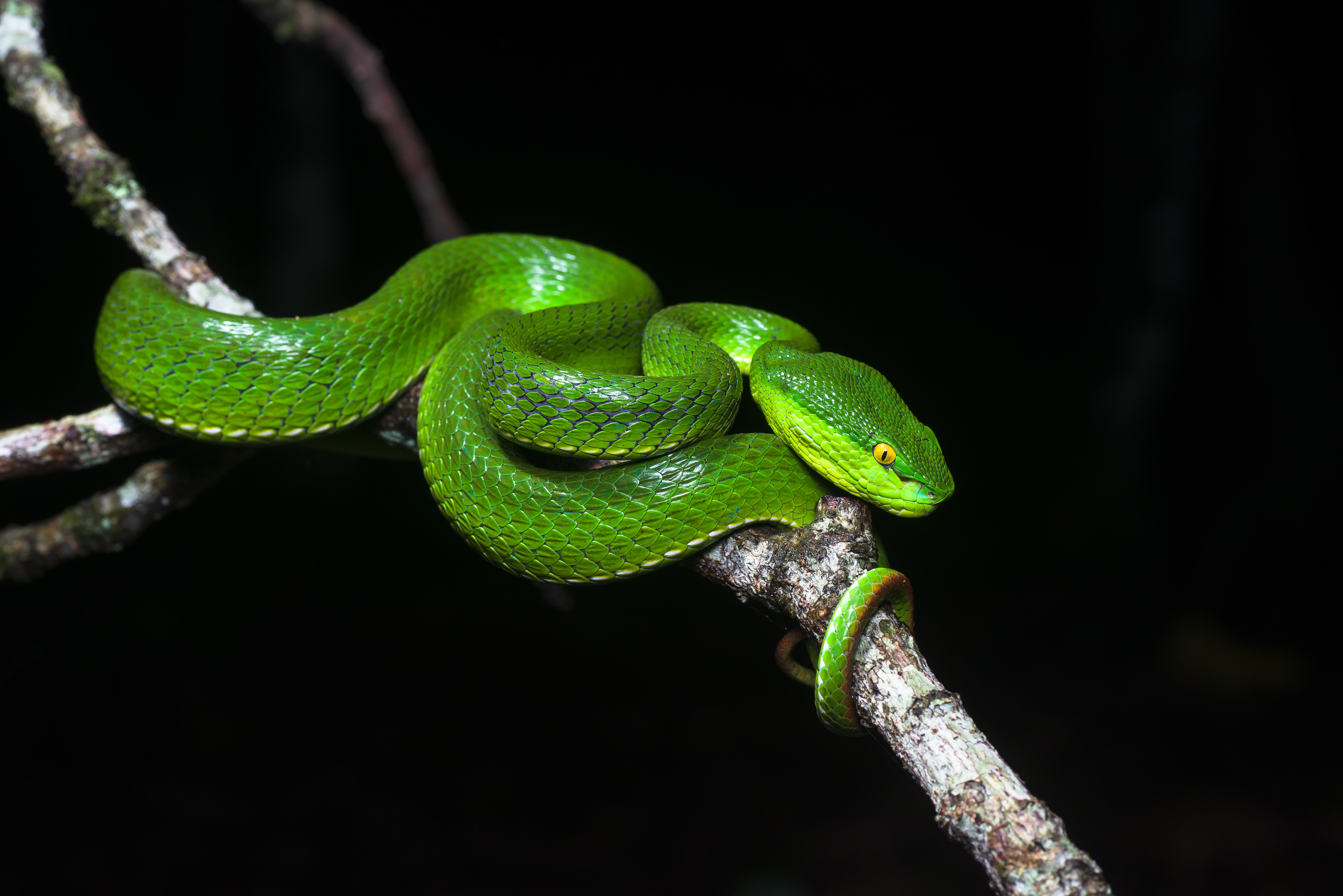
Trimeresurus albolabris

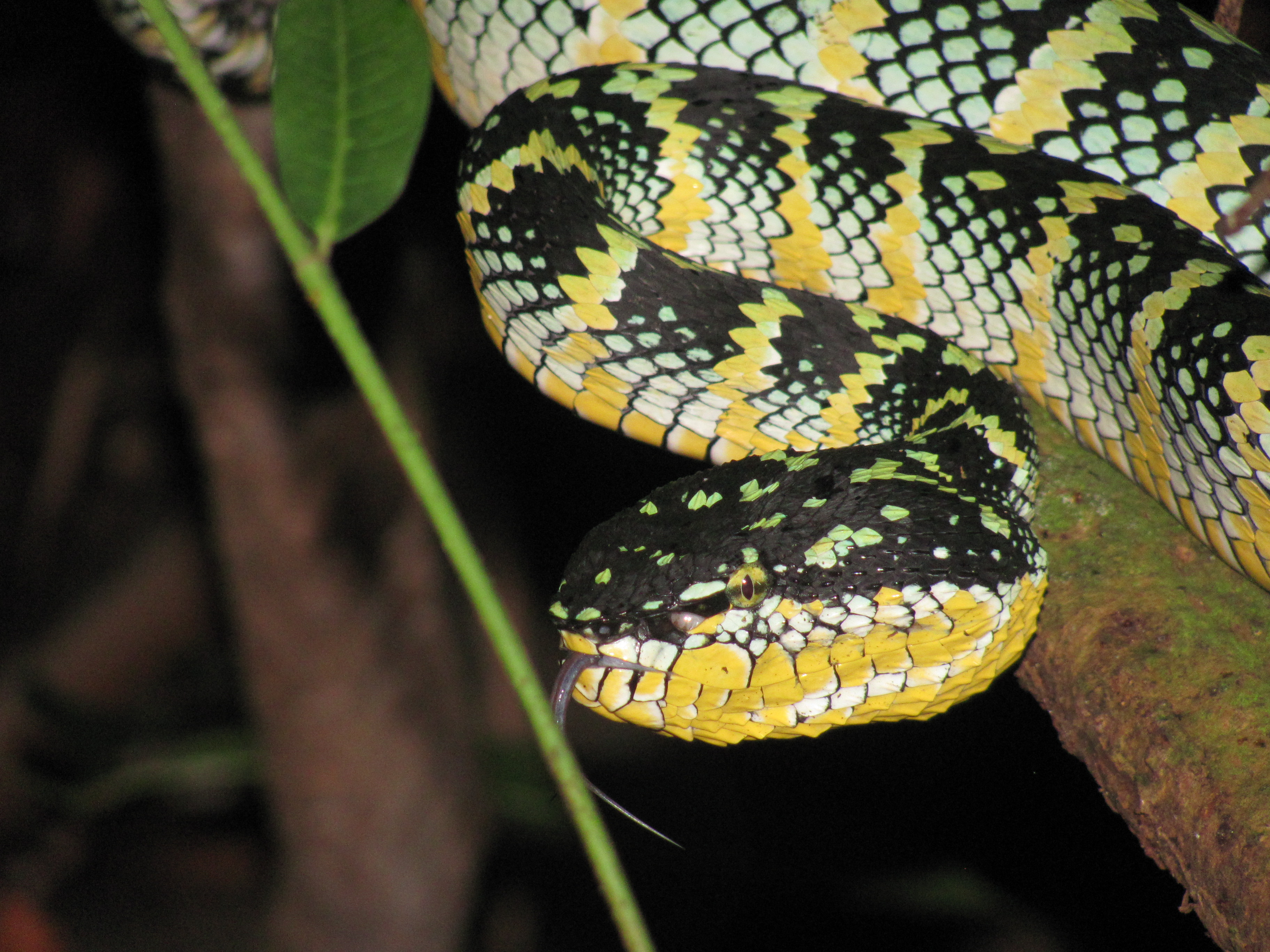
Tropidolaemus wagleri

==== Family Gerrhopilidae ====
- Gerrhopilus sumatranus

==== Family Homalopsidae ====
- Cerberus schneiderii
- Enhydris enhydris
- Fordonia leucobalia
- Homalopsis buccata
- Hypsiscopus plumbea
- Karnsophis siantaris
- Miralia alternans
- Phytolopsis punctata
- Sumatranus albomaculatus (Nias, Simeulue)

==== Family Natricidae ====
- Etheridgeum pulchrum
- Fowlea melanzosta
- Hebius kerinciense
- Hebius petersii
- Hebius viperinus
- Iguanognathus werneri
- Opisthotropis rugosa
- Rhabdophis akraios
- Rhabdophis chrysargos
- Rhabdophis conspicillatus
- Rhabdophis flaviceps
- Rhabdophis rhodomelas
- Rhabdophis subminiatus
- Xenochrophis maculatus
- Xenochrophis trianguligerus

==== Family Pareidae ====
- Aplopeltura boa
- Asthenodipsas laevis
- Asthenodipsas malaccanus
- Asthenodipsas tropidonotus
- Pareas carinatus
- Pareas margaritophorus
- Pareas nuchalis

==== Family Psammodynastidae ====
- Psammodynastes pictus
- Psammodynastes pulverulentus

==== Family Pseudoxenodontidae ====
- Pseudoxenodon jacobsonii

==== Family Pythonidae ====
- Malayopython reticulatus
- Python brongersmai
- Python curtus

==== Family Sibynophiidae ====
- Sibynophis geminatus
- Sibynophis melanocephalus

==== Family Typhlopidae ====
- Argyrophis hypsobothrius
- Argyrophis muelleri
- Ramphotyphlops lineatus
- Virgotyphlops braminus

==== Family Viperidae ====
- Craspedocephalus andalasensis
- Craspedocephalus brongersmai (Siberut, Simeulue)
- Craspedocephalus puniceus
- Ovophis convictus
- Parias calamitas (Nias)
- Parias gunaleni
- Parias hageni
- Parias kirscheyi (Simeulue)
- Parias sumatranus
- Parias whitteni (Siberut)
- Popeia sabahi
- Trimeresurus albolabris
- Trimeresurus purpureomaculatus
- Tropidolaemus subannulatus (Belitung)
- Tropidolaemus wagleri

==== Family Xenodermidae ====
- Xenodermus javanicus

==== Family Xenopeltidae ====
- Xenopeltis unicolor

==== Family Xenophidiidae ====
- Xenophidion sp.
