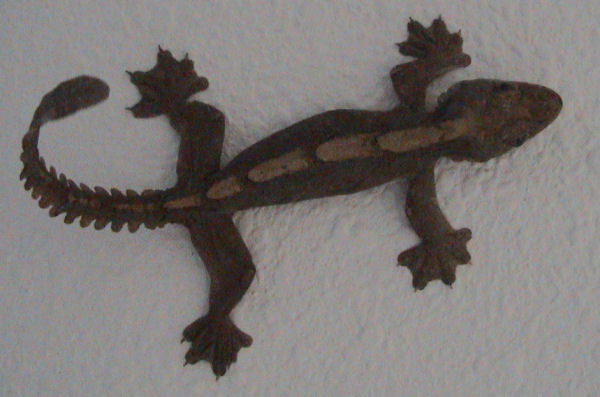
- Ptychozoon kuhli

Scientific classification
- Kingdom: Animalia
- Phylum: Chordata
- Class: Reptilia
- Order: Squamata
- Suborder: Gekkota
- Family: Gekkonidae
- Subfamily: Gekkoninae
- Genus: Ptychozoon; Kuhl & van Hasselt, 1822

= Ptychozoon =

Genus of lizards

Ptychozoon was a genus of arboreal geckos, endemic to Southeast Asia, known commonly as flying geckos, gliding geckos, or parachute geckos. They all are now placed in the genus Gekko in the family Gekkonidae. The biogeographic history of the genus Ptychozoon was deeply nested within that of the genus Gekko, the center of diversity of which is within Southeast Asia. Since dispersing into Southeast Asian rainforests, Pytochozoon, like other forest-dwelling vertebrates, adapted to facilitate gliding. All species in the genus Ptychozoon are characterized by cryptic coloration and elaborate webs surrounding the neck, limbs, trunk, and tail. These membranes help to conceal the gecko against trees. When the gecko leaps into the air, the flaps are used to generate lift and allow the gecko to control its fall. It can glide up to 200 feet (61 meters). Also it does a swoop at the end of its glide to land softly. A similar adaptation is found in geckos of the genus Cosymbotus. There were thirteen described species in the genus Ptychozoon.

== Species ==
The following species were recognized as being valid.

- Ptychozoon bannaense Y. Wang, J. Wang & Liu, 2016 – Banna parachute gecko
- Ptychozoon cicakterbang Grismer, Wood, Grismer, Quah, Thy, Phimmachak, Sivongxay, Seateun, Stuart, Siler, Mulcahy, Anamza, & Brown, 2019 – Malaysia parachute gecko
- Ptychozoon horsfieldii (Gray, 1827) – Horsfield's flying gecko, Horsfield's parachute gecko
- Ptychozoon intermedium Taylor, 1915 – intermediate flying gecko, Philippine parachute gecko
- Ptychozoon kabkaebin Grismer, Wood, Grismer, Quah, Thy, Phimmachak, Sivongxay, Seateun, Stuart, Siler, Mulcahy, Anamza, & Brown, 2019 – Lao parachute gecko
- Ptychozoon kaengkrachanense Sumontha, Pauwels, Kunya, Limlikhitaksorn, Ruksue, Taokratok, Ansermet & Chanhome, 2012 – Kaeng Krachan parachute gecko
- Ptychozoon kuhli Stejneger, 1902 – Kuhl's flying gecko, Kuhl's parachute gecko
- Ptychozoon lionotum Annandale, 1905 – smooth-backed gliding gecko, smooth-backed flying gecko, Burmese flying gecko, Burmese parachute gecko
- Ptychozoon nicobarensis Das & Vijayakumar, 2009 – Nicobar gliding gecko
- Ptychozoon popaense Grismer, Wood, Thura, M. Grismer, Brown, & Stuart, 2018 – Mt. Popa parachute gecko
- Ptychozoon rhacophorus (Boulenger, 1899) – Sabah flying gecko
- Ptychozoon tokehos Grismer, Wood, Grismer, Quah, Thy, Phimmachak, Sivongxay, Seateun, Stuart, Siler, Mulcahy, Anamza, & Brown, 2019 – Cambodian parachute gecko
- Ptychozoon trinotaterra R.M. Brown, 1999

Nota bene: A binomial authority in parentheses indicates that the species was originally described in a genus other than Ptychozoon.
