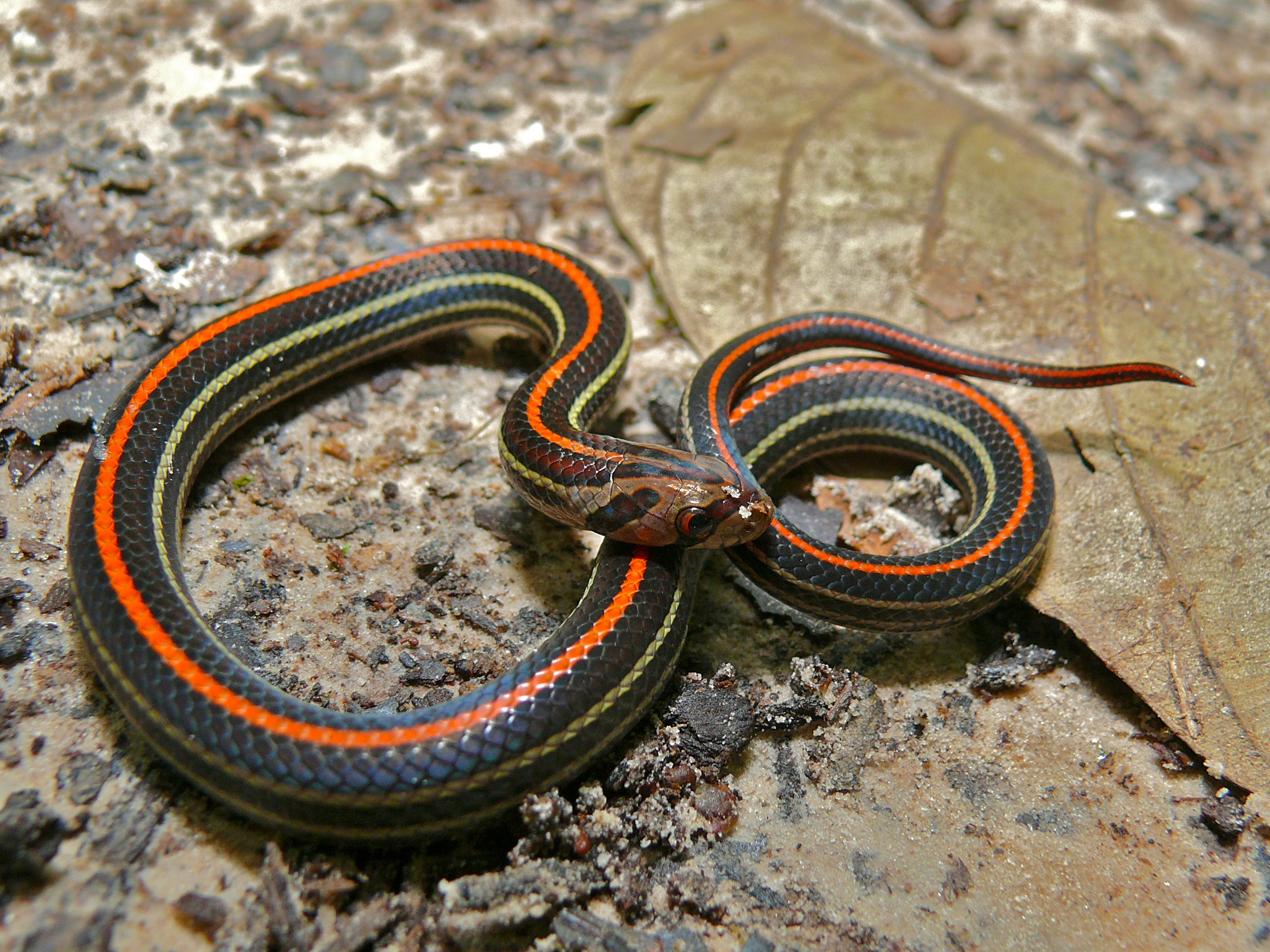

Conservation status
- Least Concern (IUCN 3.1)

Scientific classification
- Kingdom: Animalia
- Phylum: Chordata
- Class: Reptilia
- Order: Squamata
- Suborder: Serpentes
- Family: Colubridae
- Genus: Oligodon
- Species: O. octolineatus

Binomial name
- Oligodon octolineatus (Schneider, 1801)

= Eight-striped kukri snake =

Species of snake

The eight-striped kukri snake, eight-lined kukri snake, or Grace's kukri snake (Oligodon octolineatus) is a species of snake of the family Colubridae.

The species is gonochoric and reproduces sexually with oviparity.

The species can be found in countries like Malaysia, Singapore, Brunei, and Indonesia.

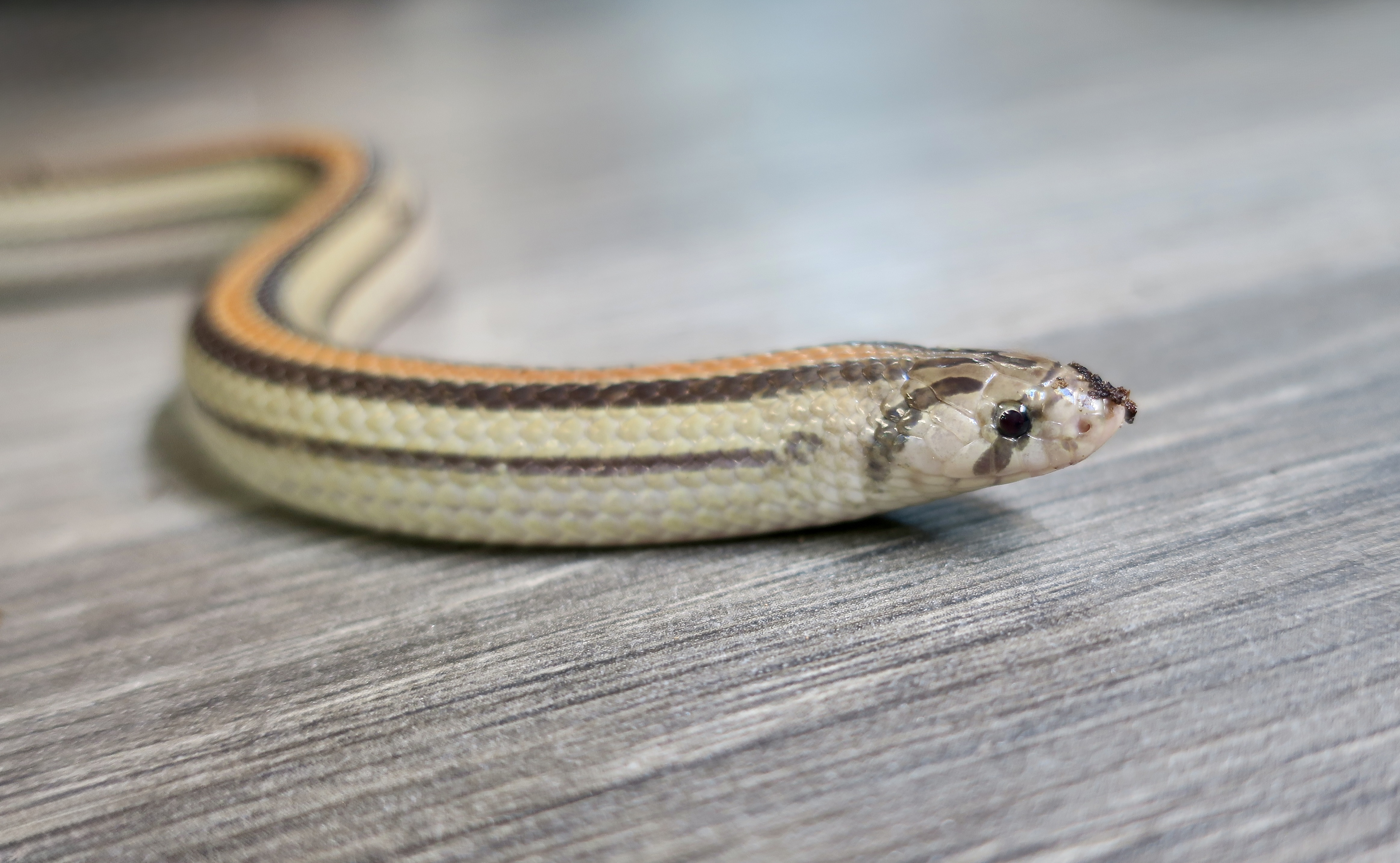
At 9th Island Reptiles, a store in Las Vegas.
