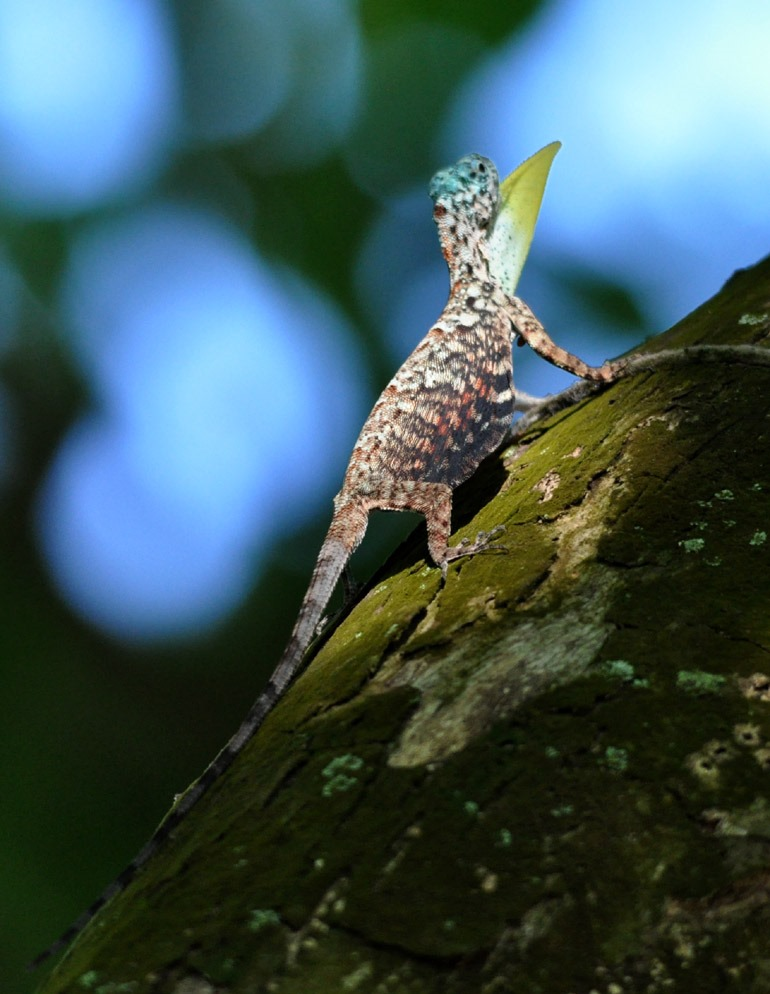
- Male Draco sumatranus extending gular flap at Kent Ridge Park, Singapore

Conservation status
- Least Concern (IUCN 3.1)

Scientific classification
- Kingdom: Animalia
- Phylum: Chordata
- Class: Reptilia
- Order: Squamata
- Suborder: Iguania
- Family: Agamidae
- Genus: Draco
- Species: D. sumatranus

Binomial name
- Draco sumatranus Schlegel, 1844

Synonyms
- Draco viridis var. sumatrana Schlegel, 1844; Draco volans sumatranus — Musters, 1983; Draco sumatranus — McGuire & Heang, 2001

= Draco sumatranus =

Common gliding lizard

Species of lizard

Draco sumatranus, the common gliding lizard, is a species of agamid lizard endemic to Southeast Asia. It has elongated ribs and skin flaps on the sides of its body. When opened, these skin flaps allow it to glide between tree trunks.

== Behavior ==
It is primarily a tree dweller, except that the females come down to the forest floor to lay eggs.

== Description ==
The body length is of about 9 cm (3.5 in), with a slightly longer tail. The body is of a dark grey/brown colouration with stripes and patterns to help it camouflage against the tree trunks. The males have a yellow triangular flap of skin under the chin, the gular fold, which is used to communicate with other lizards, mostly for mating. Females have a much smaller and blue flap.

== Diet ==
They feed on small insects. Usually ants and termites.

== Habitat ==
They are relatively common in forests and in urban settings such as parks and gardens.

== Geographic range ==
They are found in Southeast Asia: Indonesia, Malaysia, Singapore, and Palawan.

== Taxonomy ==
It was formerly considered a sub-species of Draco volans.
