= Cnemaspis purnamai =

Scientific classification
- Kingdom: Animalia
- Phylum: Chordata
- Class: Reptilia
- Order: Squamata
- Suborder: Gekkota
- Family: Gekkonidae
- Genus: Cnemaspis
- Species: C. purnamai

Binomial name
- Cnemaspis purnamai Riyanto, Hamidy, Sidik & Gunalen, 2017

Species of lizard

Cnemaspis purnamai is a species of geckos endemic to Belitung Island in Indonesia.
