= Cyrtodactylus awalriyantoi =

Scientific classification
- Kingdom: Animalia
- Phylum: Chordata
- Class: Reptilia
- Order: Squamata
- Suborder: Gekkota
- Family: Gekkonidae
- Genus: Cyrtodactylus
- Species: C. awalriyantoi

Binomial name
- Cyrtodactylus awalriyantoi Ahda, Nugraha, Hon Tjong, Kurniawan, Amardi, Fauzi & Lin, 2023

Species of lizard

Cyrtodactylus awalriyantoi, or Awal Riyanto's bent-toed gecko, is a species of gecko that is endemic to West Sumatra, Indonesia. It was described as a new species in 2023 and is named after the Indonesian herpetologist Awal Riyanto. It is a small Cyrtodactylus, with a snout–vent length of 37.5–53.78 m. The length of the tail is 31.4–54.77 mm including the tip. The head is triangular and slightly flattened, with a distinguishable neck. The body and forelimbs are moderately long. The tail is longer than the body and circular in shape, tapering towards the tip. It is endemic to Sumatra, where it has been recorded from Sarasah Gasang Waterfall, Lembah Anai Nature Reserve, Sungai Sirah village, Bungus Selatan village, and Sarasah Uwak waterfall. Most specimens have been collected from near streams at elevations of 7–767 m.

== Taxonomy ==
Cyrtodactylus awalriyantoi was described by the herpetologist Yuni Ahda and colleagues in 2023 on the basis of an adult male specimen collected from Sarasah Gasang waterfall in Agam Regency, Sumatra. It is named after the Indonesian herpetologist Awal Riyanto to honor his work studying the Indonesian species of Cyrtodactylus. In English, the species is known as Awal Riyanto's bent-toed gecko. The Indonesian common name for the species Cicak Jari Lengkung Awal Riyanto.

== Description ==
Awal Riyanto's bent-toed gecko is a small Cyrtodactylus, with a snout–vent length of 37.5–53.78 m. The length of the tail is 31.4–54.77 mm including the tip. The head is triangular and slightly flattened, with a distinguishable neck. The body and forelimbs are moderately long. The tail is longer than the body and circular in shape, tapering towards the tip.

The upperside of the body is dark grey to brown. The top of head is blackish, with irregular broken spots scattered on the parietal region up to the nostril. The underside of the head, trunk, and limbs are white, pale grey, or cream. The underside of the tail is cream in the first third towards the body, and then tends to black with narrow white rings.

Awal Riyanto's bent-toed gecko can be distinguished from all other species in its genus by its small size; axilla to groin distance of 16.65–24.31 mm; head width of 6.21–8.45 mm; 16–19 longitudinal rows of dorsal tubercles; 31–41 paravertebral tubercles 31–41; 32–43 ventral scales; 24–49 enlarged precloacal and femoral scales; precloacal pores rarely present, maximum only two pores in one individual; no precloacal groove or depression; postcloacal tubercles two on each side; 14–19 subdigital lamellae on fourth toe; 9–15 supralabial scales; 9–12 infralabial scales; 3–4 internasal scales; and 3–6 gular scales bordering the first pair of postmental scales.

== Distribution and habitat ==
Awal Riyanto's bent-toed gecko is endemic to Sumatra, where it has been recorded from Sarasah Gasang Waterfall, Lembah Anai Nature Reserve, Sungai Sirah village, Bungus Selatan village, and Sarasah Uwak waterfall. Most specimens have been collected from near streams at elevations of 7–767 m. Individuals have been found on leaves and twigs around one metre above the ground. Some specimens have also been encountered further away from streams, on bushes beside paddy fields and on bushes in the vicinity of a waterfall, 60–70 cm above the ground.
