= Cnemaspis pagai =

Scientific classification
- Kingdom: Animalia
- Phylum: Chordata
- Class: Reptilia
- Order: Squamata
- Suborder: Gekkota
- Family: Gekkonidae
- Genus: Cnemaspis
- Species: C. pagai

Binomial name
- Cnemaspis pagai Iskandar, McGuire & Amarsinghe, 2017

Species of lizard

Cnemaspis pagai is a species of gecko endemic to South Pagai in Indonesia.
