= Cnemaspis aceh =

Scientific classification
- Kingdom: Animalia
- Phylum: Chordata
- Class: Reptilia
- Order: Squamata
- Suborder: Gekkota
- Family: Gekkonidae
- Genus: Cnemaspis
- Species: C. aceh

Binomial name
- Cnemaspis aceh Iskandar, McGuire & Amarasinghe, 2017

Species of lizard

Cnemaspis aceh is a species of gecko endemic to Sumatra in Indonesia.
