= Cyrtodactylus lateralis =

Scientific classification
- Kingdom: Animalia
- Phylum: Chordata
- Class: Reptilia
- Order: Squamata
- Suborder: Gekkota
- Family: Gekkonidae
- Genus: Cyrtodactylus
- Species: C. lateralis

Binomial name
- Cyrtodactylus lateralis (Werner, 1896)

Synonyms
- Gymnodactylus lateralis

Species of lizard

Cyrtodactylus lateralis, also known as Werner's prehensile-tailed bent-toed gecko, the Sumatra bow-fingered gecko, or the spiny forest gecko, is a species of gecko that is endemic to Sumatra.
