= Calamaria modesta =

Conservation status
- Least Concern (IUCN 3.1)

Scientific classification
- Kingdom: Animalia
- Phylum: Chordata
- Class: Reptilia
- Order: Squamata
- Suborder: Serpentes
- Family: Colubridae
- Genus: Calamaria
- Species: C. modesta

Binomial name
- Calamaria modesta Duméril, Bibron, & A.H.A. Duméril, 1854
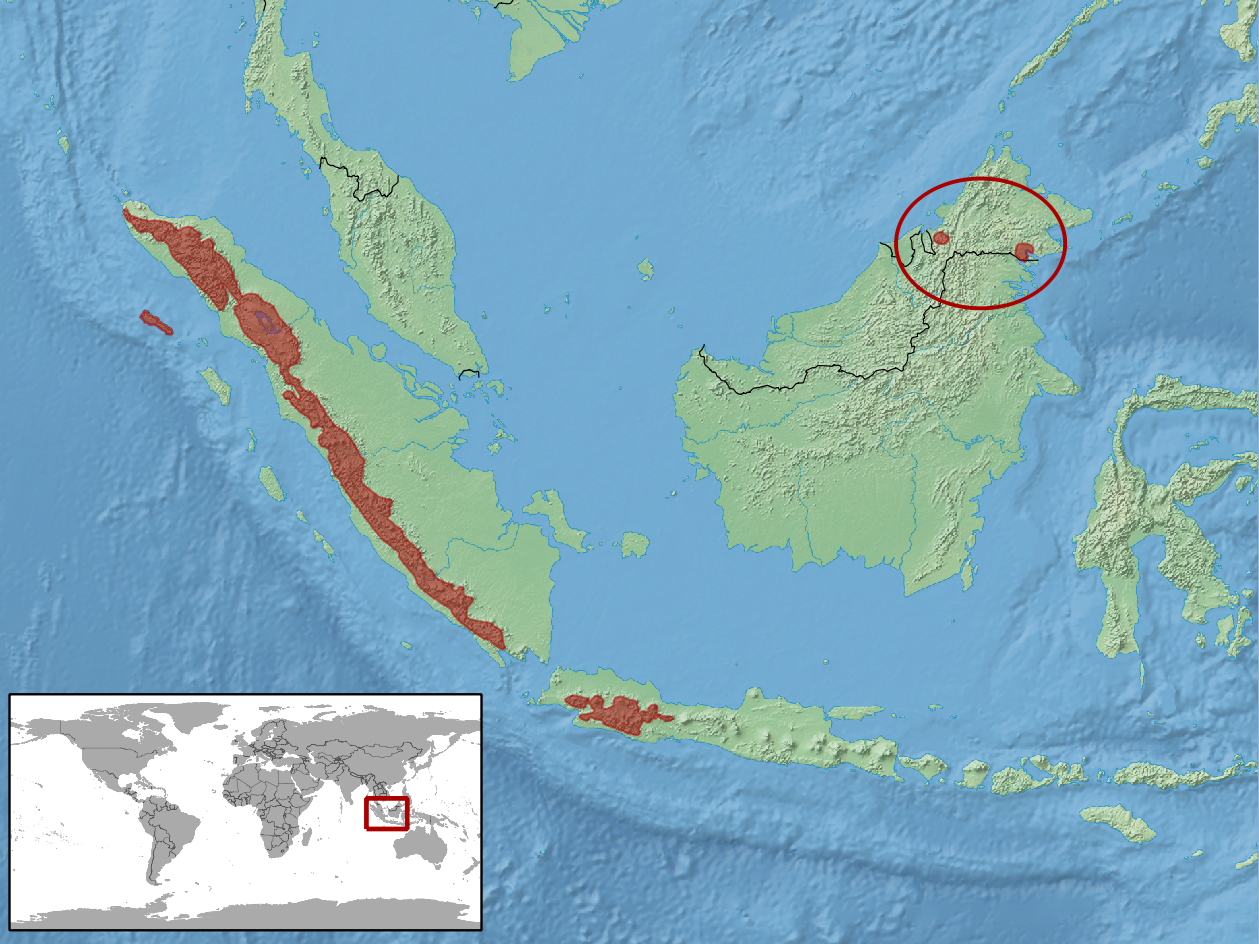

Synonyms
- List: Calamaria modesta Duméril, Bibron & Duméril, 1854; Calamaria monochrous Bleeker, 1860; Calamaria modesta Günther, 1873; Calamaria bogorensis Lidt De Jeude, 1890; Calamaria modesta var. bogorensis Boettger, 1894; Calamaria mjöbergi Lönnberg & Rendahl, 1925; Calamaria virgulata Boulenger, 1894; Calamaria elegans De Rooij, 1917; Calamaria simalurensis De Rooij, 1917; Calamaria lautensis De Rooij, 1917; Calamaria lautensis Daan & Hillenius, 1966; Calamaria lautensis Manthey, 1983; Calamaria modesta Inger & Voris, 2001

Species of snake

Calamaria modesta is a dwarf snake species in the genus Calamaria found in Java.
