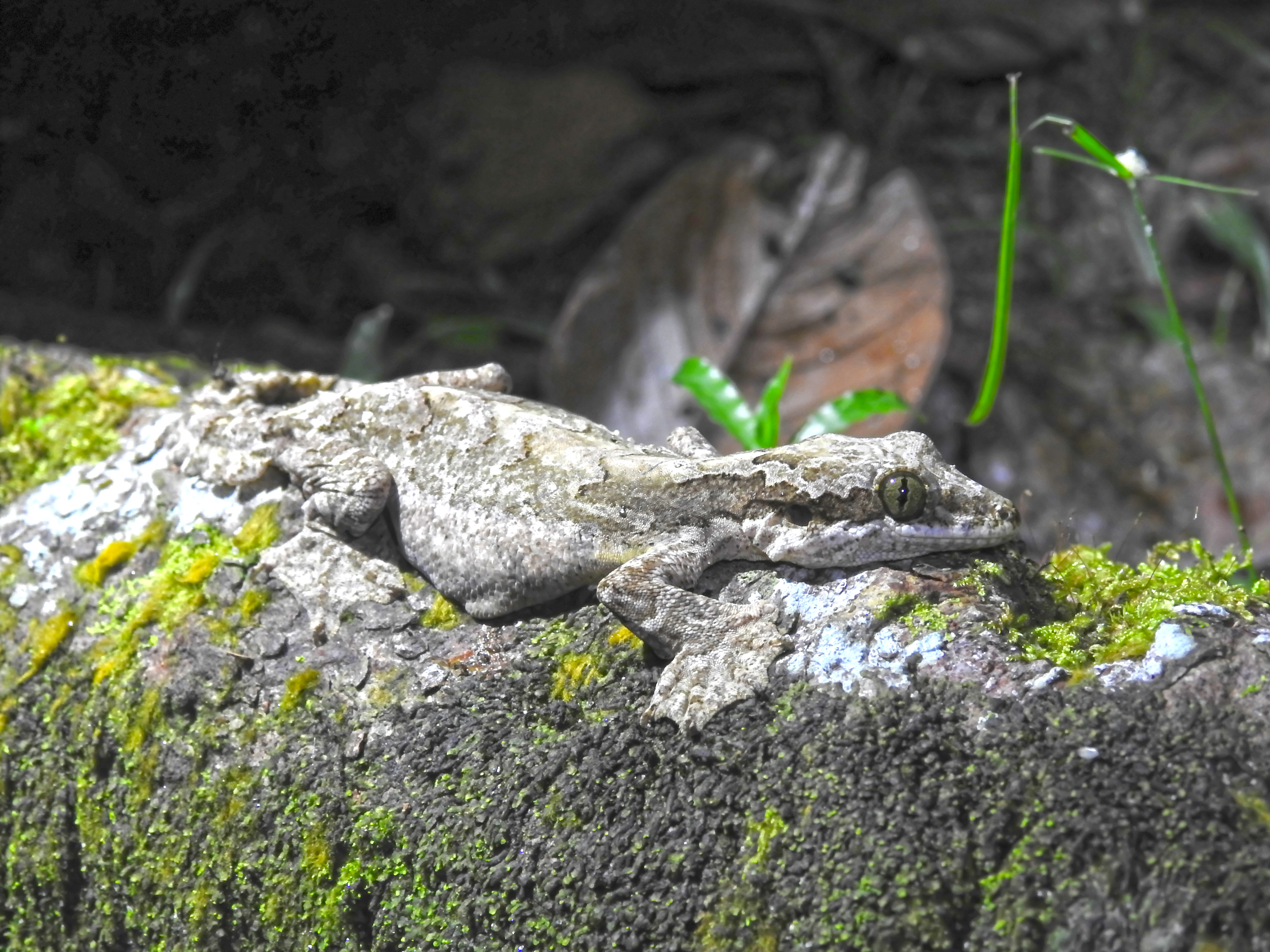

Conservation status
- Least Concern (IUCN 3.1)

Scientific classification
- Kingdom: Animalia
- Phylum: Chordata
- Class: Reptilia
- Order: Squamata
- Suborder: Gekkota
- Family: Gekkonidae
- Genus: Gekko
- Species: G. kuhli

Binomial name
- Gekko kuhli (Stejneger, 1902)

Synonyms
- Lacerta homalocephala Creveldt, 1809 (preoccupied name); Platydactylus homalocephalus — A.M.C. Duméril & Bibron, 1836; Ptychozoon kuhli Stejneger, 1902 (nomen novum); Gekko (Ptychozoon) kuhli — Wood et al., 2019

= Gekko kuhli =

Species of lizard

Gekko kuhli, commonly known as Kuhl's flying gecko, Kuhl's parachute gecko, or the gliding gecko, is a species of lizard in the family Gekkonidae. The species is found in Southeast Asia.

== Etymology ==
The specific name, kuhli, is in honor of German zoologist Heinrich Kuhl.

== Description ==
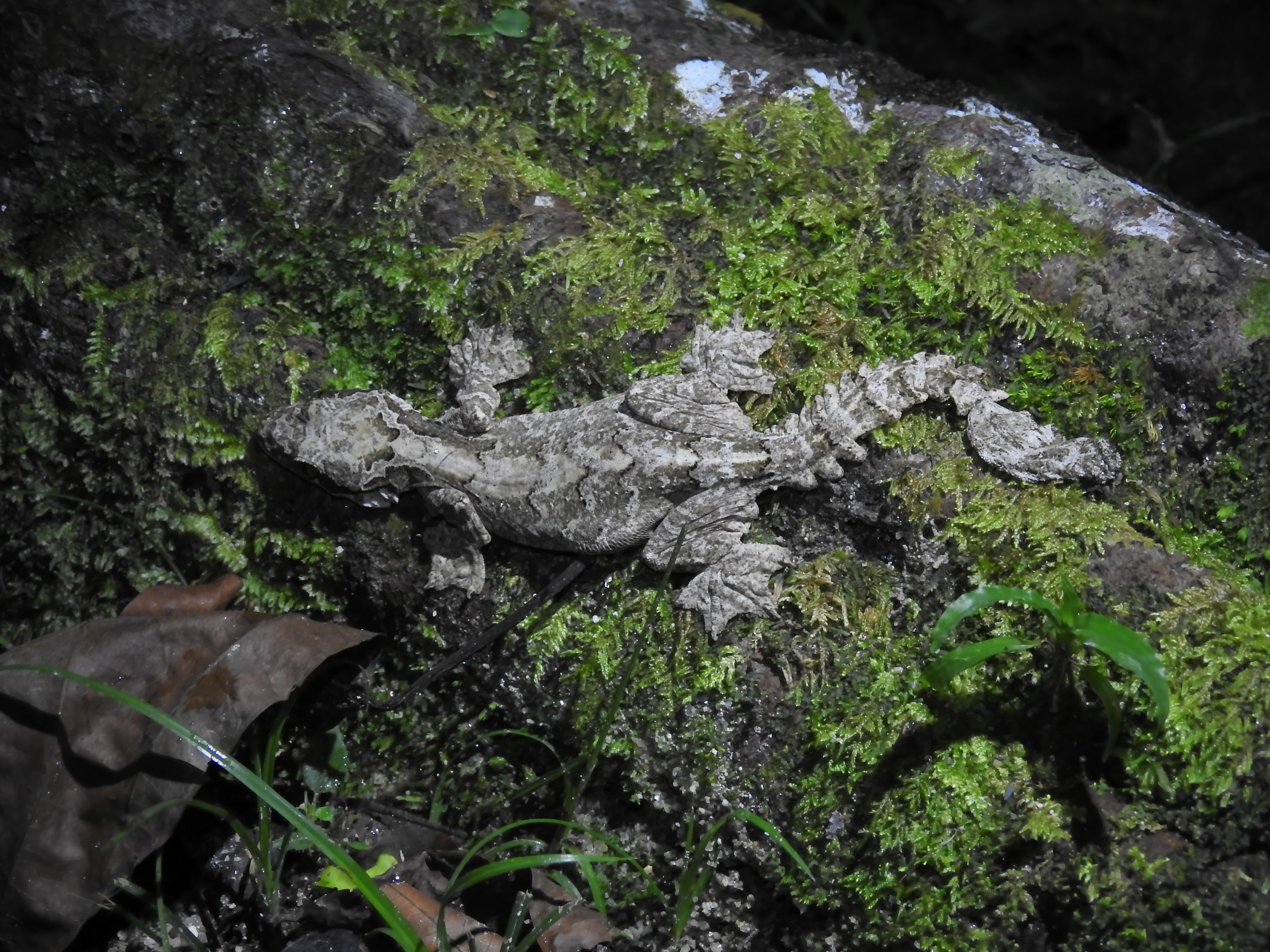
Dorsal view of Kuhl's flying gecko in Kuala Lumpur, Malaysia

G. kuhli has adaptations to its skin, including flaps on either side of its body, webbed feet, and a flattened tail to allow it to glide over short distances. This gecko has a remarkable camouflage. The flaps of skin along its sides help it blend with tree bark. Often, its eyes are the only way to distinguish it from its surroundings. This use of camouflage by G. kuhli has caused need for some other adaptions to protect it from the increased UV exposure. Despite being nocturnal, it is considered heliothermic because of the extended sun exposure it receives while resting during the day. This increased UV exposure has led to the adaption of pigmented internal organs to protect the lizard's more important organs from UV damage.

Kuhl's flying gecko, like many other gecko species, has evolved intricate toe pads with microscopic hairs that can adhere to nearly any surface, including glass.

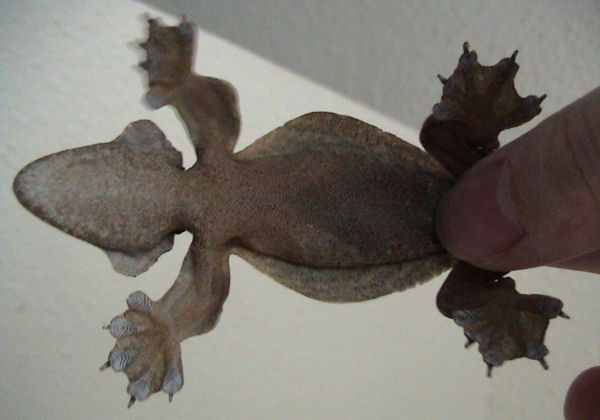
The underside of Kuhl's flying gecko (Gekko kuhli). Note the gliding adaptations: flaps of skin on the legs, feet, sides of the body, and on the sides of the head.

== Geographic range ==
G. kuhli is found in the Malay Peninsula (southern Thailand, Malaysia, Singapore) and many adjacent islands and in the Greater Sunda Islands, including the larger islands (Sumatra, Java, Borneo, and Sulawesi) and many smaller ones. Its presence in Myanmar and the Nicobar Islands (India) is unconfirmed.

== Habitat ==
The preferred natural habitat of G. kuhli is forest.

== As a pet ==

The common flying gecko requires, among other things, a terrarium of at least 20 gallons (57–76 litres), preferably tall rather than long, and careful handling. It should be handled as little as possible, due to possible damage to its skin.
