= List of reptiles of Singapore =

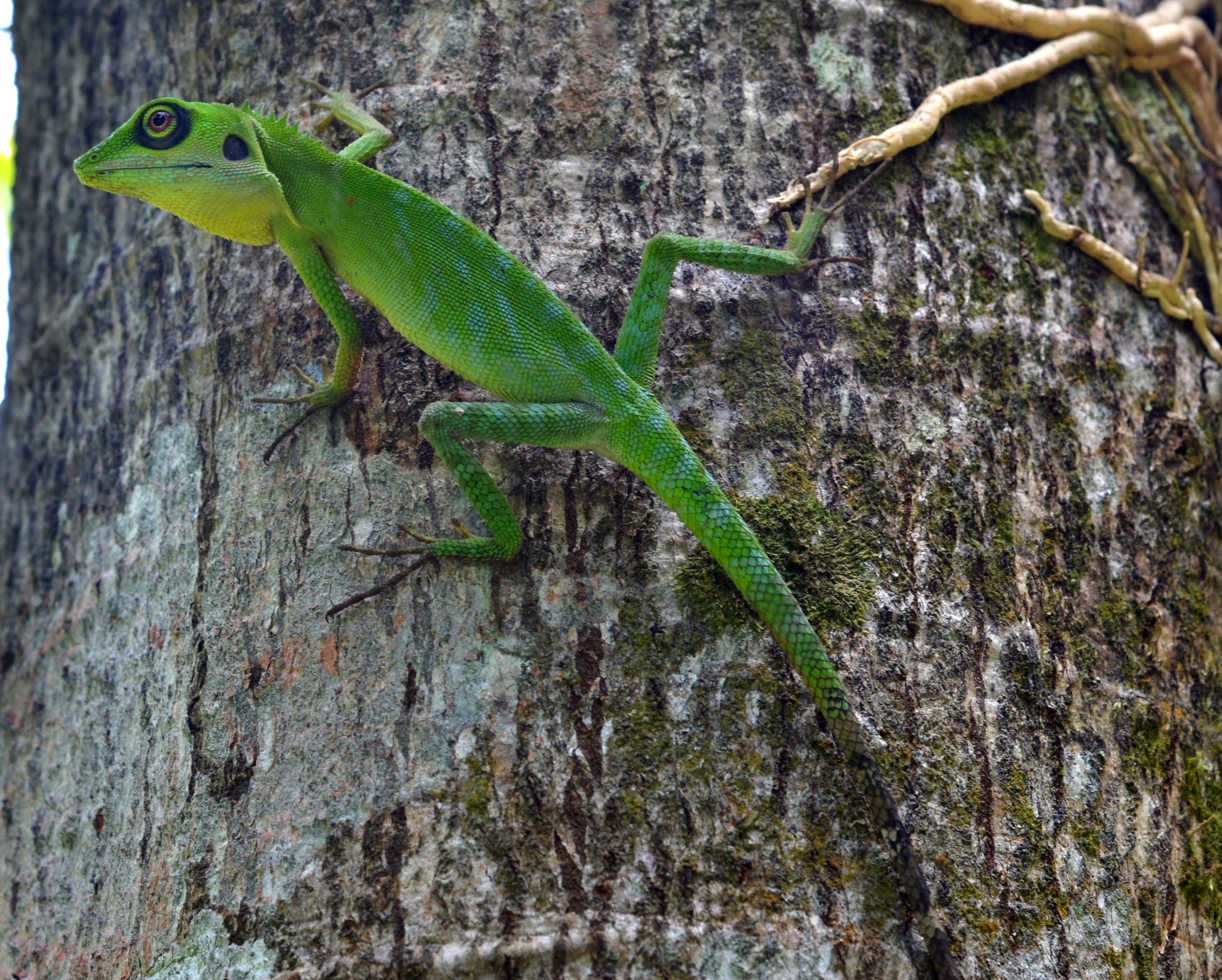
Green crested lizard (Bronchocela cristatella) at Bukit Batok

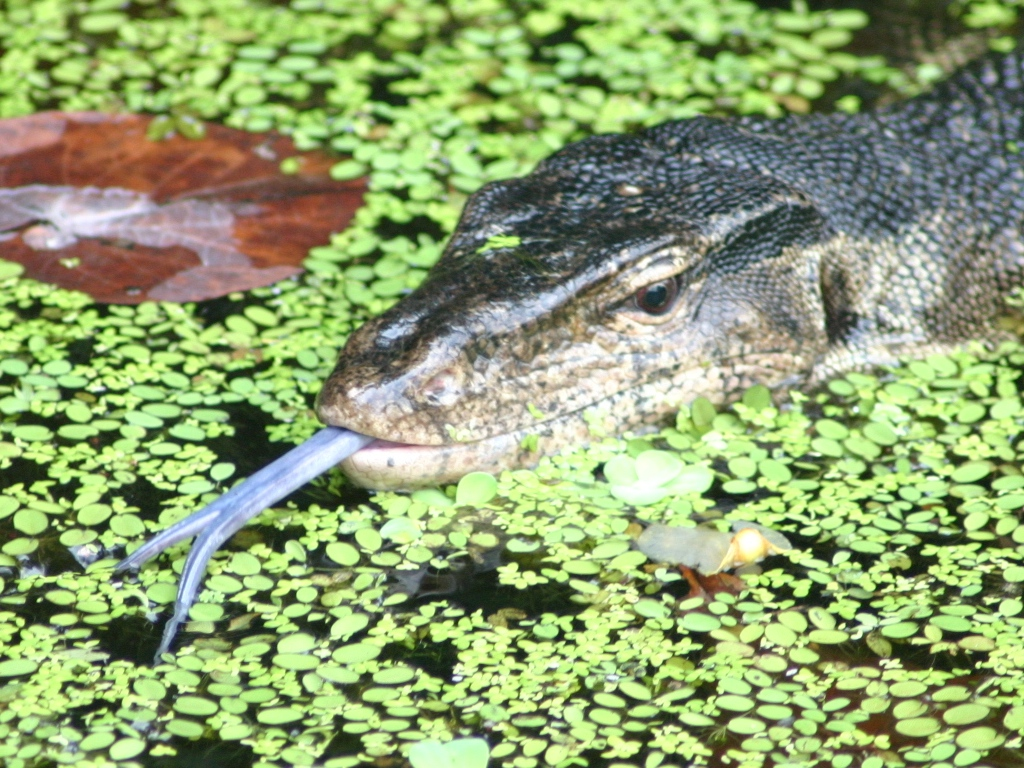
Water monitor (Varanus salvator) at Sungei Buloh Wetland Reserve

There are about 110 species of reptiles in Singapore. Most of them are small or rarely seen, but there are a few which are large or prominent. The largest reptiles found in Singapore are the estuarine crocodile and the reticulated python. The ones most commonly seen in urban areas are the house geckos (typically called house lizard by the lay-person) and the invasive changeable lizard. The changeable lizard has pushed the local green crested lizard into forested areas.

In gardens and parks, one can often see common sun skinks, the introduced red-eared sliders and flying lizards.

Water monitors are common in rivers and mangrove. Another monitor that can be found in Singapore is the clouded monitor, which is a forest species. It is smaller than the Malayan water monitor, has slit nostrils and is paler in colour. In 2008, the Dumeril's monitor was rediscovered in the Central Catchment Nature Reserve.

Equatorial spitting cobras can still be found in desolated urban areas of Singapore. The larger king cobra is much rarer. The banded krait sometimes show up as road kill. There are also 2 species of coral snake and 9 species of sea snake.

== List of reptiles ==
=== Order Crocodylia (crocodilians) ===
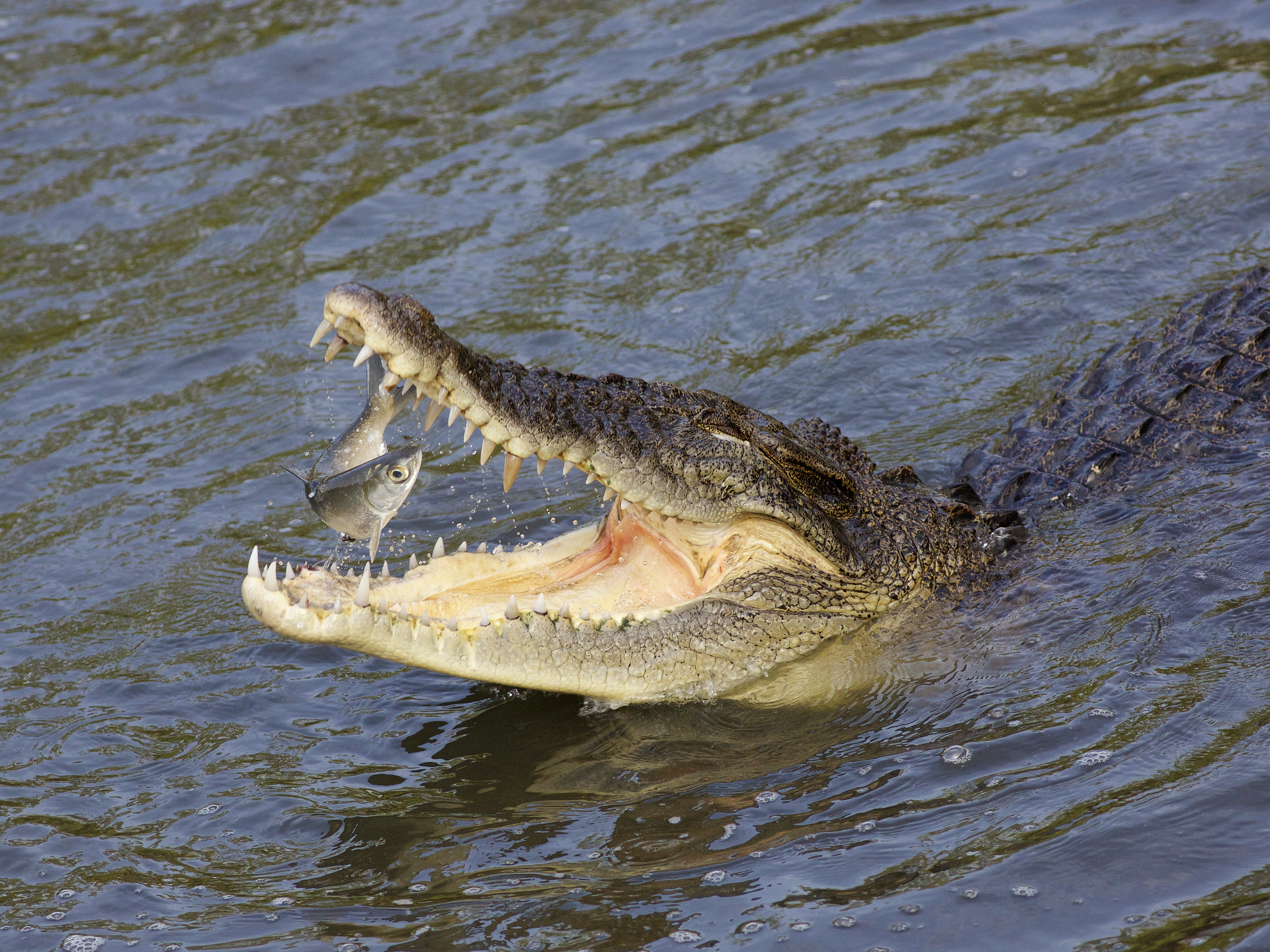
Saltwater crocodile (Crocodylus porosus) at Sungei Buloh Wetland Reserve

==== Family Crocodylidae (crocodiles) ====
- Estuarine crocodile (Crocodylus porosus) - formerly widespread, recent sightings in Sungei Buloh Wetland Reserve, Kranji, Lim Chu Kang, Woodlands Waterfront, Sembawang, Lower Seletar Reservoir, Pasir Ris, Changi, East Coast

==== Family Gavialidae (gharials) ====
- False gharial (Tomistoma schlegelii) - Possible escaped juvenile caught in Pasir Ris in 1991

=== Order Squamata (lizards and snakes) ===
==== Family Eublepharidae (eyelid geckos) ====
- Fox-faced gecko (Aeluroscalabotes felinus) - Central Catchment Nature Reserve

==== Family Gekkonidae (geckos) ====
- Peninsular rock gecko (Cnemaspis peninsularis) - Bukit Timah Nature Reserve, Central Catchment Nature Reserve, Pulau Tekong
- Singapore bent-toed gecko (Cyrtodactylus majulah) - Central Catchment Nature Reserve, Admiralty Park
- Panti bent-toed gecko (Cyrtodactylyus pantiensis) - Pulau Tekong
- Marbled bent-toed gecko (Cyrtodactylus quadrivirgatus) - Central Catchment Nature Reserve, Admiralty Park
- Peninsular bent-toed gecko (Cyrtodactylus semenanjungensis) - Central Catchment Nature Reserve
- Banded forest gecko (Cyrtodactylus peninsularis) - Bukit Timah Nature Reserve
- Four-clawed gecko (Gehyra mutilata) - common and widespread
- Brown's flap-legged gecko (Gekko browni) - Pulau Tekong
- Tokay gecko (Gekko gecko) - introduced
- Horsfield's flying gecko (Gekko horsfieldii) - indeterminate
- Kuhl's flying gecko (Gekko kuhli) - Pulau Tekong
- Spotted house gecko (Gekko monarchus) - common and widespread
- Large forest gecko (Gekko hulk) - Bukit Timah Nature Reserve, Central Catchment Nature Reserve (possibly extirpated)
- Frilly gecko (Hemidactylus craspedotus) - Bukit Timah Nature Reserve, Central Catchment Nature Reserve
- Flat-tailed gecko (Hemidactylus platyurus) - common and widespread
- Brooke's house gecko (Hemidactylus brookii) - likely introduced
- Common house gecko (Hemidactylus frenatus) - common and widespread
- Indo-Pacific gecko (Hemidactylus garnotii) - indeterminate
- Lowland dwarf gecko (Hemiphyllodactylus typus) - Central Catchment Nature Reserve, Western Catchment, Mandai Mangroves, Pasir Ris, Bidadari
- Mourning gecko (Lepidodactylus lugubris) - widespread in coastal habitats

==== Family Agamidae (agamids) ====
- Earless agamid (Aphaniotis fusca) - Bukit Timah Nature Reserve, Central Catchment Nature Reserve
- Green crested lizard (Bronchocela cristatella) - forests and woodland habitats on Singapore Island, Pulau Ubin, Pulau Tekong, Sentosa
- Siamese blue crested lizard (Calotes goetzi) - introduced, Sungei Tengah
- Changeable lizard (Calotes versicolor) - introduced, common and widespread on Singapore Island, Pulau Ubin, Pulau Tekong, Lazarus Island, St. John's Island, Sentosa, Pulau Semakau
- Black-bearded flying lizard (Draco melanopogon) - Bukit Timah Nature Reserve, Central Catchment Nature Reserve
- Five-banded flying lizard (Draco quinquefasciatus) - Bukit Timah Nature Reserve, Central Catchment Nature Reserve
- Common gliding lizard (Draco sumatranus) - common and widespread on Singapore Island, Pulau Ubin, Pulau Tekong, Sentosa
- Orange-bearded flying lizard (Draco abbreviatus) - indeterminate
- Red-edged flying lizard (Draco formosus) - indeterminate
- Peninsular horned tree lizard (Acanthosaura armata) - indeterminate
- Bell's anglehead lizard (Gonocephalus bellii) - indeterminate

==== Family Dactyloidae (anoles) ====
- Brown anole (Norops sagrei) - introduced, breeding population in Gardens by the Bay, Jurong Lake Gardens and Mandai, individuals spotted in Bishan, Tanah Merah, Punggol, Singapore Botanic Gardens

==== Family Iguanidae (iguanas) ====
- Green iguana (Iguana iguana) - introduced, breeding populations in Jurong Hill, Jurong Bird Park, Sungei Tengah, Choa Chu Kang, escapees occasionally seen elsewhere

==== Family Scincidae (skinks) ====
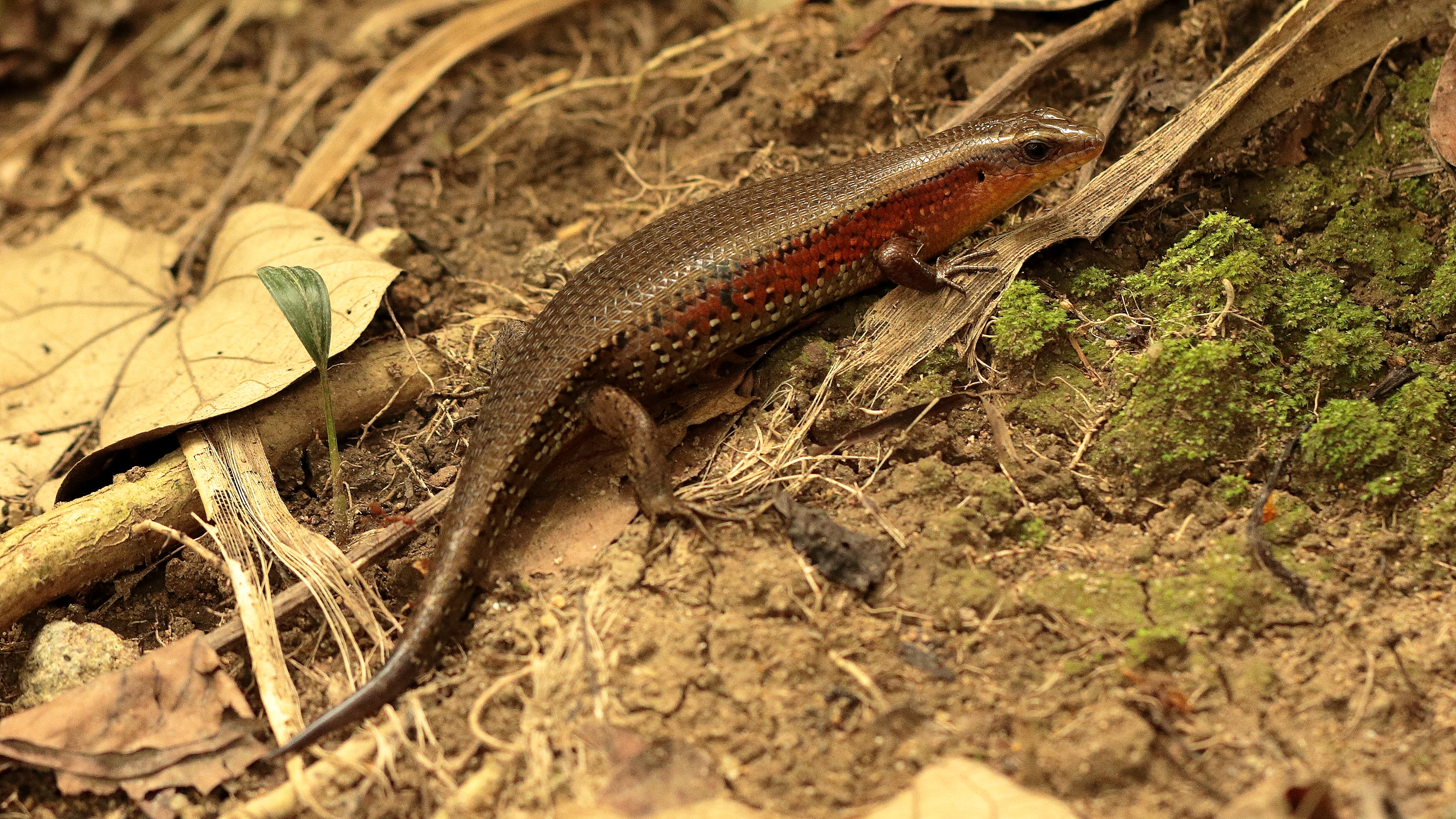
A skink (most likely the many-lined sun skink) alongside the Berlayer Creek Boardwalk in southern Singapore, near Labrador Nature Reserve.

- Olive tree skink (Dasia olivacea) - Bukit Timah Nature Reserve, Central Catchment Nature Reserve, Pulau Ubin
- Brown tree skink (Dasia grisea) - Bukit Timah Nature Reserve, Central Catchment Nature Reserve
- Mangrove skink (Emoia atrocostata) - Sungei Buloh Wetland Reserve, Mandai Mangroves, Pulau Tekong
- Many-lined sun skink (Eutropis multifasciata) - common and widespread
- Striped sun skink (Eutropis rugifera) - Bukit Timah Nature Reserve, Central Catchment Nature Reserve
- Striped tree skink (Lipinia vittigera) - Bukit Timah Nature Reserve, Central Catchment Nature Reserve
- Short-limbed supple skink (Lygosoma siamense) - possibly introduced - Singapore Botanic Gardens
- Garden supple skink (Subdoluseps bowringii) - common and widespread
- Singapore swamp skink (Tytthoscincus temasekensis) - Central Catchment Nature Reserve

==== Family Varanidae (monitor lizards) ====
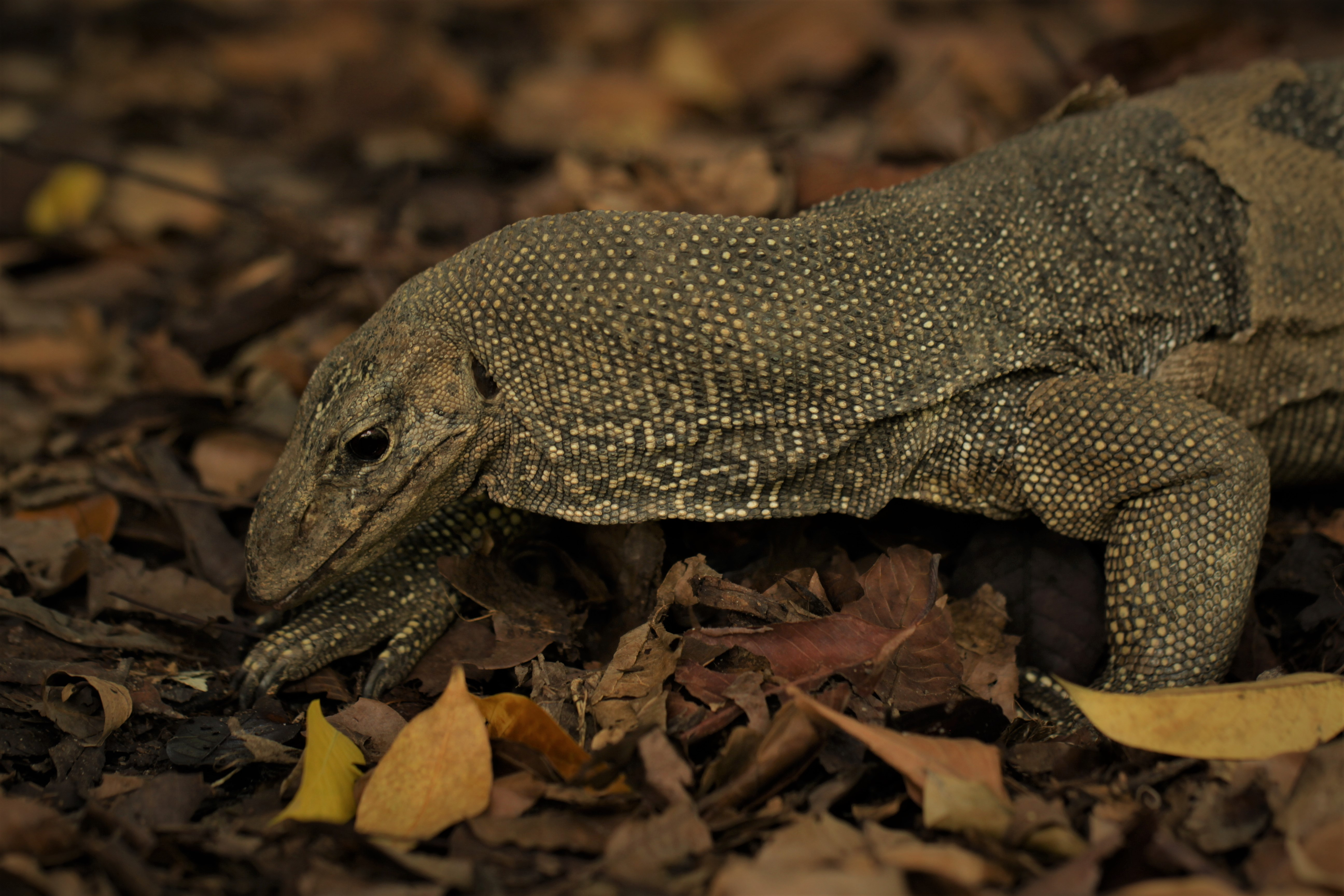
A clouded monitor (Varanus nebulosus) in Singapore Botanic Gardens hunting for worms and other edibles under leaves. It can be distinguished from the Malayan water monitor — the other common monitor in Singapore — by its slit nostrils midway up the snout vs round nostrils on the tip.

- Clouded monitor (Varanus nebulosus) - Bukit Timah Nature Reserve, Central Catchment Nature Reserve, Bukit Batok Nature Park, Singapore Botanic Gardens, Pulau Ubin, Pulau Tekong
- Dumeril's monitor (Varanus dumerilii) - very rarely seen, Nee Soon swamp forest
- Malayan water monitor (Varanus salvator) - common and widespread in habitats close to water

==== Family Typhlopidae (blind snakes) ====
- Brahminy blind snake (Indotyphlops braminus)
- Striped blind snake (Ramphotyphlops lineatus) - Bukit Timah Nature Reserve
- White-bellied blind snake (Argyrophis muelleri) - Central Catchment Nature Reserve, Pulau Ubin

==== Family Cylindrophiidae (Asian pipe snakes) ====
- Red-tailed pipe snake (Cylindrophis ruffus)

==== Family Xenopeltidae (sunbeam snakes) ====
- Sunbeam snake (Xenopeltis unicolor) - common and widespread

==== Family Pythonidae (pythons) ====
- Malaysian blood python (Python brongersmai) - extirpated
- Reticulated python (Malayopython reticulatus) - common and widespread

==== Family Acrochordidae (file snakes) ====
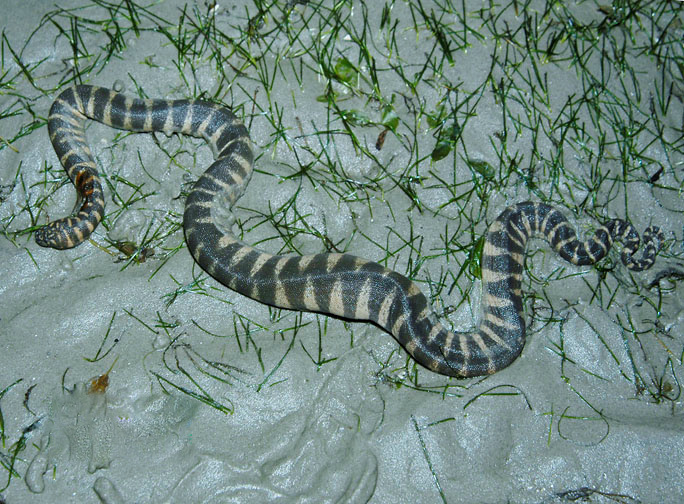
File snake (Acrochordus granulatus), a marine file snake

- Banded file snake (Acrochordus granulatus) - Straits of Johor, Pulau Semakau

==== Family Colubridae (colubrids) ====
===== Subfamily Sibynophiinae =====
- Black-headed collared snake (Sibynophis melanocephalus) - Bukit Timah Nature Reserve, Central Catchment Nature Reserve, Western Catchment, Kranji, Pulau Ubin, Pulau Tekong

===== Subfamily Natricinae =====
- Peters' keelback (Hebius petersii) - Central Catchment Nature Reserve
- Southern chequered keelback (Fowlea flavipunctatus) - introduced, possibly extirpated
- Blue-necked keelback (Rhabdophis rhodomelas) - Bukit Timah Nature Reserve, Central Catchment Nature Reserve
- Red-necked keelback (Rhabdophis subminiatus) - indeterminate
- Spotted keelback (Xenochrophis maculatus) - Bukit Timah Nature Reserve, Central Catchment Nature Reserve
- Triangle keelback (Xenochrophis trianguligerus) - Central Catchment Nature Reserve
- Striped keelback (Xenochrophis vittatus) - introduced

===== Subfamily Calamariinae =====
- Red-bellied reed snake (Calamaria albiventer) - indeterminate
- Gimlett's reed snake (Calamaria lovii gimletti) - Central Catchment Nature Reserve, Sentosa
- Variable reed snake (Calamaria lumbricoidea) - Bukit Timah Nature Reserve, Central Catchment Nature Reserve
- Pink-headed reed snake (Calamaria schlegeli) - Bukit Timah Nature Reserve, Central Catchment Nature Reserve
- Dwarf reed snake (Pseudorabdion longiceps) - Bukit Timah Nature Reserve, Central Catchment Nature Reserve, Pulau Ubin, Pulau Tekong

===== Subfamily Ahaetullinae =====
- Speckle-headed whip snake (Ahaetulla fasciolata) - Bukit Timah Nature Reserve, Singapore Botanic Gardens
- Malayan whip snake (Ahaetulla mycterizans) - Bukit Timah Nature Reserve, Central Catchment Nature Reserve
- Oriental whip snake (Ahaetulla prasina) - common and widespread
- Golden tree snake (Chrysopelea ornata) - introduced, individuals seen at Shenton Way, Gardens by the Bay, Lim Chu Kang, West Coast
- Paradise tree snake (Chrysopelea paradisi) - common and widespread
- Twin-barred tree snake (Chrysopelea pelias) - Bukit Timah Nature Reserve, Central Catchment Nature Reserve, Pulau Ubin
- Striped bronzeback (Dendrelaphis caudolineatus) - common and widespread
- Blue bronzeback (Dendrelaphis cyanochloris) - Bukit Timah Nature Reserve, Central Catchment Nature Reserve
- Elegant bronzeback (Dendrelaphis formosus) - Bukit Timah Nature Reserve, Central Catchment Nature Reserve
- Haas' bronzeback (Dendrelaphis haasi) - Central Catchment Nature Reserve
- Kopstein's bronzeback (Dendrelaphis kopsteini) - Bukit Timah Nature Reserve, Central Catchment Nature Reserve
- Painted bronzeback (Dendrelaphis pictus) - common and widespread
- Keel-bellied whip snake (Dryophiops rubescens) - Bukit Timah Nature Reserve, Central Catchment Nature Reserve, Western Catchment, Pulau Ubin, Pulau Tekong

===== Subfamily Colubrinae =====
- Dog-toothed cat snake (Boiga cynodon) - Bukit Timah Nature Reserve, Central Catchment Nature Reserve, Pulau Ubin, Pulau Tekong
- Gold-ringed cat snake (Boiga melanota) - Bukit Timah Nature Reserve, Central Catchment Nature Reserve, Mandai Mangroves, Pulau Ubin, Pulau Tekong, St. John's Island, Pulau Semakau
- White-spotted cat snake (Boiga drapiezii) - Central Catchment Nature Reserve
- Jasper cat snake (Boiga jaspidea) - Central Catchment Nature Reserve, Pulau Tekong
- Common Malayan racer (Coelognathus flavolineatus)
- Copperhead racer (Coelognathus radiatus) - indeterminate
- Malayan bridle snake (Lycodon subannulatus) - Bukit Timah Nature Reserve, Central Catchment Nature Reserve
- Orange-bellied ringneck (Gongylosoma baliodeira) - Bukit Timah Nature Reserve, Central Catchment Nature Reserve
- Rainbow tree snake (Gonyophis margaritatus) - indeterminate
- Red-tailed racer (Gonyosoma oxycephalum)- Bukit Timah Nature Reserve, Central Catchment Nature Reserve, Pulau Tekong
- Tricoloured ringneck (Liopeltis tricolor)
- House wolf snake (Lycodon capucinus) - common and widespread
- Banded wolf snake (Lycodon subcinctus) - Central Catchment Nature Reserve, Pulau Tekong
- Brown kukri snake (Oligodon purpurascens) - Bukit Timah Nature Reserve, Central Catchment Nature Reserve
- Striped kukri snake (Oligodon octolineatus) - common and widespread
- Barred kukri snake (Oligodon signatus) - Bukit Timah Nature Reserve, Central Catchment Nature Reserve
- Striped racer (Orthriophis taeniurus) - indeterminate, historically recorded from Pulau Ubin
- Keeled rat snake (Ptyas carinata) - Bukit Timah Nature Reserve, Central Catchment Nature Reserve
- White-bellied rat snake (Ptyas fusca) - Bukit Timah Nature Reserve, Central Catchment Nature Reserve
- Indochinese rat snake (Ptyas korros)
- Banded rat snake (Ptyas mucosa) - indeterminate
- Malaysian brown snake (Xenelaphis hexagonotus) - Bukit Timah Nature Reserve, Central Catchment Nature Reserve

==== Family Homalopsidae (mud snakes) ====
- Keel-bellied water snake (Bitia hydroides) - indeterminate
- Cantor's water snake (Cantoria violacea)
- Dog-faced water snake (Cerberus schneiderii) - Straits of Johor, Pulau Semakau
- Rainbow water snake (Enhydris enhydris) - likely introduced
- Crab-eating water snake (Fordonia leucobalia)
- Yellow-lipped water snake (Gerarda prevostiana)
- Puff-faced water snake (Homalopsis buccata)
- Blackwater mud snake (Phytolopsis punctata) - Central Catchment Nature Reserve
- Selangor mud snake (Raclitia indica) - Central Catchment Nature Reserve

==== Family Psammodynastidae (mock vipers) ====
- Painted mock viper (Psammodynastes pictus) - Central Catchment Nature Reserve

==== Family Elapidae (cobras, coral snakes, kraits, sea snakes) ====
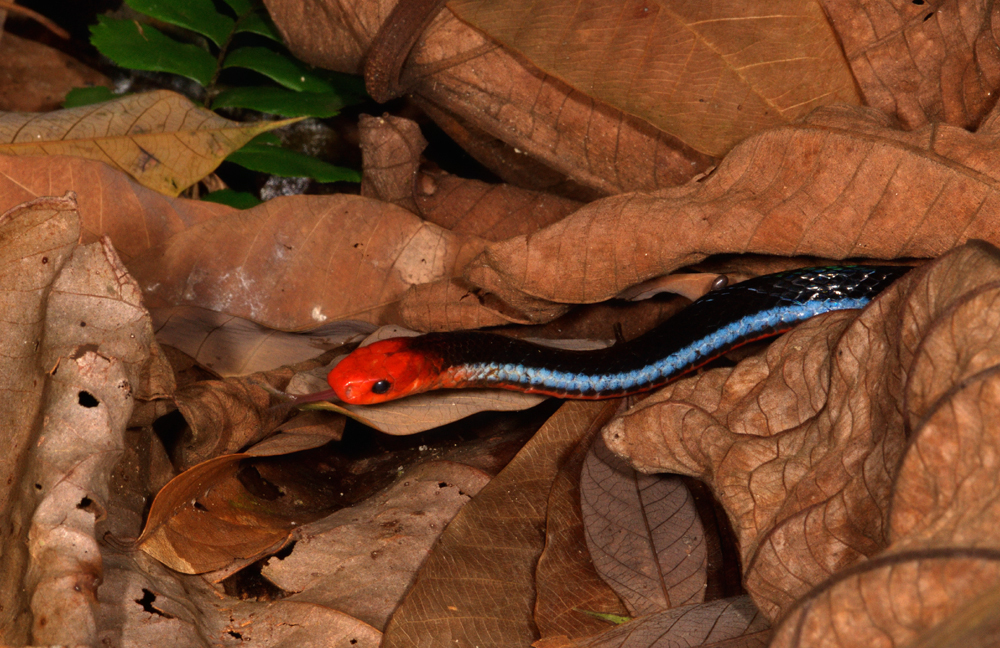
Blue Malayan coral snake (Calliophis bivirgatus) at Venus Drive

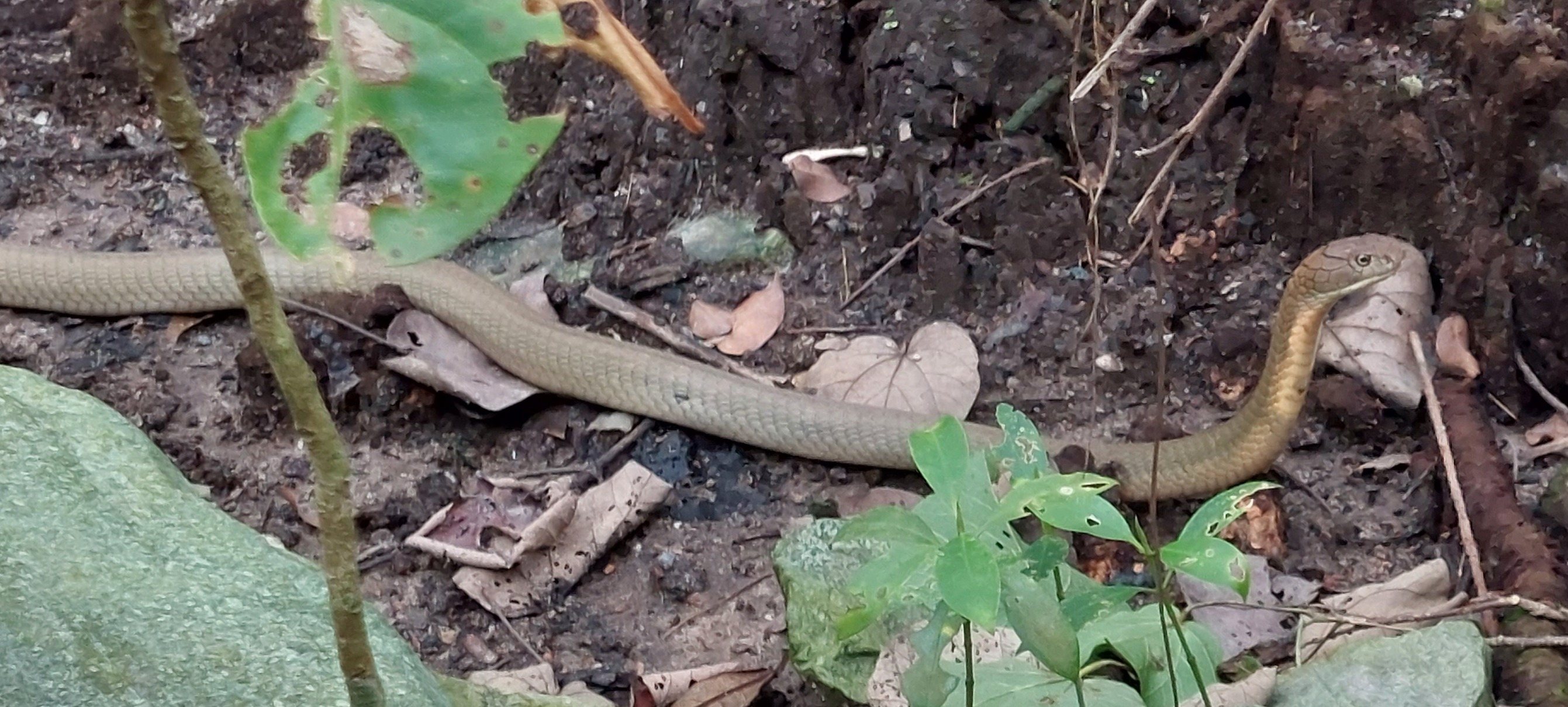
This king cobra (Ophiophagus hannah) was about 2.3 meters long and was hunting in the mangrove forests of Sungei Buloh Wetland Reserve around 2pm. It momentarily raised its head and stood motionless for about a minute.

- Malayan krait (Bungarus candidus) - indeterminate
- Banded krait (Bungarus fasciatus)
- Blue Malayan coral snake (Calliophis bivirgatus)
- Spotted Malayan coral snake (Calliophis gracilis) - indeterminate
- Banded Malayan coral snake (Calliophis intestinalis)
- Equatorial spitting cobra (Naja sumatrana) - common and widespread
- King cobra (Ophiophagus bungarus)
- Yellow-lipped sea krait (Laticauda colubrina) - Singapore Strait
- Marbled sea snake (Aipysurus eydouxii) - Straits of Johor
- Short sea snake (Hydrophis curtus)
- Blue-banded sea snake (Hydrophis cyanocinctus)
- Striped sea snake (Hydrophis fasciatus)
- Small-headed sea snake (Hydrophis gracilis)
- Kloss' sea snake (Hydrophis klossi)
- Horned sea snake (Hydrophis peronii)
- Yellow-bellied sea snake (Hydrophis platurus)
- Beaked sea snake (Hydrophis schistosus)
- Stoke's sea snake (Hydrophis stokesii)

==== Family Pareidae (slug-eating snakes) ====
- White-spotted slug snake (Pareas margaritophorus) - introduced
- Smooth slug snake (Asthenodipsas laevis) - Central Catchment Nature Reserve

==== Family Viperidae (vipers) ====
- Mangrove pit-viper (Trimeresurus purpureomaculatus) - Sungei Buloh Wetland Reserve, Pasir Ris, Pulau Ubin, Pulau Semakau
- Hagen's pit-viper (Trimeresurus hageni) - indeterminate
- Wagler's pit-viper (Tropidolaemus wagleri) - Bukit Timah Nature Reserve, Central Catchment Nature Reserve, Pulau Tekong, individuals seen at Lim Chu Kang and Admiralty Park

=== Order Testudines (turtles, tortoises, terrapins) ===
==== Family Cheloniidae (sea turtles) ====
- Loggerhead turtle (Caretta caretta) - vagrant, confiscated individuals released at Sentosa
- Green turtle (Chelonia mydas) - Singapore Strait
- Hawksbill turtle (Eretmochelys imbricata) - Singapore Strait, recorded nesting on East Coast and Southern Islands
- Olive ridley turtle (Lepidochelys olivacea) - confiscated individuals released at Sentosa, carcass found at East Coast

==== Family Dermochelyidae (leatherback turtle) ====
- Leatherback turtle (Dermochelys coriacea) - vagrant

==== Family Chelydridae (snapping turtles) ====
- Common snapping turtle (Chelydra serpentina sensu lato) - escapee
- Alligator snapping turtle (Macrochelys temminckii sensu lato) - escapee

==== Family Kinosternidae (mud turtles) ====
- Razor-backed musk turtle (Sternotherus carinatus) - escapee

==== Family Trionychidae (softshell turtles) ====
- Asiatic softshell turtle (Amyda cartilaginea) - Central Catchment Nature Reserve, populations elsewhere likely to be escapees or introduced
- Southeast Asian softshell turtle (Amyda ornata) - introduced
- Forest softshell turtle (Dogania subplana) - Central Catchment Nature Reserve
- Indian flapshell turtle (Lissemys punctata) - escapee
- Wattle-necked softshell turtle (Palea steindachneri) - escapee
- Asian giant softshell turtle (Pelochelys cantorii) - indeterminate
- Chinese softshell turtle (Pelodiscus sinensis sensu lato) - introduced

==== Family Carettochelyidae (pig-nosed turtle) ====
- Pig-nosed turtle (Carettochelys insculpta) - escapee

==== Family Geoemydidae (Asian terrapins) ====
- Southern river terrapin (Batagur affinis) - likely former native but since extirpated, recent local records likely to be escapees
- Painted terrapin (Batagur borneoensis) - indeterminate, recent local records likely to be escapees
- Malayan box terrapin (Cuora amboinensis) - local populations likely to be a mixture of native and introduced individuals
- Asian leaf terrapin (Cyclemys dentata) - Central Catchment Nature Reserve, Western Catchment
- Giant Asian pond terrapin (Heosemys grandis) - introduced
- Spiny terrapin (Heosemys spinosa) - Bukit Timah Nature Reserve, Central Catchment Nature Reserve
- Chinese stripe-necked turtle (Mauremys sinensis) - escapee
- Malayan flat-shelled terrapin (Notochelys platynota) - Central Catchment Nature Reserve, Western Catchment
- Malayan giant terrapin (Orlitia borneensis) - indeterminate, recent local records likely to be escapees
- Black marsh terrapin (Siebenrockiella crassicollis) - likely introduced

==== Family Testudinidae (tortoises) ====
- Asian brown tortoise (Manouria emys) - escapee
- Indian star tortoise (Geochelone elegans) - escapee

==== Family Emydidae (American terrapins) ====
- Cuban slider (Trachemys decussata) - escapee
- Red-eared slider (Trachemys scripta elegans) - introduced, common and widespread
- Florida cooter (Pseudemys concinna floridana) - escapee

==== Family Podocnemididae (side-necked turtles) ====
- Yellow-spotted river turtle (Podocnemis unifilis) - escapee

==== Family Chelidae (side-necked turtles) ====
- Matamata (Chelus fimbriata) - escapee

== See also ==
- List of mammals of Singapore
- List of birds of Singapore
- List of amphibians of Singapore
