= Xenochrophis bellulus =

Conservation status
- Data Deficient (IUCN 3.1)

Scientific classification
- Kingdom: Animalia
- Phylum: Chordata
- Class: Reptilia
- Order: Squamata
- Suborder: Serpentes
- Family: Colubridae
- Genus: Xenochrophis
- Species: X. bellulus

Binomial name
- Xenochrophis bellulus (Stoliczka, 1871)

Species of snake

Xenochrophis bellulus, the Burmese keelback water snake or Burmese white-barred keelback , is a species of water snake described by Stoliczka in 1871. It is known only from three examples collected in Myanmar, including a recent specimen from 2010.

== Description ==
The Burmese keelback water snake is relatively small in size, and grow to a maximal length of between 4 and 6 centimetres. The body is elongated with a moderately long tail, and is covered by keeled scales on the dorsal section.

== Distribution and habitat ==
The species is endemic to Myanmar, and is believed to have an extensive habitat extending across the interior of the country. The snake has been known to frequent wetlands and freshwater streams surrounding the Irrawaddy River floodplain, designating it as both terrestrial and aquatic, and is therefore believed to be extant at a low altitude.

== Behaviour ==
Due to status as a water snake, it is believed to be semi-aquatic, inhabiting both wetlands and river systems. The species is believed to be non-venomous, but due to a lack of encounters this has not been confirmed by herpetologists to date. If this hypothesis is proved correct, it is likely the bite of the snake would only cause mild swelling and localised pain.

== Population ==
At present, the population of the species is unclear due to the wide range of their habitat, and size and trends are currently unable to be determined. However, the snake is known to be rare, as only a single specimen was discovered in 2010 during a twelve-year survey in Myanmar.

== Threats ==
The area surrounding the Irrawaddy River has undergone intensive deforestation and land conversion for cultivation and agriculture. The extent of the impact upon the species, if any, remains unknown despite the continuance of the changing nature of the landscape.
