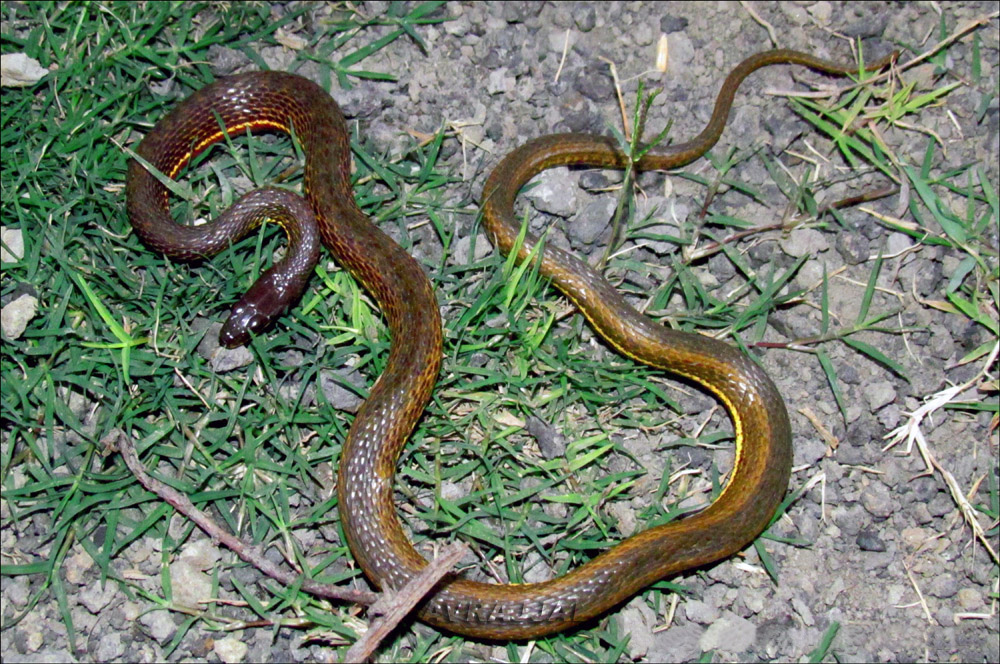
- Adult from Kolkata

Scientific classification
- Kingdom: Animalia
- Phylum: Chordata
- Class: Reptilia
- Order: Squamata
- Suborder: Serpentes
- Family: Colubridae
- Genus: Xenochrophis
- Species: X. cerasogaster

Binomial name
- Xenochrophis cerasogaster (Cantor, 1839)

Synonyms
- Psammophis cerasogaster

= Xenochrophis cerasogaster =

Painted keelback

Species of snake

The painted keelback (Xenochrophis cerasogaster) is a species of colubrid snake found in Pakistan, Nepal, Bangladesh, and India (Assam, Uttar Pradesh, West Bengal). This snake is sometimes called the dark-bellied marsh snake.

== Description ==
See snake scales for terminology

In this species, the head is narrow and elongated, with an angular canthus rostralis and slightly concave lores; the eyes are moderate or rather small. The rostral is 1.5 to 3.0 times as broad as it is long; the suture between the internasals is nearly as long as that between the prefrontals; the frontal is much longer than its distance from the end of the snout, as long as the parietals; the lorealae are as long as deep or a little longer, It has one preocular, two or three postoculars, and one or two suboculars; the temporals number 2+2 or 2+3. It has 9 upper labials, with the fourth (rarely fifth) entering the eye; the five or six lower labials are in contact with the anterior chin shields, which are about as long as the posterior. Its scales are strongly keeled, in 19 rows, with 140-151 ventral scales; the anal scale is divided; the subcaudals are 60–70 in number.

This snake is brown above, with or without darker spots and with a more or less distinct paler dorsolateral band. The lower parts are cherry-red to purplish-black, with a yellow band on each side extending from the lips to the end of the tail. Total length is two feet, and the tail is 5.5 inches.

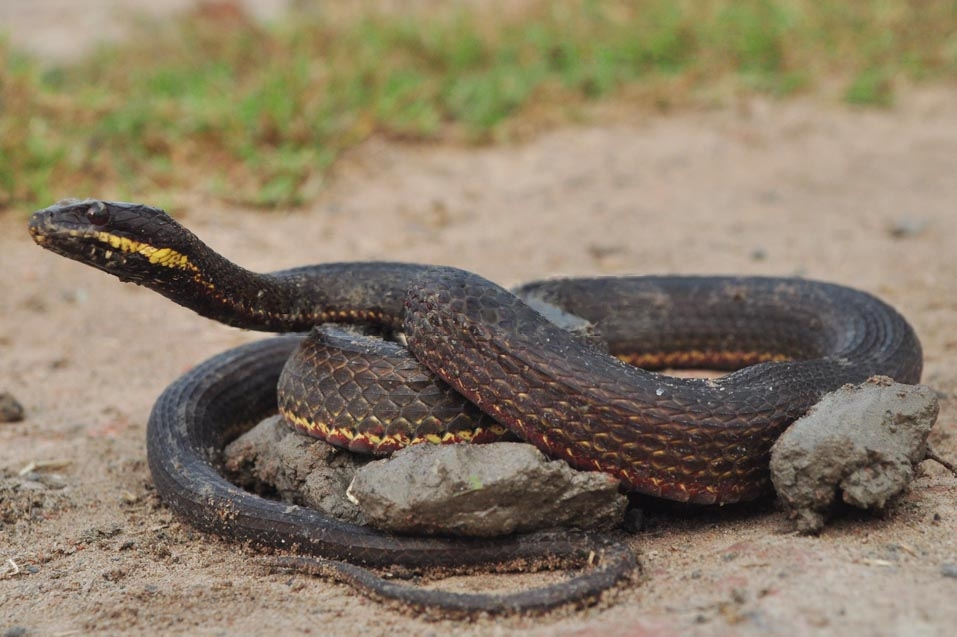
Kolkata, West Bengal (India)

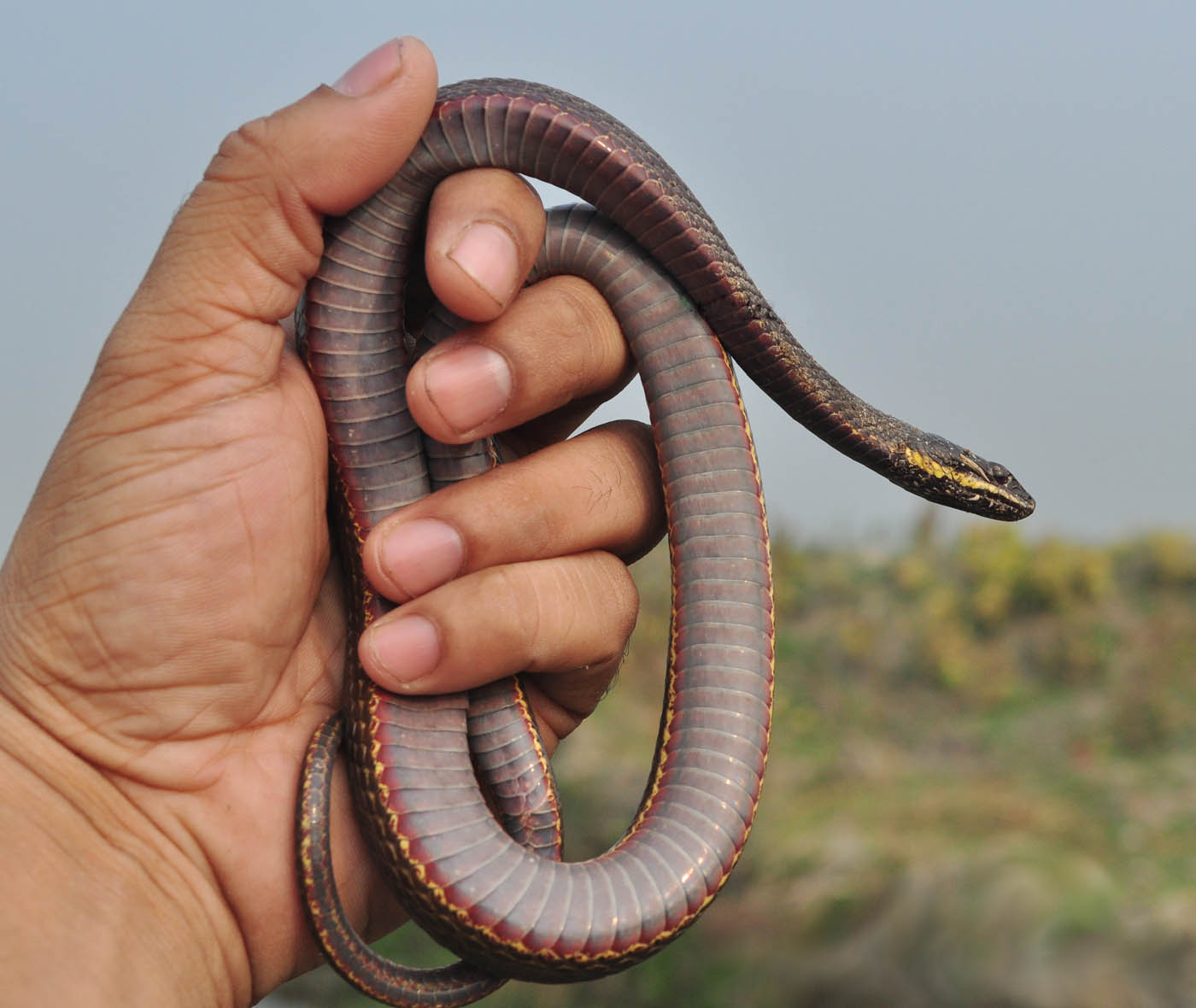
Painted keelback

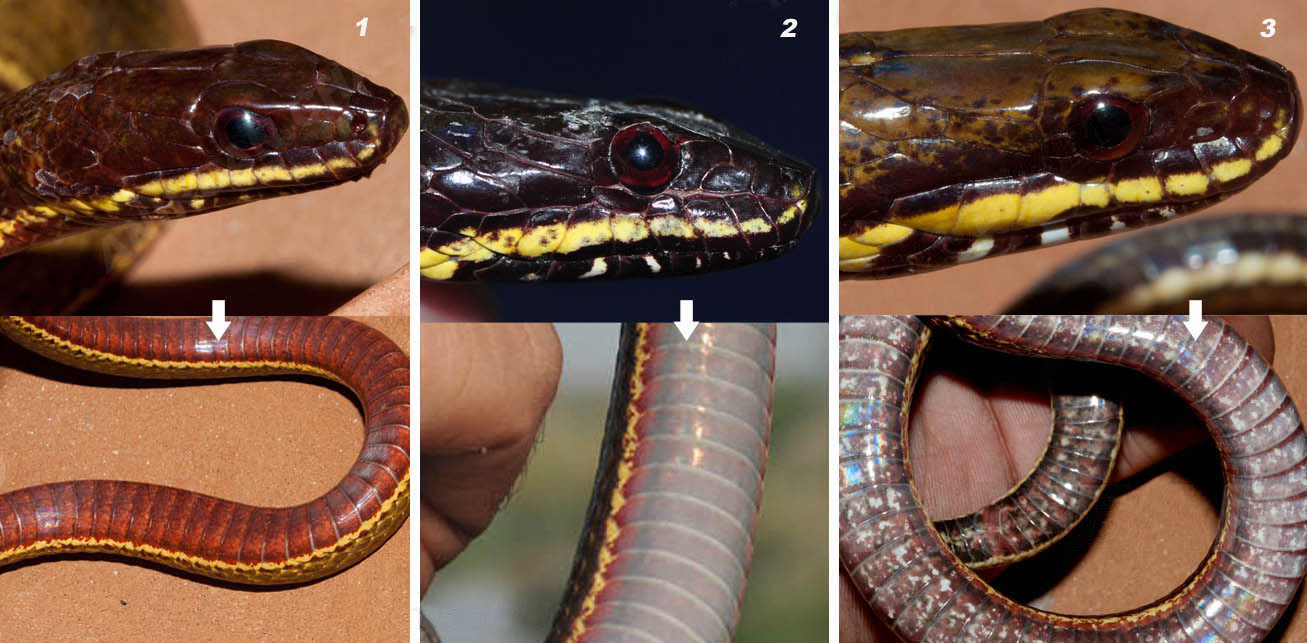

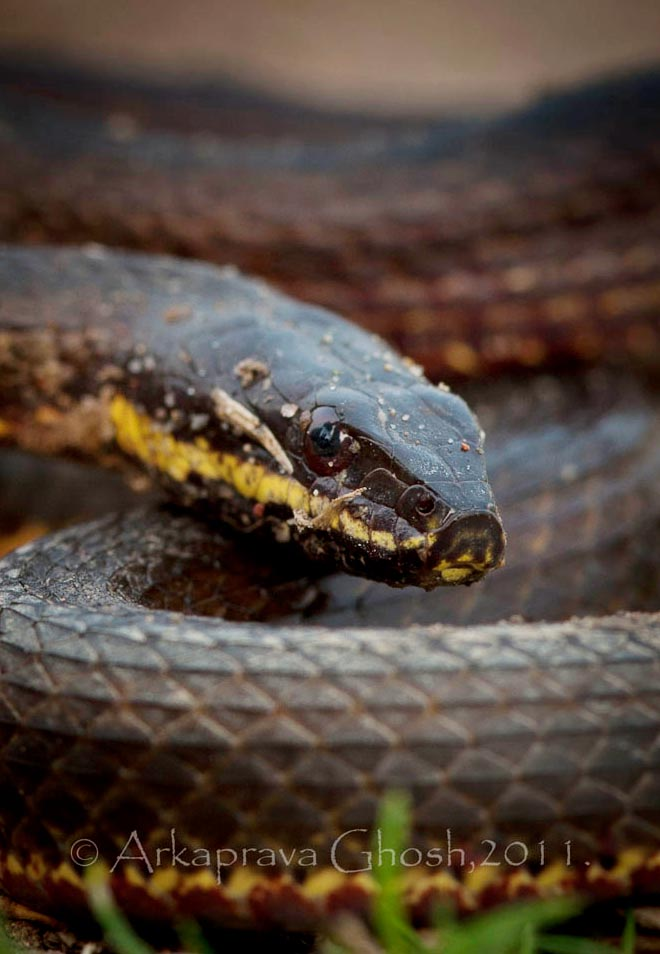

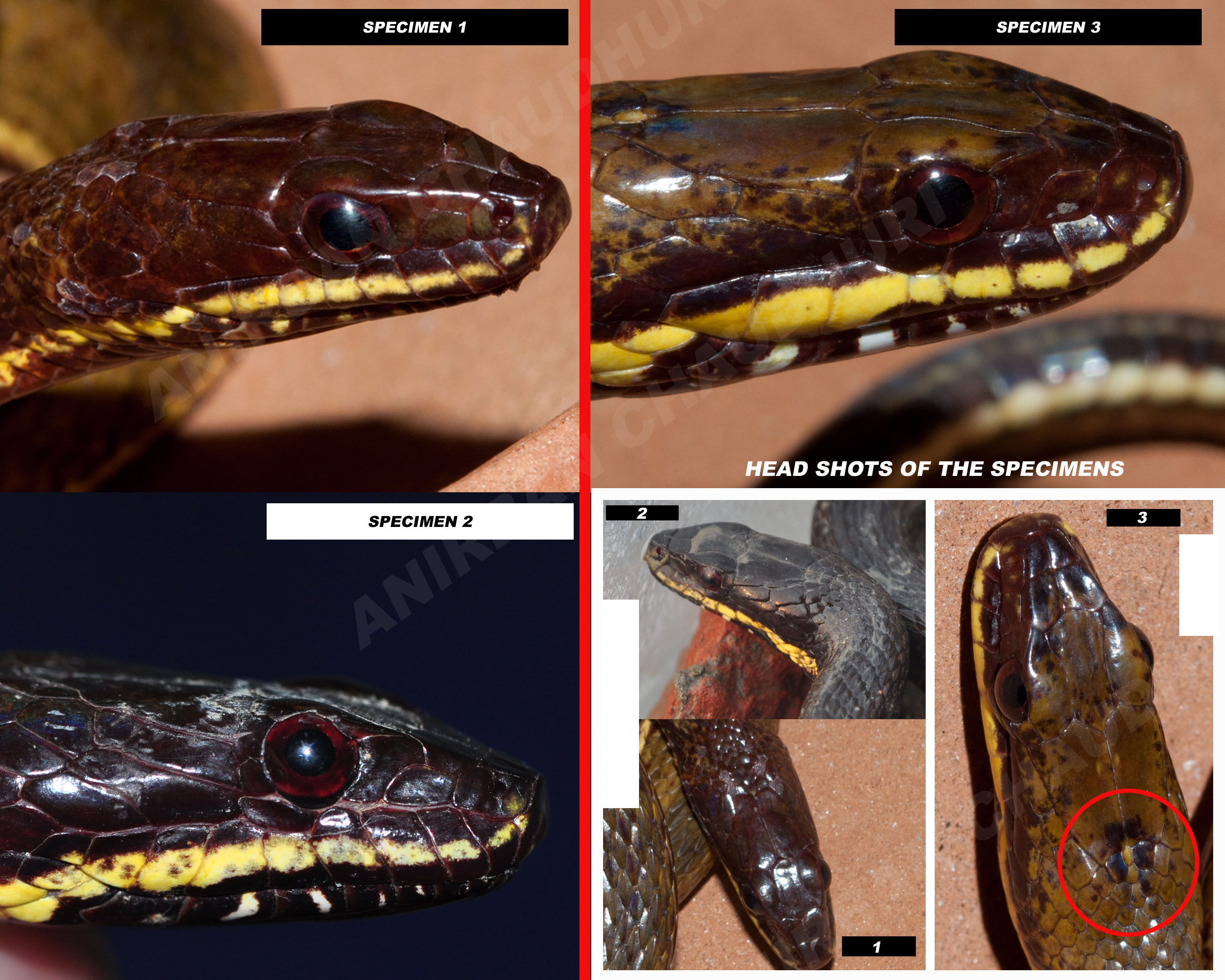

== See also ==
- The Fauna of British India, including Ceylon and Burma
