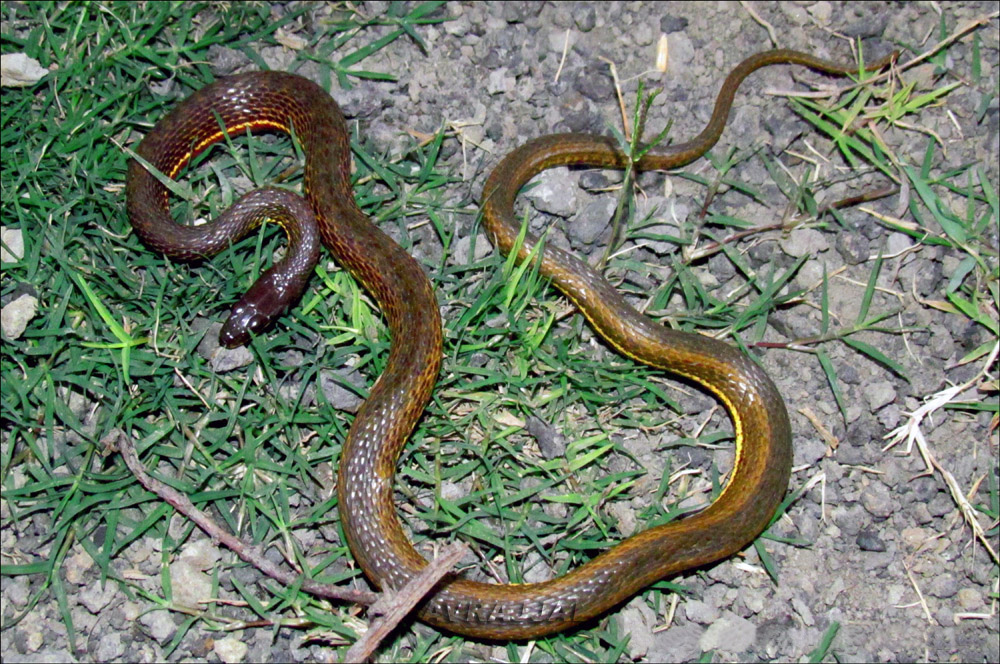
- Painted keelback (Xenochrophis cerasogaster)

Scientific classification
- Kingdom: Animalia
- Phylum: Chordata
- Class: Reptilia
- Order: Squamata
- Suborder: Serpentes
- Family: Colubridae
- Subfamily: Natricinae
- Genus: Xenochrophis; Günther, 1864

Species
- 5, see text.

= Xenochrophis =

Genus of snakes

Xenochrophis is a genus of snakes in the subfamily Natricinae of the family Colubridae. The genus is endemic to Asia. Some members have been moved to the genus Fowlea.

== Etymology ==
The generic nomen Xenochrophis is presumably derived from the Greek xénos, meaning foreign, strange; chros, meaning color; and ophis, meaning snake. The generic nomen probably refers to the distinctive color pattern of this type species. The gender of this generic name is masculine.

== Species of Xenochrophis ==
The following species are recognized as being valid.

Image	Scientific name	Common name	Distribution
	Xenochrophis bellulus (Stoliczka, 1871)	Burmese keelback water snake, Burmese white-barred keelback	Myanmar
	Xenochrophis cerasogaster (Cantor, 1839)	painted keelback	Pakistan, Nepal, Bangladesh, and India (Assam, Uttar Pradesh, West Bengal:- Kolkata).
	Xenochrophis maculatus (Edeling, 1864)	spotted keelback	Indonesia, Malaysia, Brunei and Singapore.
	Xenochrophis trianguligerus (F. Boie, 1827)	triangle keelback	Brunei Darussalam, Burma (Myanmar), Cambodia, India (Nicobar Islands; Arunachal Pradesh (Deban - Changlang district)), Indonesia (Nias, Mentawai, Sumatra, Laos, Malaysia (Malaya and East Malaysia), Singapore, Thailand, and Vietnam.
	Xenochrophis vittatus (Linnaeus, 1758)	banded keelback, striped keelback	Indonesia (Bangka, Java, Sumatra, We, Sulawesi) and Singapore
