= Xenelaphis ellipsifer =

Conservation status
- Least Concern (IUCN 3.1)

Scientific classification
- Kingdom: Animalia
- Phylum: Chordata
- Class: Reptilia
- Order: Squamata
- Suborder: Serpentes
- Family: Colubridae
- Genus: Xenelaphis
- Species: X. ellipsifer

Binomial name
- Xenelaphis ellipsifer Boulenger, 1900

Species of snake

Xenelaphis ellipsifer, the ornate brown snake, or ocellated brown snake, is a large species of snake, up to 2.5 m (8 ft 2 in) long, which is found in Malaysia and Indonesia. It has a rounded snout, its head is distinct from its neck, and it has protruding large round eyes. The top of the snake (the dorsum) is orange-red in color, and along the sides of its body are large black-edged squarish brown blotches separated by cream colored spaces. It has a yellow upper lip. X. ellipsifer is an aquatic species, found in forests at 800–1,000 m (2,600–3,300 ft) above sea level.

The first description of this snake was published in 1900 by George Albert Boulenger, who found a single specimen in a fish trap above the Sarawak River in Malaysia. This snake became the type specimen of the species, and is held at the British Museum in London. Although this is a rare snake which has been described in few published reports, it is classified on the IUCN Red List as a species of least concern, since it is widely distributed in protected areas, and is therefore not under threat.
