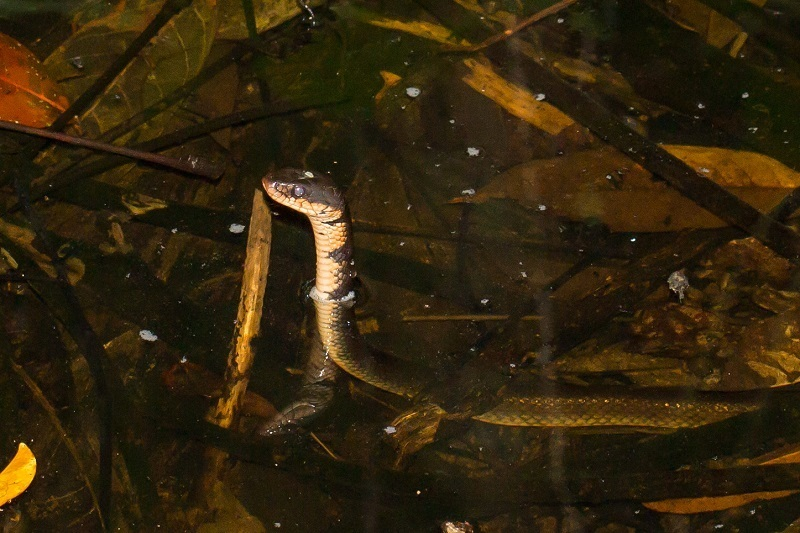
- X. hexagonotus in Sarawak, Malaysia

Scientific classification
- Kingdom: Animalia
- Phylum: Chordata
- Class: Reptilia
- Order: Squamata
- Suborder: Serpentes
- Family: Colubridae
- Subfamily: Colubrinae
- Genus: Xenelaphis; Günther, 1864

= Xenelaphis =

Genus of snakes

Xenelaphis is a genus of snakes of the family Colubridae, which are found in Southeast Asia. There are two species in this genus, the ornate brown snake, Xenelaphis ellipsifer and the more widespread Malayan brown snake, Xenelaphis hexagonotus.

== Species ==
- Xenelaphis ellipsifer Boulenger, 1900
- Xenelaphis hexagonotus (Cantor, 1847)
