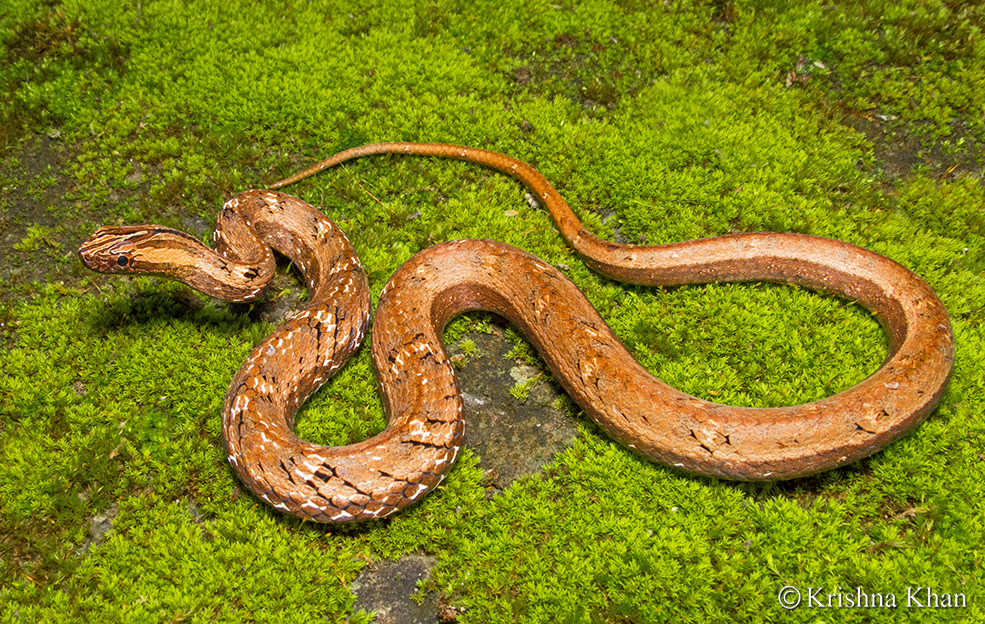
- In Northeast India

Conservation status
- Least Concern (IUCN 3.1)

Scientific classification
- Kingdom: Animalia
- Phylum: Chordata
- Class: Reptilia
- Order: Squamata
- Suborder: Serpentes
- Family: Psammodynastidae
- Genus: Psammodynastes
- Species: P. pulverulentus

Binomial name
- Psammodynastes pulverulentus (H. Boie in F. Boie, 1827)

Synonyms
- Psammophis pulverulenta Boie, 1827

= Psammodynastes pulverulentus =

Species of snake

Psammodynastes pulverulentus, the common mock viper, is a species of snake native to Asia.

It is a small snake (total length up to 65 cm (26 in), less in males), and it will form defensive coils and strike in a viper-like fashion when threatened, although it is harmless to humans.

== Distribution ==
The common mock viper is known from Bangladesh, Myanmar (Burma), Cambodia, China (Fujian, Yunnan, Guangxi, Guangdong, Hainan, Hong Kong), north-eastern India (Assam, Sikkim, Darjeeling; Jalpaiguri; Meghalaya, Arunachal Pradesh), Bhutan, Indonesia (Bali, Bangka, Borneo, Butung, Enggano, Flores, Java, Kalimantan, Komodo, Lombok, Mentawai Archipelago, Natuna Archipelago, Padar, Riau Archipelago, Rinca, Sangihe Archipelago, Sulawesi, Sula Archipelago, Sumatra, Sumba, Sumbawa, Togian Archipelago), Laos, Malaysia (Malaya and East Malaysia, Pulau Tioman), Nepal, the Philippines (Balabac, Basilan, Bohol, Bongao, Busuanga, Dinagat, Jolo, Leyte, Luzon, Mindanao, Negros, Palawan, Panay, Polillo, Samar), Taiwan, Thailand (incl. Phuket), and Vietnam. It has been reported from Singapore.

Subspecies Psammodynastes pulverulentus papenfussi is endemic to Taiwan.

== Gallery ==
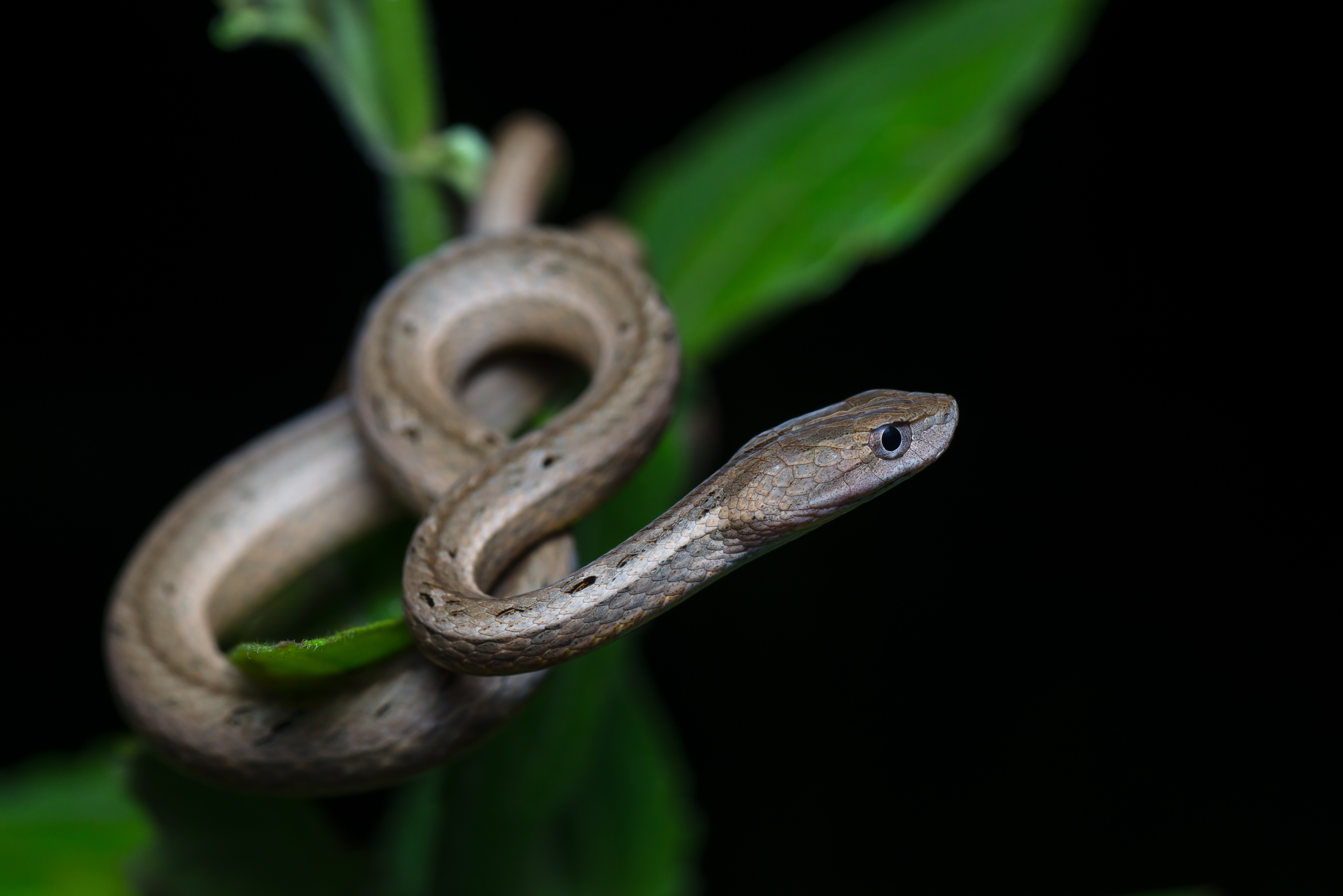
In Nam Nao National Park, Thailand

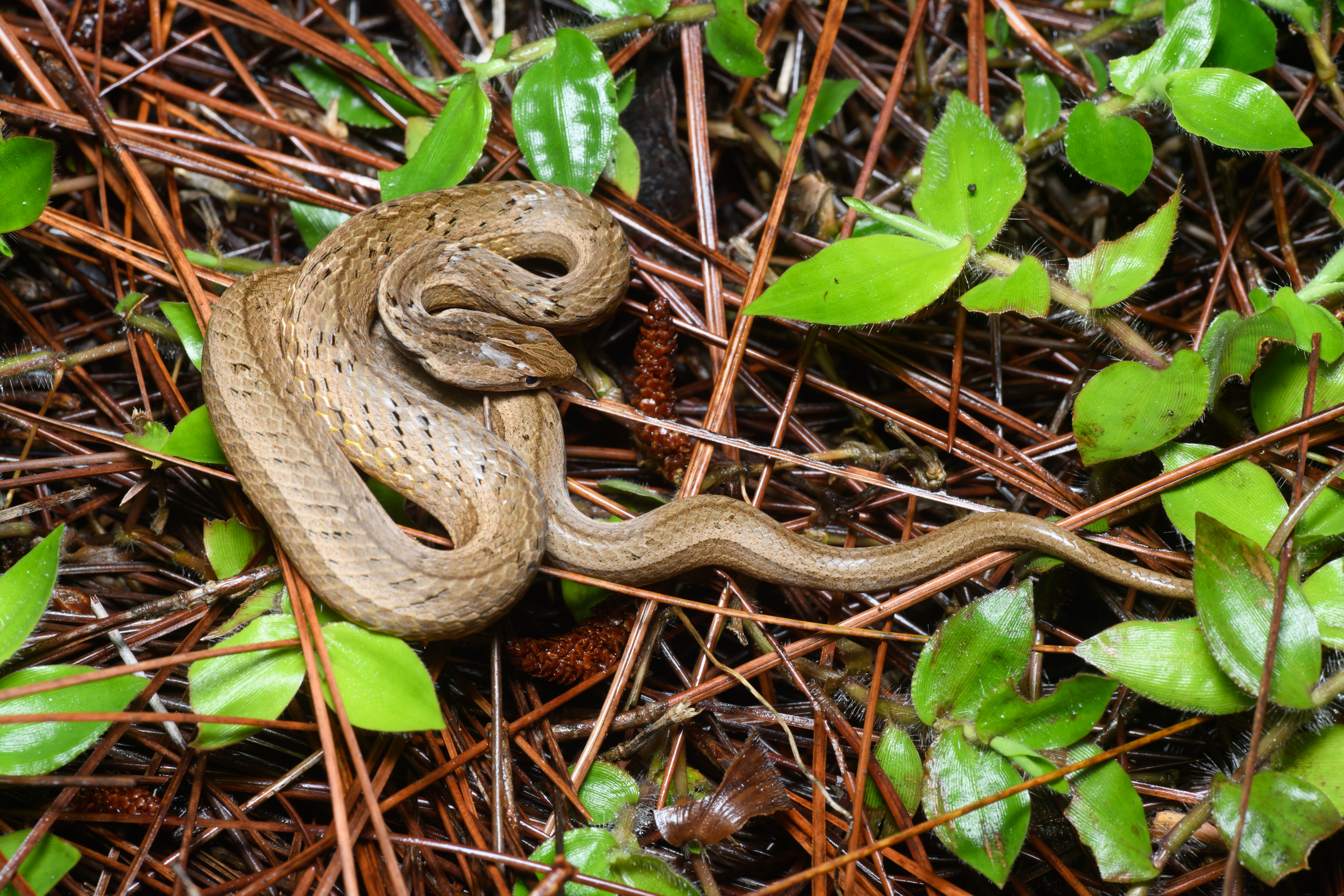
In Phu Kradueng National Park, Thailand

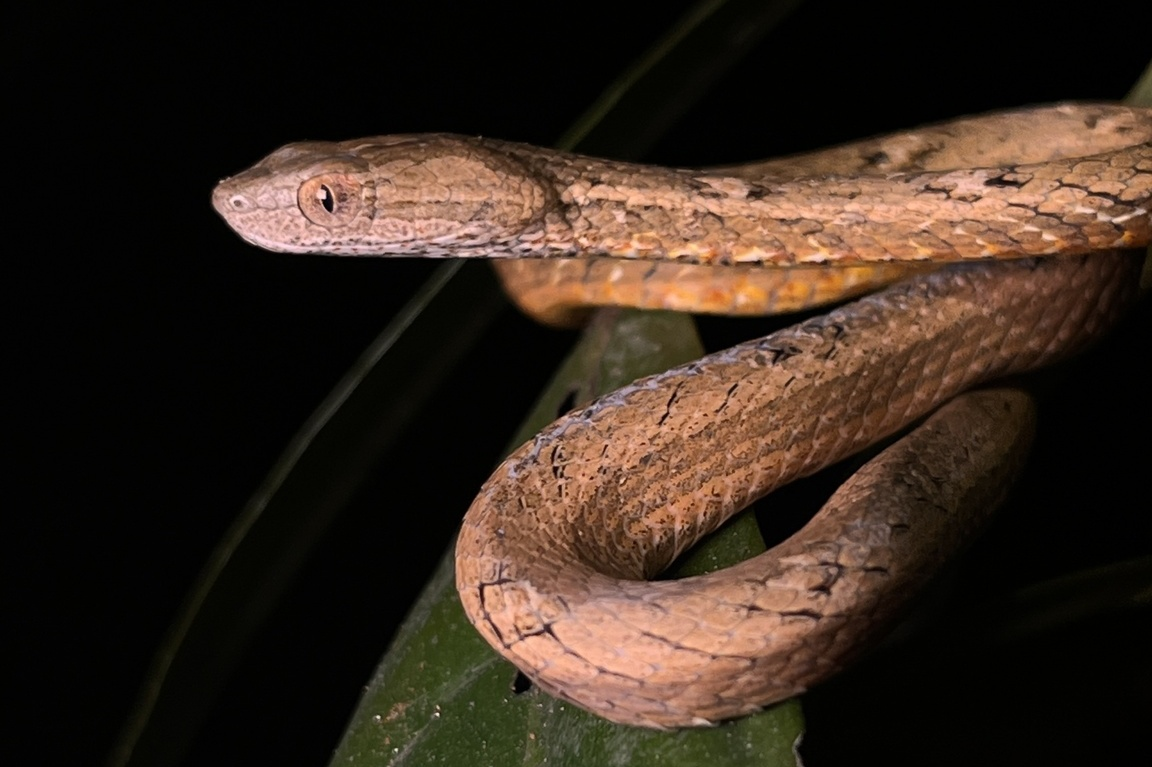
In Vietnam
