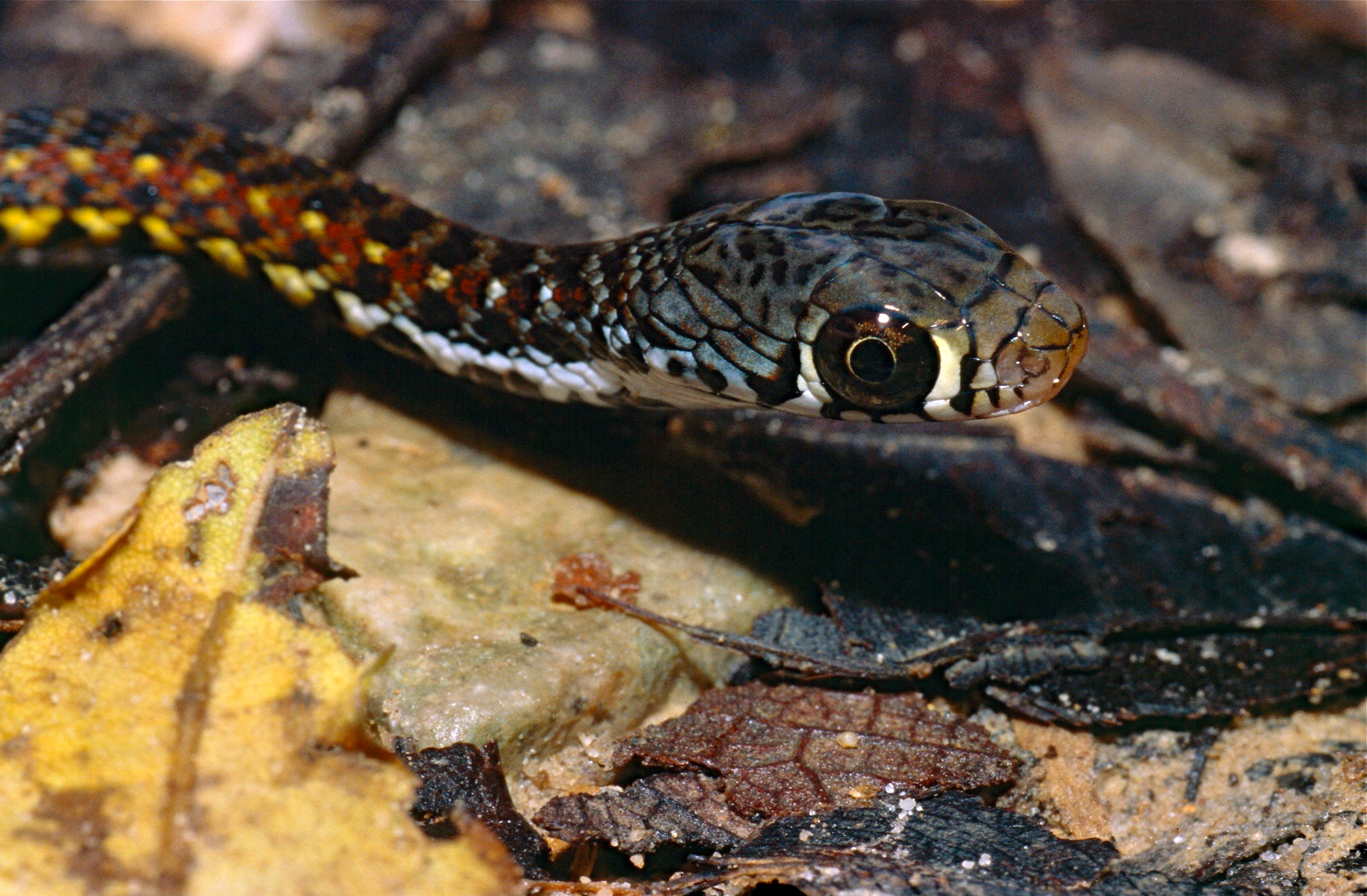
- Juvenile

Conservation status
- Least Concern (IUCN 3.1)

Scientific classification
- Kingdom: Animalia
- Phylum: Chordata
- Class: Reptilia
- Order: Squamata
- Suborder: Serpentes
- Family: Colubridae
- Genus: Xenochrophis
- Species: X. maculatus

Binomial name
- Xenochrophis maculatus (Edeling, 1864)

= Xenochrophis maculatus =

Species of snake

The spotted keelback (Xenochrophis maculatus) is a species of snake of the family Colubridae.

== Geographic range ==
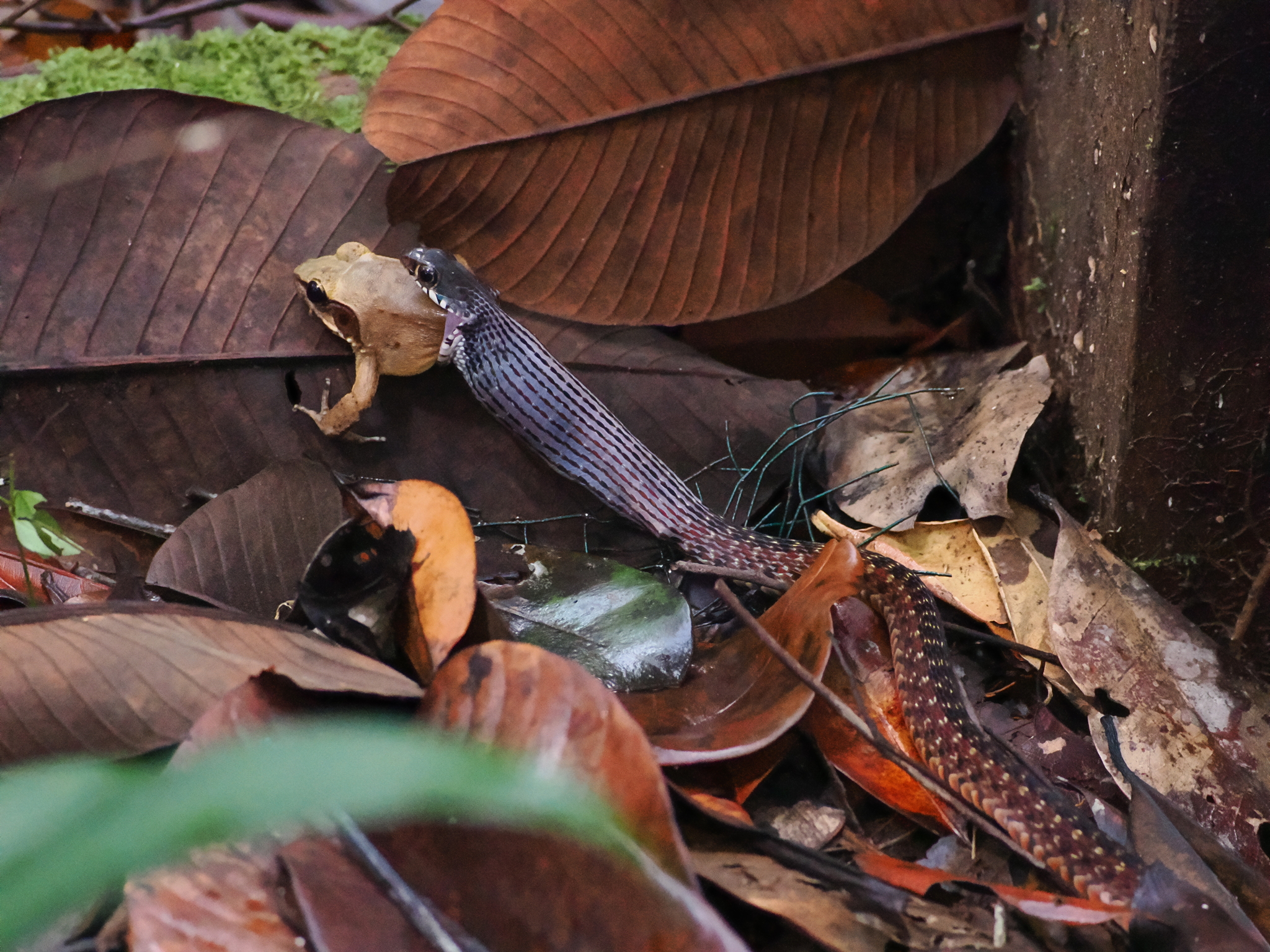
Eating a frog, in Indonesia

The snake is found in Indonesia, Malaysia, Brunei and Singapore.
