= Cnemaspis peninsularis =

Scientific classification
- Kingdom: Animalia
- Phylum: Chordata
- Class: Reptilia
- Order: Squamata
- Suborder: Gekkota
- Family: Gekkonidae
- Genus: Cnemaspis
- Species: C. peninsularis

Binomial name
- Cnemaspis peninsularis Grismer et al., 2014

Species of gecko

Cnemaspis peninsularis, also known as the peninsular rock gecko, is a species of gecko from southern Peninsular Malaysia and Singapore.
