= Cyrtodactylus majulah =

Scientific classification
- Kingdom: Animalia
- Phylum: Chordata
- Class: Reptilia
- Order: Squamata
- Suborder: Gekkota
- Family: Gekkonidae
- Genus: Cyrtodactylus
- Species: C. majulah

Binomial name
- Cyrtodactylus majulah Grismer, Wood, & Lim, 2012

Species of lizard

Cyrtodactylus majulah is a species of gecko that is found in Singapore and Indonesia.
