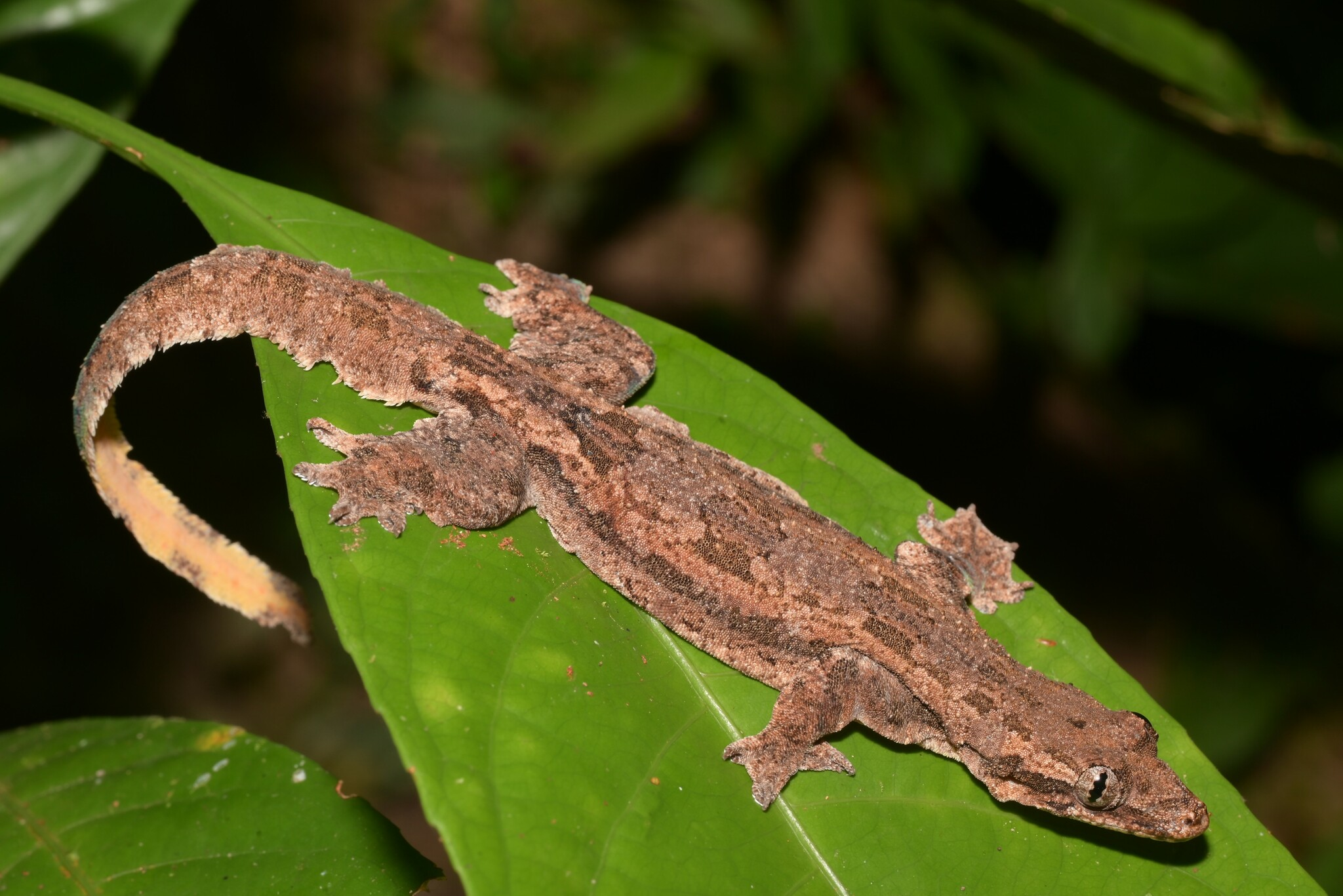

Conservation status
- Least Concern (IUCN 3.1)

Scientific classification
- Kingdom: Animalia
- Phylum: Chordata
- Class: Reptilia
- Order: Squamata
- Suborder: Gekkota
- Family: Gekkonidae
- Genus: Hemidactylus
- Species: H. craspedotus

Binomial name
- Hemidactylus craspedotus Mocquard, 1890

Synonyms
- Cosymbotus craspedotus; Mimetozoon craspedotus; Mimetozoon floweri; Platyurus craspedotus

= Hemidactylus craspedotus =

Species of lizard

Hemidactylus craspedotus, also known as Mocquard's house gecko, frilled gecko, or frilly house gecko, is a species of gecko. It is found in southeast Asia: Malay Peninsula (southern Thailand, Peninsular Malaysia, and Singapore), Tioman Island, Sumatra, and Borneo.
