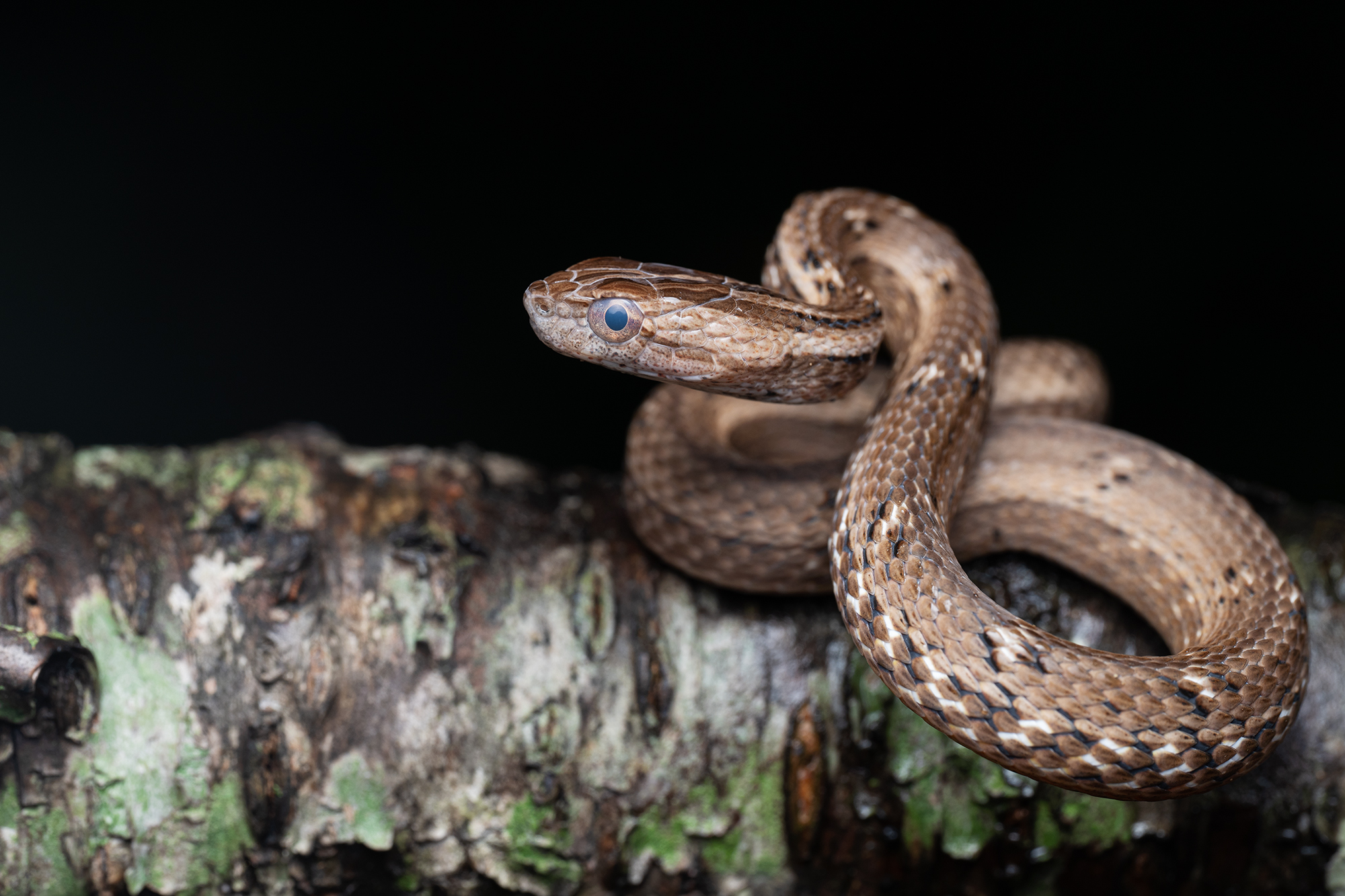
- Psammodynastes pulverulentus

Scientific classification
- Kingdom: Animalia
- Phylum: Chordata
- Order: Squamata
- Suborder: Serpentes
- Superfamily: Elapoidea
- Family: Psammodynastidae; Das et al., 2024
- Genus: Psammodynastes; Günther, 1858

Species
- P. pictus Günther, 1858; P. pulverulentus (Boie, 1827)

Synonyms
- Psammodynastiinae Hoser, 2013

= Psammodynastes =

Genus of snakes

Psammodynastes is a genus of elapoid snakes, containing two species native to tropical and subtropical Asia. It is the only member of the family Psammodynastidae. They are also known as mock vipers due to their superficial resemblance to true vipers. Their Batesian mimicry of vipers extends to them having a fake venom fang at the front of the mouth revealed during threat displays, although they are actually rear-fanged snakes with weak venom meant for small animals.

It was formerly placed in the family Pseudaspididae (alternatively the subfamily Pseudaspidinae of Lamprophiidae), which otherwise contains two monotypic snake genera native to Africa. However, more recent studies have found it to represent a basal member of the Elapoidea, more derived than Cyclocoridae but sister to the rest of the expansive group. It is thought to have diverged from the rest of the group during the early-mid Eocene.

Although both species in this genus co-occur in parts of Indonesia, they occupy different habitats, with P. pictus appearing to be significantly more dependent on aquatic habitats and having piscivorous tendencies. Meanwhile, P. pulverulentus appears to be a specialist skink predator.

== Species ==
- Psammodynastes pictus Günther, 1858—painted mock viper
- Psammodynastes pulverulentus (Boie, 1827)—common mock viper
