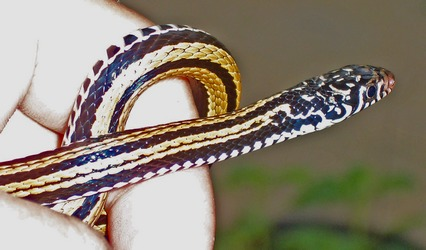
- Xenochrophis vittatus from Central Java

Conservation status
- Least Concern (IUCN 3.1)

Scientific classification
- Kingdom: Animalia
- Phylum: Chordata
- Class: Reptilia
- Order: Squamata
- Suborder: Serpentes
- Family: Colubridae
- Genus: Xenochrophis
- Species: X. vittatus

Binomial name
- Xenochrophis vittatus (Linnaeus, 1758)

Synonyms
- Coluber vittatus Linnaeus, 1758; Natrix vittata Laurenti, 1768; Tropidonotus vittatus Boie, 1827; Fowlea vittata Malnate, 1960; Xenochrophis vittata Malnate & Minton, 1965

= Striped keelback =

Species of snake

The striped keelback (Xenochrophis vittatus) is a species of colubrid snake native to Indonesia. It has also been introduced to Singapore and Puerto Rico.

== Description ==
The striped keelback is a medium sized snake, with females growing to about 70 cm in length and males reaching 50 cm. They are noticeably thin and are colored bronze with black stripes running down the top and sides of the body. The chin and ventral areas of this snake is barred black and white.

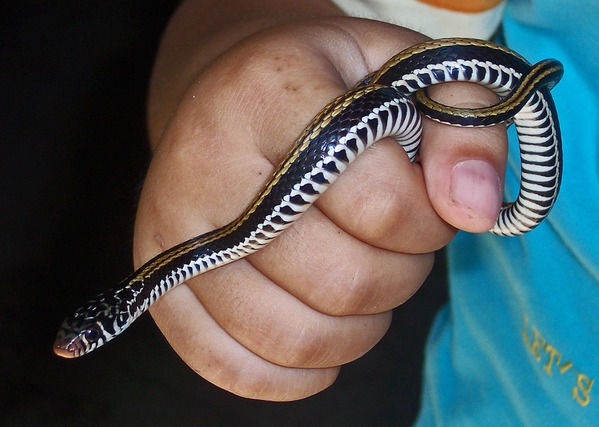
Striped keelback from Banyumas, Central Java, Indonesia

== Distribution ==
The native range of this snake is the western parts of Indonesia, mostly Sumatra and Java. Boulenger reported this species in Sulawesi, but as this was in 1897 and no other records have been made it is likely this snake is not found there.

They have been introduced to Singapore, with the first record in July 1982 at Pandan Gardens. It was first recorded in western Singapore, but has since spread to the eastern parts of the island where it can be found around beaches and mangrove swamps. The white-throated kingfisher has been observed to eat these snakes in Singapore.

This species was first documented from Puerto Rico in 2011 when two adult snakes were found under a steel panel in Toa Baja. It has since been sighted many times in the northeastern part of the island in lowland grassy fields and wetlands. Several specimens had their stomachs examined and were found to have eaten coquis and white-lipped frogs.

== Ecology ==
This is a diurnal snake that is found in and around aquatic habitats such as ponds, wetlands, and paddies. They also live in open habitats such as fields and meadows. The striped keelback is rear-fanged and mildly venomous, but is considered harmless to humans.

Their diet consists of small animals such as fish, amphibians, and lizards. It is oviparous and lays 5 to 12 eggs in a clutch. Hatchlings are about 13 cm in length. They live for approximately 10 years.
