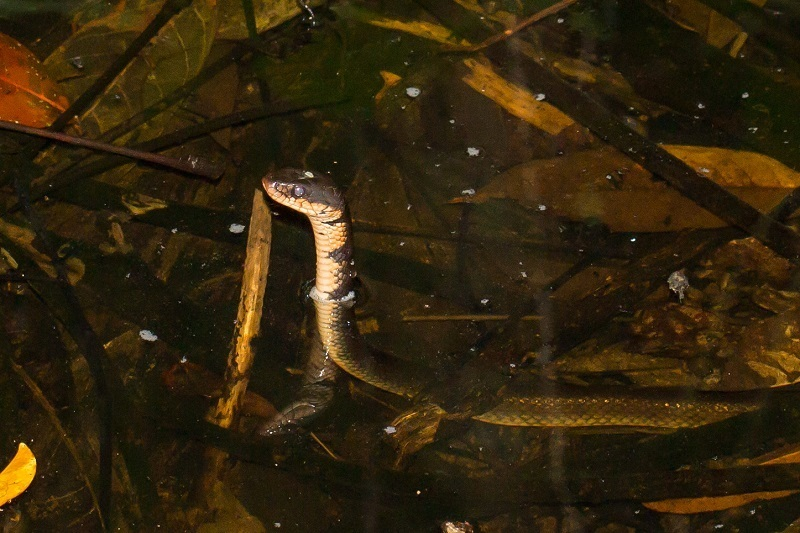

Conservation status
- Least Concern (IUCN 3.1)

Scientific classification
- Kingdom: Animalia
- Phylum: Chordata
- Class: Reptilia
- Order: Squamata
- Suborder: Serpentes
- Family: Colubridae
- Genus: Xenelaphis
- Species: X. hexagonotus

Binomial name
- Xenelaphis hexagonotus Cantor, 1847

= Xenelaphis hexagonotus =

Species of snake

Xenelaphis hexagonotus, also known as the Malaysian (or Malayan) brown snake, is a species of snake found across Southeast Asia. It reaches up to 2 m (6 ft 7 in) in length. The top of its body (the dorsum) is dark brown, with short black bars along its sides of the front part of the body, and it is white on its belly (the ventrum).

The habitat of X. hexagonotus is lowland waterlogged forests and mangrove swamps, and it is found from sea level up to 200 m (660 ft) above sea level. It is diurnal, and its diet includes rats and fish. It is classified on the IUCN Red List as a species of least concern.
