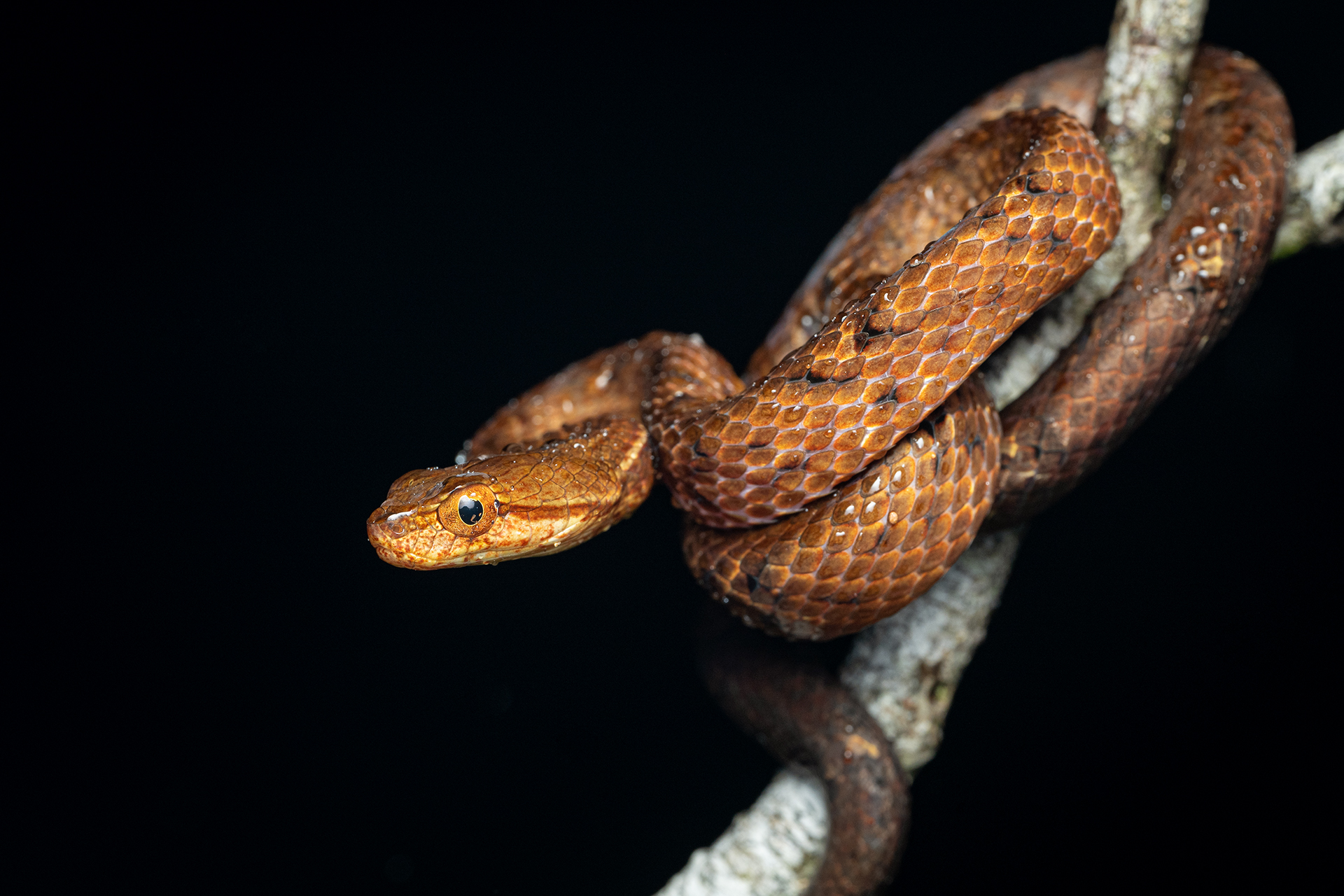

Conservation status
- Least Concern (IUCN 3.1)

Scientific classification
- Kingdom: Animalia
- Phylum: Chordata
- Class: Reptilia
- Order: Squamata
- Suborder: Serpentes
- Family: Psammodynastidae
- Genus: Psammodynastes
- Species: P. pictus

Binomial name
- Psammodynastes pictus Günther, 1858

Synonyms
- Psammophis (Psammodynastes) conjunctus Peters, 1868

= Psammodynastes pictus =

Painted mock viper

Species of snake

Psammodynastes pictus, commonly known as painted mock viper or spotted mock viper, is a species of snake native to Southeast Asia.

== Distribution ==
The type locality for this species is Borneo and (erroneously) India. Within Borneo, it is found in both Brunei, East Malaysia and Kalimantan. This species is also distributed across the Malay Peninsula, including Singapore, and on the islands of Sumatra, Belitung, Bangka, Simeulue, and Riau Archipelago (Indonesia).

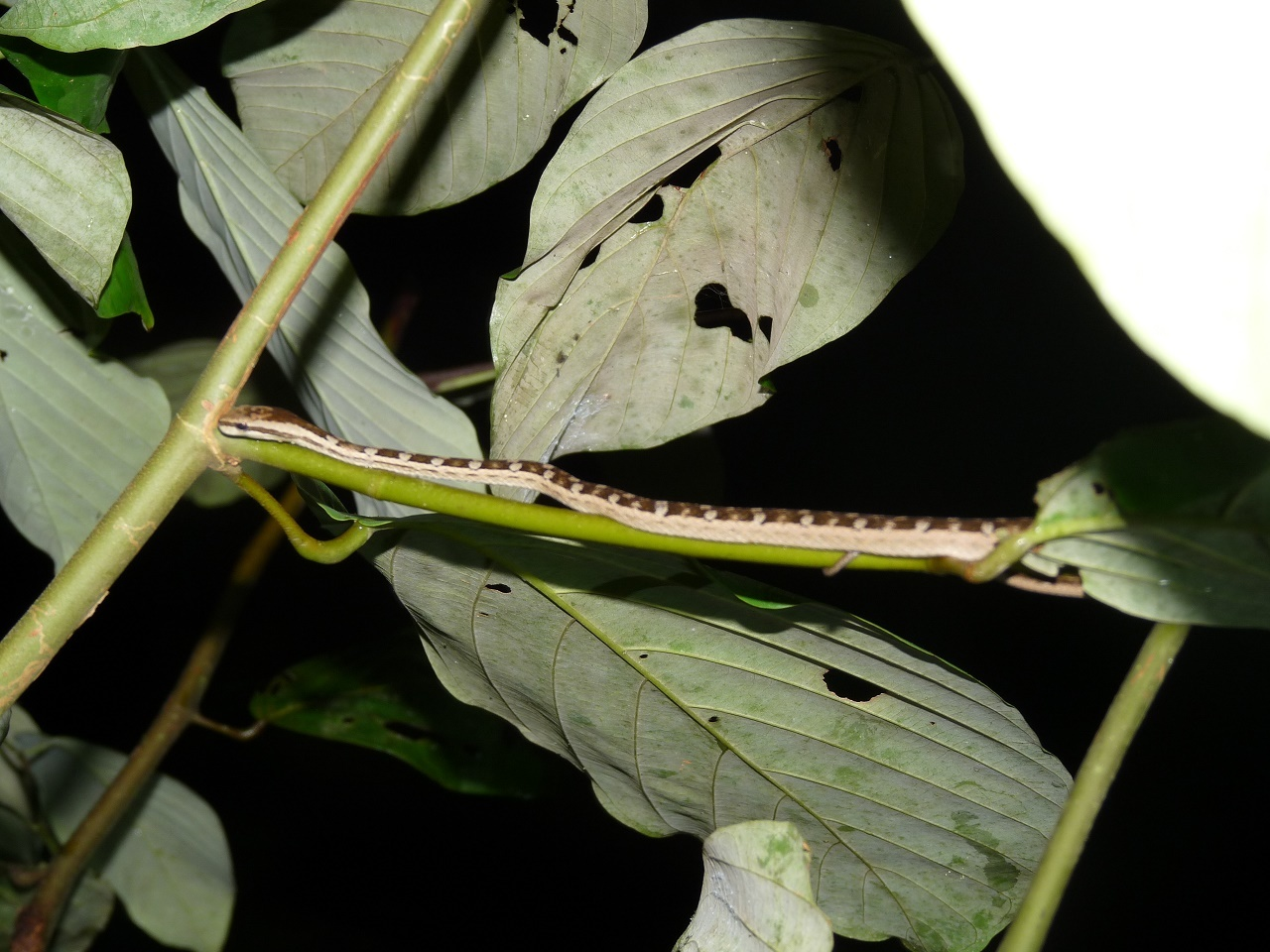
