= Peninsular bent-toed gecko =

Scientific classification
- Kingdom: Animalia
- Phylum: Chordata
- Class: Reptilia
- Order: Squamata
- Suborder: Gekkota
- Family: Gekkonidae
- Genus: Cyrtodactylus
- Species: C. semenanjungensis

Binomial name
- Cyrtodactylus semenanjungensis Grismer & Leong, 2005

Species of lizard

The peninsular bent-toed gecko (Cyrtodactylus semenanjungensis) is a species of gecko that is endemic to western Malaysia.
