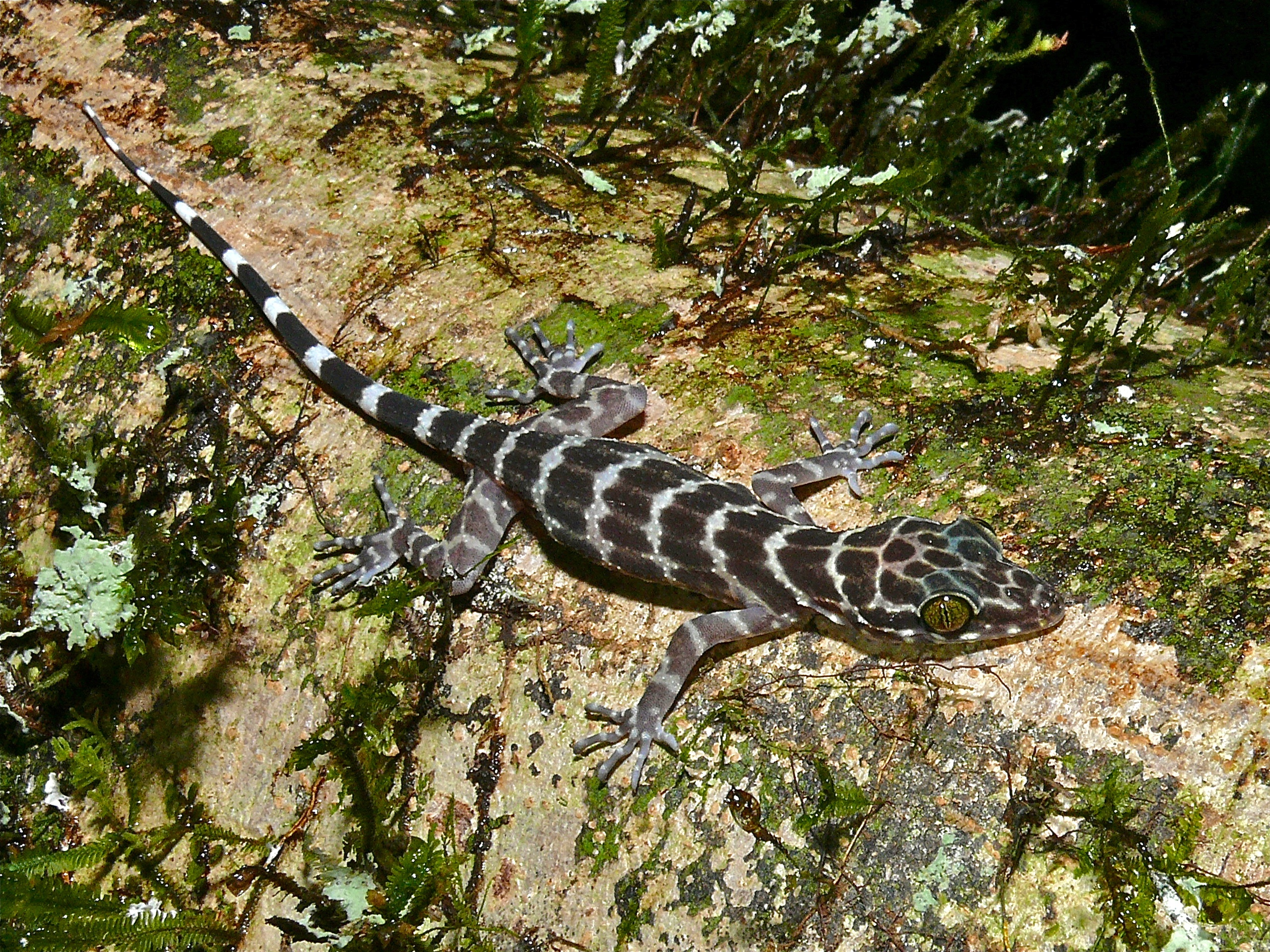

Conservation status
- Least Concern (IUCN 3.1)

Scientific classification
- Domain: Eukaryota
- Kingdom: Animalia
- Phylum: Chordata
- Class: Reptilia
- Order: Squamata
- Infraorder: Gekkota
- Family: Gekkonidae
- Genus: Cyrtodactylus
- Species: C. consobrinus

Binomial name
- Cyrtodactylus consobrinus (Peters, 1871)

Synonyms
- Gymnodactylus consobrinus; Gonydactylus consobrinus

= Cyrtodactylus consobrinus =

Species of lizard

Cyrtodactylus consobrinus, also known as Peters's bow-fingered gecko or the thin-banded forest gecko, is a species of gecko that is found on the Malaysian peninsula and Borneo.
