= Panti Mountain bent-toed gecko =

Scientific classification
- Kingdom: Animalia
- Phylum: Chordata
- Class: Reptilia
- Order: Squamata
- Suborder: Gekkota
- Family: Gekkonidae
- Genus: Cyrtodactylus
- Species: C. pantiensis

Binomial name
- Cyrtodactylus pantiensis Grismer, Chan, Grismer, Wood, & Belabut, 2008

Species of lizard

The Panti Mountain bent-toed gecko (Cyrtodactylus pantiensis) is a species of gecko that is endemic to western Malaysia.
