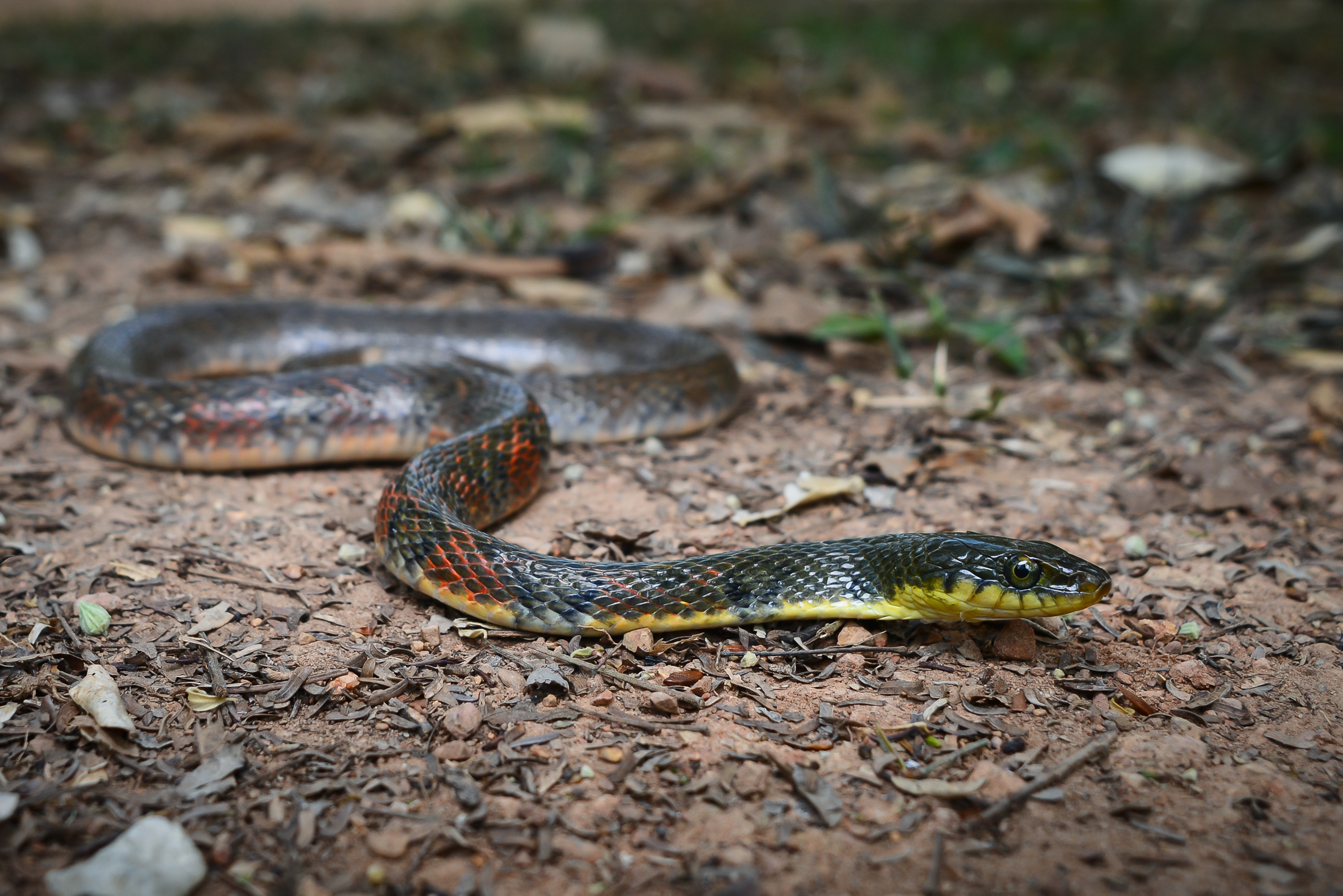
- Xenochrophis trianguligerus from Kaeng Krachan National Park

Conservation status
- Least Concern (IUCN 3.1)

Scientific classification
- Kingdom: Animalia
- Phylum: Chordata
- Class: Reptilia
- Order: Squamata
- Suborder: Serpentes
- Family: Colubridae
- Genus: Xenochrophis
- Species: X. trianguligerus

Binomial name
- Xenochrophis trianguligerus (Boie, 1827)

= Triangle keelback =

Species of snake

The triangle keelback (Xenochrophis trianguligerus) is a species of snake found in Brunei Darussalam, Burma (Myanmar), Cambodia, India (Nicobar Islands; Arunachal Pradesh (Deban - Changlang district)), Indonesia (Nias, Mentawai, Sumatra, Laos, Malaysia (Malaya and East Malaysia), Singapore, Thailand, and Vietnam.

The type locality is Java.

== Gallery ==
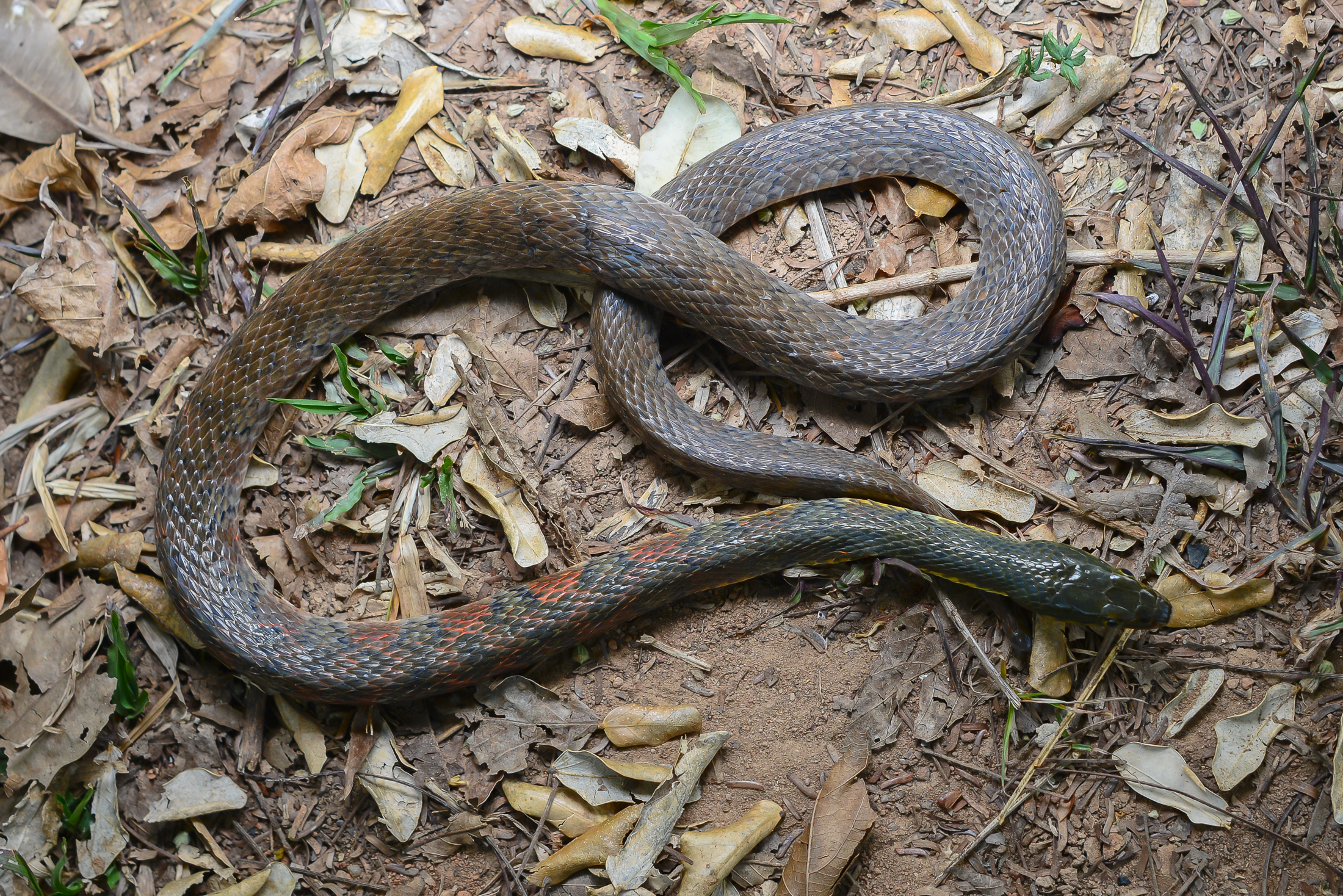
Xenochrophis trianguligerus from Kaeng Krachan National Park.

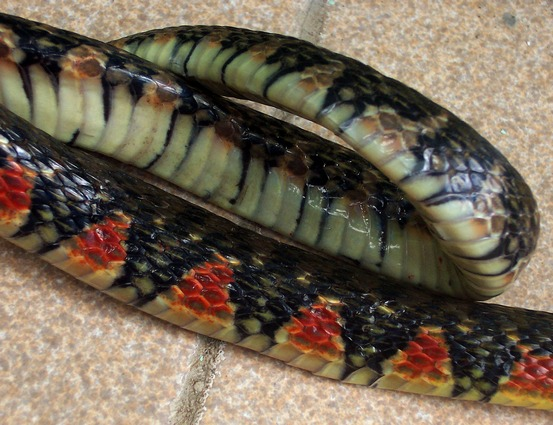
Body close-up of X. trianguligerus, showing triangle marks.

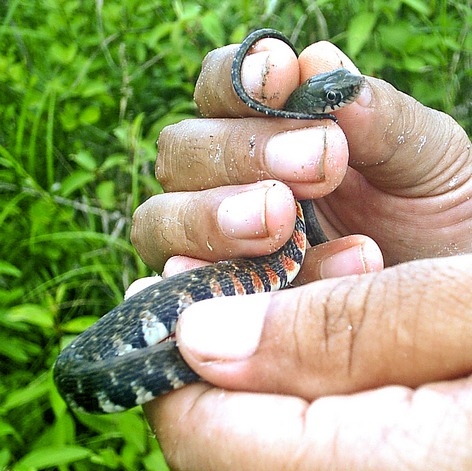
Xenochrophis trianguligerus from East Borneo

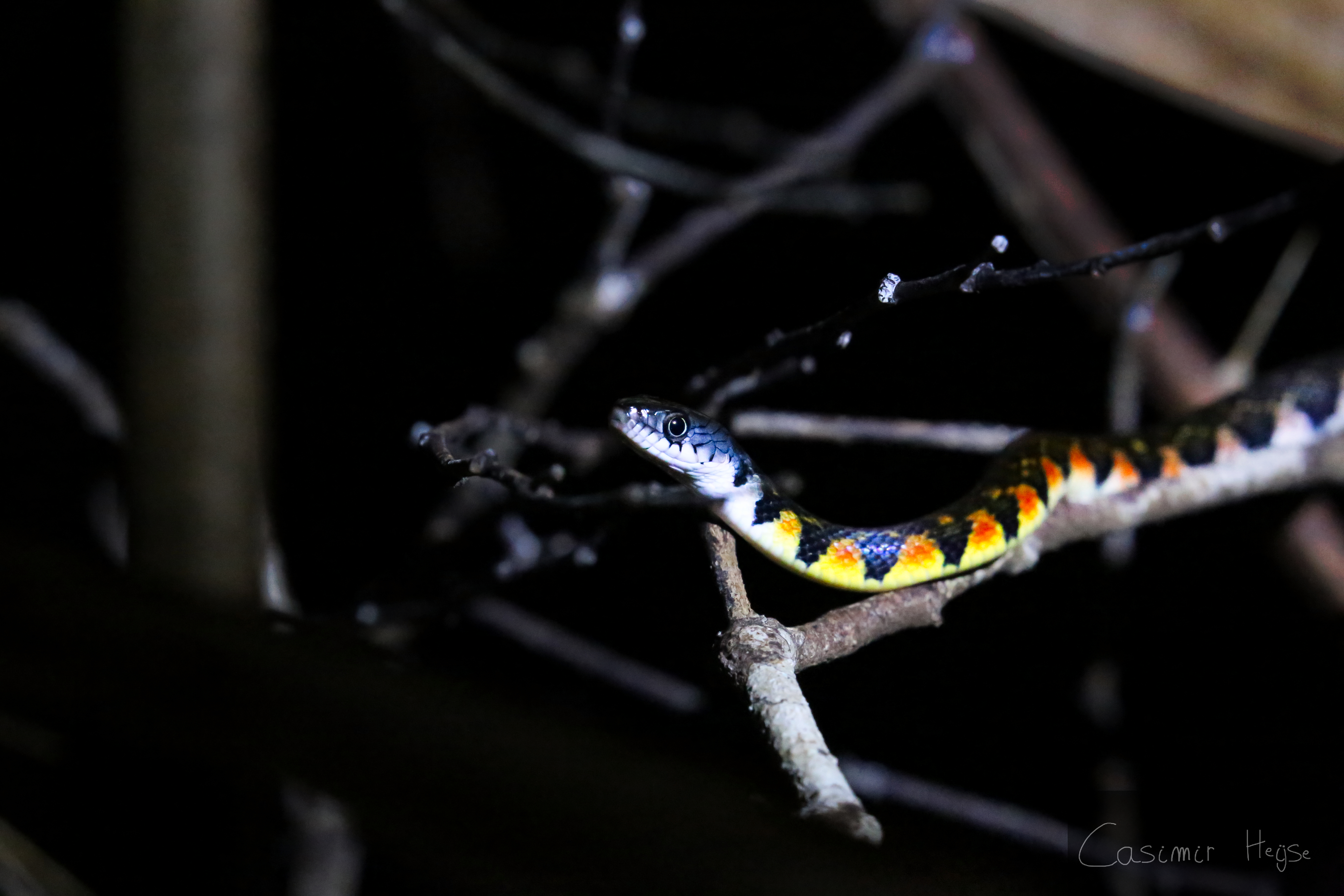
Triangle Keelback from Sabah, Borneo
