= List of reptiles of China =

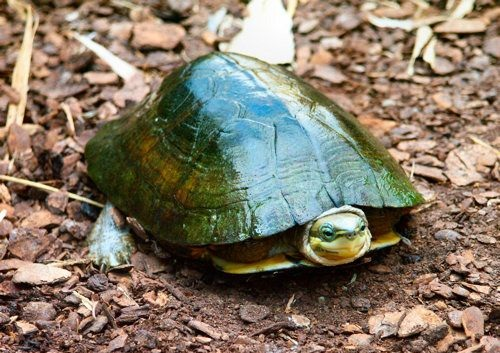
Zhou's box turtle is a critically endangered species that is endemic to China.

China has around 403 different species of reptiles that can be found in many environments including deserts, grasslands, rivers, and forests. It is the country with the seventh largest amount of different reptile species.

== Turtles and tortoises ==
=== Geoemydid turtles ===
==== Box turtles ====
- Amboina box turtle (Cuora amboinensis)
- Yellow-headed box turtle (Cuora aurocapitata)
- Vietnamese three-striped box turtle (Cuora cyclornata)
- Chinese box turtle (Cuora flavomarginata)
- Indochinese box turtle (Cuora galbinifrons)
- McCord's box turtle (Cuora mccordi)
- Keeled box turtle (Cuora mouhotii)
- Pan's box turtle (Cuora pani)
- Golden coin turtle (Cuora trifasciata)
- Yunnan box turtle (Cuora yunnanensis)
- Zhou's box turtle (Cuora zhoui)

==== Eyed turtles ====
- Burmese eyed turtle (Morenia ocellata)
- Beale's eyed turtle (Sacalia bealei)
- Four-eyed turtle (Sacalia quadriocellata)

==== Leaf turtles ====
- Asian leaf turtle (Cyclemys dentata)
- Black-breasted leaf turtle (Geoemyda spengleri)

==== Pond turtles ====
- Chinese broad-headed pond turtle (Chinemys megalocephala)
- Yellow pond turtle (Mauremus mutica)
- Red-necked pond turtle (Mauremys nigricans)
- Chinese pond turtle (Mauremys reevesii)
- Chinese stripe-necked turtle (Mauremys sinensis)

==== Roofed turtles ====
- Burmese roofed turtle (Batagur trivittata)

=== Miscellaneous and monotypic ===
- Big-headed turtle (Platysternon megacephalum)

=== Sea turtles ===
- Loggerhead sea turtle (Caretta caretta)
- Green sea turtle (Chelonia mydas)
- Leatherback sea turtle (Dermochelys coriacea)
- Hawksbill sea turtle (Eretmochelys imbricata)
- Olive ridley sea turtle (Lepidochelys olivacea)

=== Softshell turtles ===
- Wattle-necked softshell turtle (Palea steindachneri)
- Cantor's giant softshell turtle (Pelochelys cantorii)
- Hunan softshell turtle (Pelodiscus axenaria)
- Amur softshell turtle (Pelodiscus maackii)
- Lesser Chinese softshell turtle (Pelodiscus parviformis)
- Chinese softshell turtle (Pelodiscus sinensis)
- Yangtze giant softshell turtle (Rafetus swinhoei)

=== Tortoises ===
- Russian tortoise (Agrionemys horsfieldii)
- Elongated tortoise (Indotestudo elongata)
- Impressed tortoise (Manouria impressa)

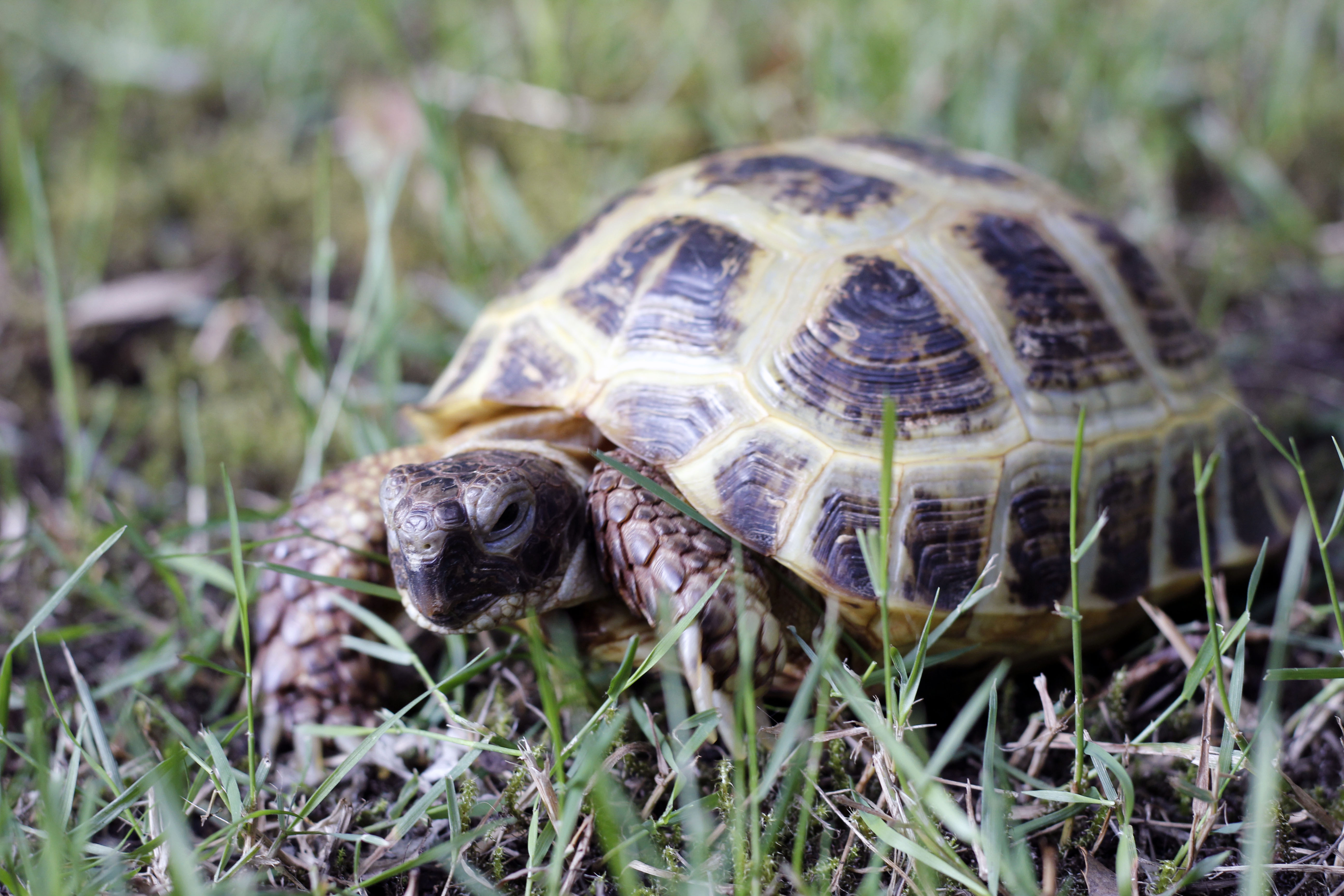
A Russian tortoise, a common choice as a house pet.

== Snakes ==
=== Blindsnakes ===
- Diard's blindsnake (Argyrophis diardii)
- White-headed blindsnake (Indotyphlops albiceps)
- Brahminy blind snake (Indotyphlops braminus)
- Indotyphlops lazelli
- Striped blindsnake (Ramphotyphlops lineatus)

=== Boas ===
- Dwarf sand boa (Eryx miliaris)
- Tartar sand boa (Eryx tataricus)

=== Cat snakes ===
- Square-headed cat snake (Boiga kraepelini)

=== Cobras ===
- Chinese cobra (Naja atra)
- Monocled cobra (Naja kaouthia)

=== Coral snakes ===
- Speckled coral snake (Calliophis maculiceps)
- Kellogg's coral snake (Sinomicrurus kelloggi)
- Sinomicrurus hatori
- MacClelland's coral snake (Sinomicrurus macclellandi)
- Taiwanese coral snake (Sinomicrurus sauteri)

=== Green snakes ===
- Greater green snake (Cyclophiops major)

=== Kraits ===
- Northeastern hill krait (Bungarus bungaroides)
- Banded krait (Bungarus fasciatus)
- Many-banded krait (Bungarus multicinctus)

=== Lamprophiid snakes ===
- Common mock viper (Psammodynastes pulverulentus)
- Psammophis indochinensis
- Steppe ribbon racer (Psammophis lineolatus)

=== Miscellaneous and monotypic ===
- Blyth's reticulated snake (Blythia reticulata)
- Collared reed snake (Calamaria pavimentata)
- Bearded snake (Fimbrios klossi)
- Gonyosoma frenatum
- King cobra (Ophiophagus hannah)
- Bailey's snake (Thermophis baileyi)

=== Natricine snakes ===
- Buff striped keelback (Amphiesma stolatum)
- Grass snake (Natrix natrix)
- Dice snake (Natrix tessellata)
- Maki's keelback (Hebius miyajimae)
- Sauter's keelback (Hebius sauteri)

=== Odd-scaled snakes ===
- Bourret's odd-scaled snake (Achalinus ater)
- Formosan odd-scaled snake (Achalinus formosanus)
- Hainan odd-scaled snake (Achalinus hainanus)
- Hunan odd-scaled snake (Achalinus hunanensis)
- Zong's odd-scaled snake (Achalinus jinggangensis)
- Sichuan odd-scaled snake (Achalinus meiguensis)
- Black odd-scaled snake (Achalinus niger)
- Boulenger's odd-scaled snake (Achalinus rufescens)
- Peters's odd-scaled snake (Achalinus spinalis)

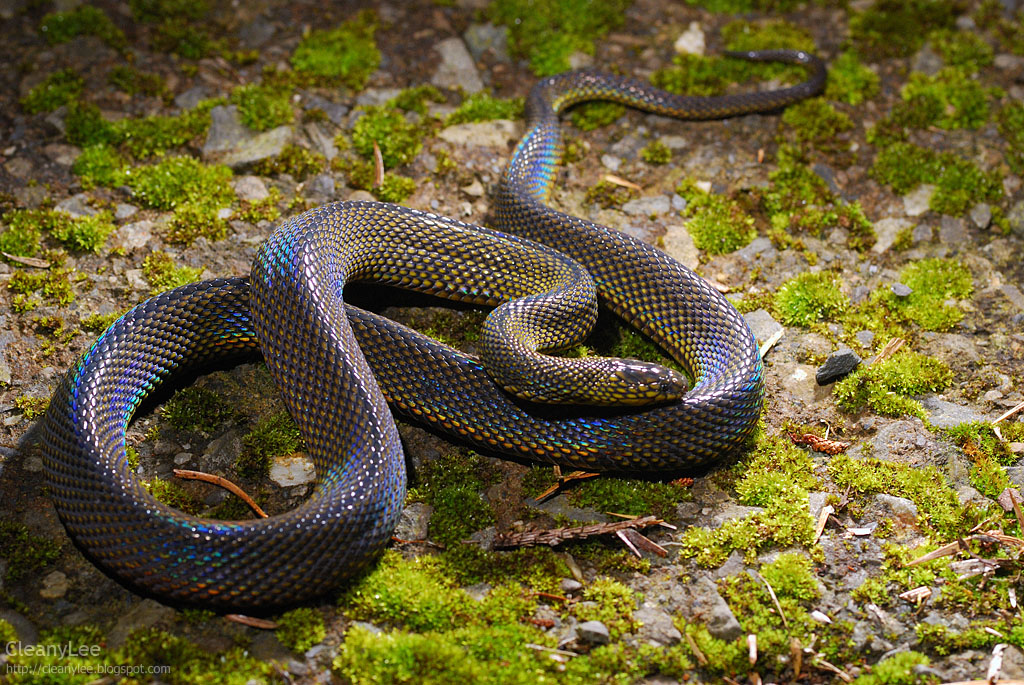
A Formosan odd-scaled snake (Achalinus formosanus) in Taiwan.

=== Pipe snakes ===
- Red-tailed pipe snake (Cylindrophis ruffus)

=== Pitvipers ===
- Sharp-nosed pit viper (Deinagkistrodon acutus)
- Mamushi (Gloydius blomhoffii)
- Jenkins' mountain pitviper (Ovophis jenkinsi)
- Taiwan mountain pitviper (Ovophis makazayazaya)
- Mountain pitviper (Ovophis monticola)
- Jerdon's pit viper (Protobothrops jerdonii)
- Brown-spotted pitviper (Protobothrops mucrosquamatus)
- Taiwan pit viper (Trimeresurus gracilis)
- Bamboo pit viper (Trimeresurus gramineus)
- Trimeresurus loong
- Mangshan pitviper (Trimeresurus mangshanensis)
- Motuo bamboo pitviper (Trimeresurus medoensis)
- Stejneger's pit viper (Trimeresurus stejnegeri)

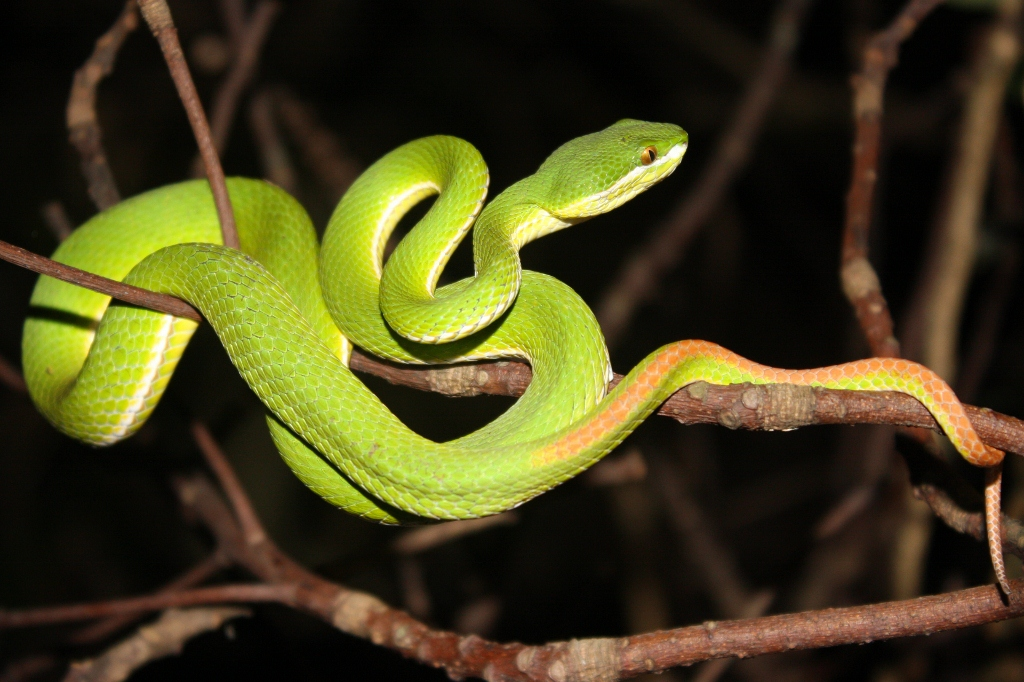
A bamboo pit viper (Trimeresurus gramineus) perched on a branch in a Cuiheng zoo.

=== Pythons ===
- Burmese python (Python bivittatus)

=== Ratsnakes ===
- Korean ratsnake (Elaphe anomala)
- Twin-spotted ratsnake (Elaphe bimaculata)
- King ratsnake (Elaphe carinata)
- David's ratsnake (Elaphe davidi)
- Amur rat snake (Elaphe schrenckii)
- Beauty rat snake (Elaphe taeniura)
- Elaphe zoigeensis
- Mandarin ratsnake (Euprepiophis mandarinus)

=== Sea kraits ===
- Banded sea krait (Laticauda colubrina)
- Blue-lipped sea krait (Laticauda laticaudata)
- Black-banded sea krait (Laticauda semifasciata)

=== Sea snakes ===
- Beaded sea snake (Aipysurus eydouxii)
- Golden sea snake (Aipysurus laevis)
- Stokes' seasnake (Astrotia stokesii)
- Turtlehead sea snake (Emydocephalus ijimae)
- Dwarf sea snake (Hydrophis caerulescens)
- Shaw's sea snake (Hydrophis curtus)
- Annulated sea snake (Hydrophis cyanocinctus)
- Striped sea snake (Hydrophis fasciatus)
- Graceful small-headed sea snake (Hydrophis gracilis)
- Spine-bellied sea snake (Hydrophis hardwickii)
- Plain sea snake (Hydrophis inornatus)
- Jerdon's sea snake (Hydrophis jerdonii)
- Slender-necked sea snake (Hydrophis melanocephalus)
- Ornate reef sea snake (Hydrophis ornatus)
- Hydrophis parviceps
- Spiny-headed seasnake (Hydrophis peronii)
- Yellow-bellied sea snake (Hydrophis platurus)
- Yellow sea snake (Hydrophis spiralis)
- Stokes's sea snake (Hydrophis stokesii)
- West coast black-headed sea snake (Hydrophis torquatus)
- Viperine sea snake (Hydrophis viperinus)
- Jerdon's sea snake (Kerilia jerdonii)
- Shaw's sea snake (Lapemis curtus)
- Anomalous sea snake (Hydrophis anomalus)

=== Slug snakes ===
- Atayal slug-eating snake (Pareas atayal)
- Boulenger's slug snake (Pareas boulengeri)
- Keeled slug-eating snake (Pareas carinatus)
- Chinese slug snake (Pareas chinensis)
- Formosan slug snake (Pareas formosensis)
- Hampton's slug snake (Pareas hamptoni)
- Taiwan slug snake (Pareas komaii)
- Spotted slug snake (Pareas margaritophorus)
- Common slug snake (Pareas monticola)
- Xiaoheishan slug-eating snake (Pareas nigriceps)
- Stanley's slug snake (Pareas stanleyi)

=== Sunbeam snakes ===
- Xenopeltis hainanensis
- Xenopeltis unicolor

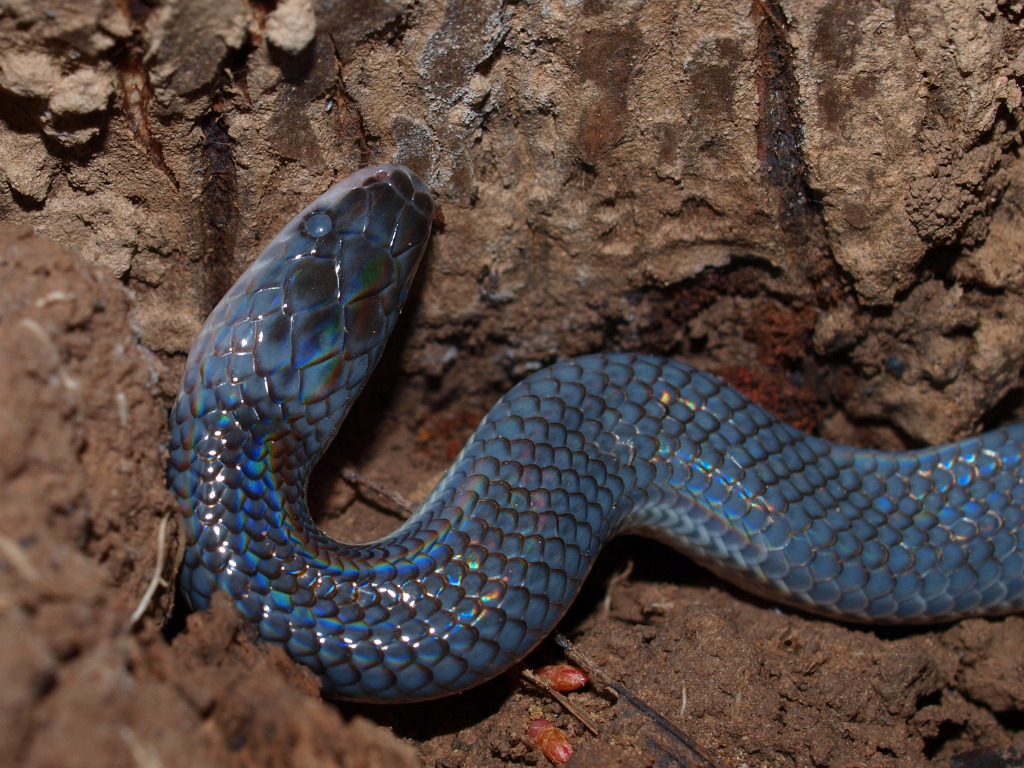
This closeup clearly shows the characteristic iridescent highly polished scales of Xenopeltis unicolor.

=== Vipers ===
- Fea's viper (Azemiops feae)
- White-headed Fea viper (Azemiops kharini)
- Russell's viper (Daboia russelii)
- Eastern Russell's viper (Daboia siamensis)
- Common European viper (Vipera berus)
- Meadow viper (Vipera ursinii)

=== Wart snakes ===
- Little wart snake (Acrochordus granulatus)

=== Water snakes ===
- Rainbow water snake (Enhydris enhydris)
- Rice paddy snake (Hypsiscopus plumbea)
- Bennett's mud snake (Myrrophis bennettii)
- Chinese water snake (Myrrophis chinensis)
- Bocourt's water snake (Subsessor bocourti)

=== Worm-eating snakes ===
- Mountain worm-eating snake (Trachischium monticola)
- Yellowbelly worm-eating snake (Trachischium tenuiceps)

== Crocodilians ==
=== Alligators ===
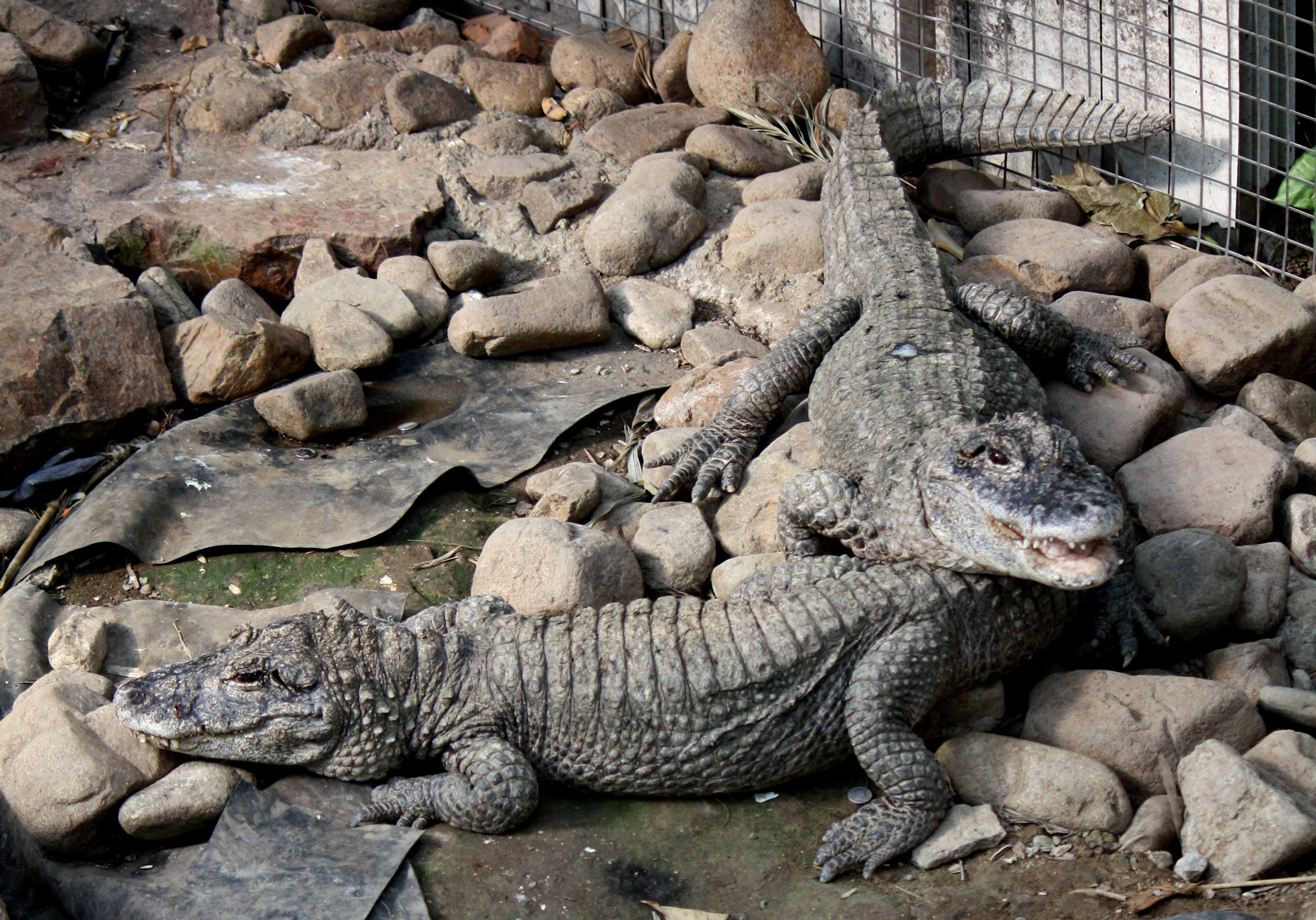
A pair of Chinese alligators in the Shanghai Zoo.

- Chinese alligator (Alligator sinensis)

=== Crocodiles ===
- † Saltwater crocodile (Crocodylus porosus) (Note: Likely extirpated)

== Lizards ==
=== Agamid lizards (flying) ===
- Blanford's flying lizard (Draco blanfordii)
- Spotted flying dragon (Draco maculatus)

=== Agamid lizards (non-flying) ===
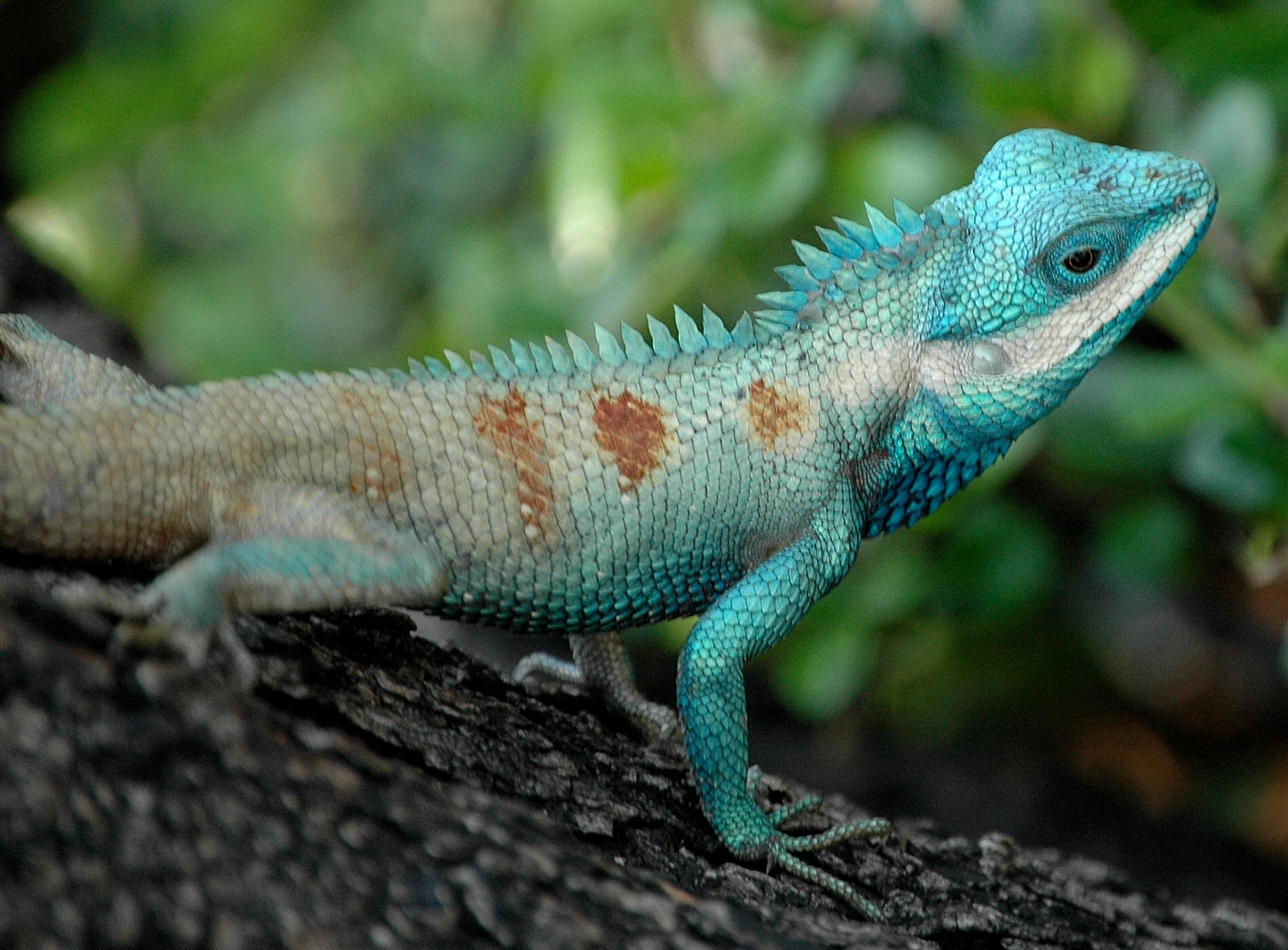
A blue-crested lizard (Calotes mystaceus).

- Armored pricklenape (Acanthosaura armata)
- Brown pricklenape (Acanthosaura lepidogaster)
- Emma Gray's forest lizard (Calotes emma)
- Indo-Chinese forest lizard (Calotes jerdoni)
- Medog bloodsucker (Calotes medogensis)
- Blue-crested lizard (Calotes mystaceus)
- Oriental garden lizard (Calotes versicolor)
- Japalura andersoniana
- Three-keeled mountain lizard (Japalura tricarinata)
- Diploderma batangensis
- Diploderma brevicauda
- Short-legged japalure (Diploderma brevipes)
- Banded japalure (Diploderma fasciata)
- Dymond's japalure (Diploderma dymondi)
- Sichuan japalure (Diploderma flaviceps)
- Graham's japalure (Diploderma grahami)
- Emerald mountain dragon (Diploderma iadinum)
- Smooth-venter mountain dragon (Diploderma laeviventre)
- Diploderma luei
- Ota's japalure (Diploderma makii)
- Diploderma micangshanensis
- Ryukyu japalure (Diploderma polygonatum)
- Diploderma slowinskii
- Japalura tree dragon (Diploderma splendidum)
- Taiwan japalure (Diploderma swinhonis))
- Chinese japalure (Diploderma varcoae)
- Sail mountain lizard (Diploderma vela)
- Diploderma yulongense
- Yunnan japalure (Diploderma yunnanense)
- Diploderma zhaoermii
- Badakhshana rock agama (Laudakia badakhshana)
- Himalayan agama (Laudakia himalayana)
- Papenfuss' rock agama (Laudakia papenfussi)
- Anan's rock agama (Laudakia sacra)
- Mongolian rock agama (Laudakia stoliczkana)
- Kashmir rock agama (Laudakia tuberculata)
- Wu's rock agama (Laudakia wui)
- Reeves' butterfly lizard (Leiolepis reevesii)
- Small forest lizard (Oriocalotes paulus)
- Yarkand toad-headed agama (Phrynocephalus axillaris)
- Phrynocephalus erythrurus
- Forsyth's toadhead agama (Phrynocephalus forsythii)
- Shanxi toadhead agama (Phrynocephalus frontalis)
- Spotted toadhead agama (Phrynocephalus guttatus)
- Sunwatcher toadhead agama (Phrynocephalus helioscopus)
- Secret toadhead agama (Phrynocephalus mystaceus)
- Przewalski's toadhead agama (Phrynocephalus przewalskii)
- Phrynocephalus putjatai
- Roborowski's toadhead agama (Phrynocephalus roborowskii)
- Theobald's toad-headed agama (Phrynocephalus theobaldi)
- Variegated toadhead agama (Phrynocephalus versicolor)
- Qinghai toadhead agama (Phrynocephalus vlangalii)
- Chinese water dragon (Physignathus cocincinus)
- Vietnam false bloodsucker (Pseudocalotes brevipes)
- Kakhyen Hills spiny lizard (Pseudocalotes kakhienensis)
- Kingdonward's bloodsucker (Pseudocalotes kingdonwardi)
- Burmese false bloodsucker (Pseudocalotes microlepis)
- Green fan-throated lizard (Ptyctolaemus gularis)
- Brilliant ground agama (Trapelus agilis)
- Steppe agama (Trapelus sanguinolentus)

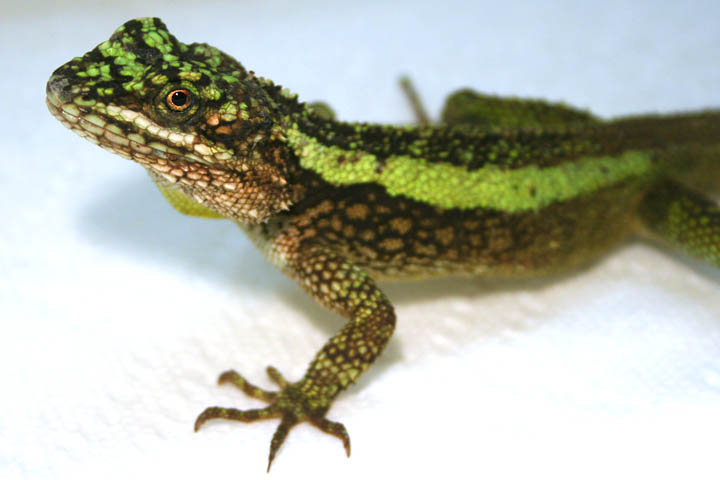
A male Japalura tree dragon.

=== Geckos ===
- Kaspischer even-fingered gecko (Alsophylax pipiens)
- Xinjiang even-fingered gecko (Alsophylax przewalskii)
- Frontier bow-fingered gecko (Altiphylax stoliczkai)
- Cayu bent-toed gecko (Cyrtodactylus cayuensis)
- Cyrtodactylus tibetanus
- Cyrtodactylus wayakonei
- Cyrtodactylus zhaoermii
- Cyrtopodion medogense
- Common four-clawed gecko (Gehyra mutilata)
- Adler's gecko (Gekko adleri)
- Shanxi gecko (Gekko auriverrucosus)
- Gray's Chinese gecko (Gekko chinensis)
- Tokay gecko (Gekko gecko)
- Gekko guishanicus
- Hokou gecko (Gekko hokouensis)
- Schlegel's Japanese gecko (Gekko japonicus)
- Botel gecko (Gekko kikuchii)
- Kwangsi gecko (Gekko kwangsiensis)
- Libo's gecko (Gekko liboensis)
- Mell's gecko (Gekko melli)
- Reeves's Tokay gecko (Gekko reevesii)
- Yunnan gecko (Gekko scabridus)
- Gekko similignum
- Gekko subpalmatus
- Peking gecko (Gekko swinhonis)
- Mingtao's gecko (Gekko taibaiensis)
- Gekko tesselatus
- Gekko wenxianensis
- Vietnamese leopard gecko (Goniurosaurus araneus)
- Goniurosaurus bawanglingensis
- Goniurosaurus hainanensis
- Kadoories's cave gecko (Goniurosaurus kadoorieorum)
- Guangxi cave gecko (Goniurosaurus kwangsiensis)
- Goniurosaurus liboensis
- Lichtenfelder's gecko (Goniurosaurus lichtenfelderi)
- Goniurosaurus luii
- Yingde leopard gecko (Goniurosaurus yingdeensis)
- Zhe-long's leopard gecko (Goniurosaurus zhelongi)
- Zhou's leopard gecko (Goniurosaurus zhoui)
- Hemidactylus aquilonius
- Oriental leaf-tailed gecko (Hemidactylus bowringii)
- Common house gecko (Hemidactylus frenatus)
- Indo-Pacific gecko (Hemidactylus garnotii)
- Flat-tailed house gecko (Hemidactylus platyurus)
- Stejneger's leaf-toed gecko (Hemidactylus stejnegeri)
- Changning slender gecko (Hemiphyllodactylus changningensis)
- Dushan slender gecko (Hemiphyllodactylus dushanensis)
- Hong Kong slender gecko (Hemiphyllodactylus hongkongensis)
- Hemiphyllodactylus huishuiensis
- Jinping slender gecko (Hemiphyllodactylus jinpingensis)
- Longling slender gecko (Hemiphyllodactylus longlingensis)
- Indopacific tree gecko (Hemiphyllodactylus typus)
- Asian slender gecko (Hemiphyllodactylus yunnanensis)
- Zug's slender gecko (Hemiphyllodactylus zugi)
- Mourning gecko (Lepidodactylus lugubris)
- Transcaspian bent-toed gecko (Mediodactylus russowii)
- Tenuidactylus dadunensis
- Yangihissar gecko (Tenuidactylus elongatus)
- Przewalski's wonder gecko (Teratoscincus przewalskii)
- Teratoscincus roborowskii
- Common wonder gecko (Teratoscincus scincus)

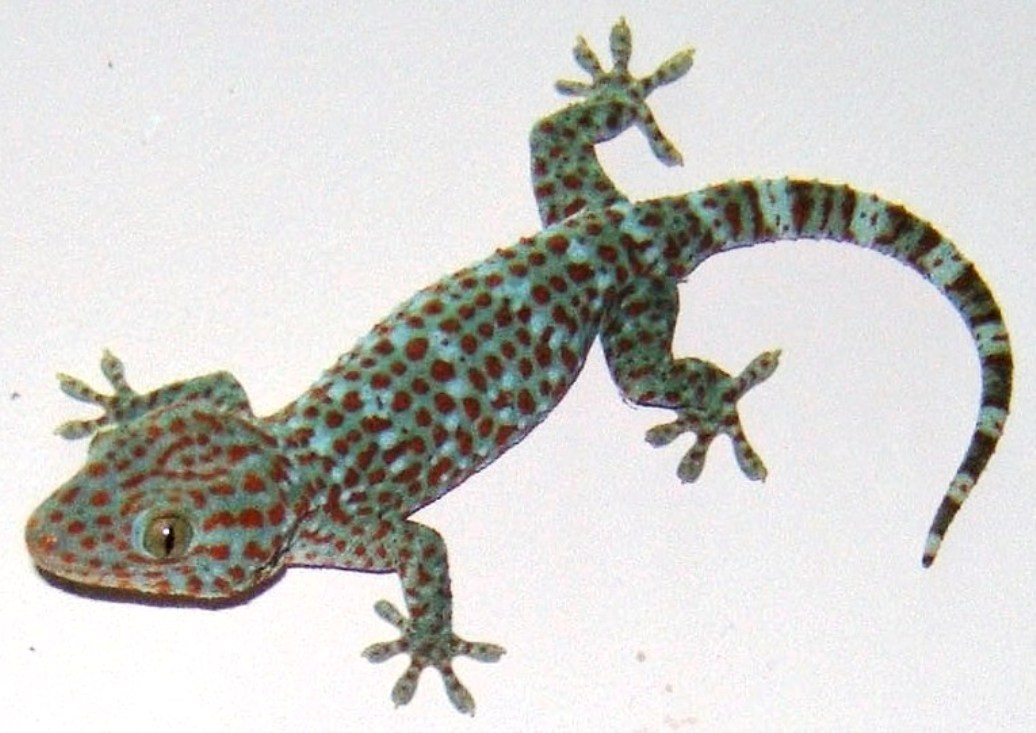
A Tokay gecko, one of the most well-known species of geckos.

=== Glass lizards ===
- Burmese glass lizard (Dopasia gracilis)
- Hainan glass lizard (Dopasia hainanensis)
- Hart's glass lizard (Dopasia harti)
- Ludovic's glass lizard (Dopasia ludovici)

=== Miscellaneous and monotypic ===
- Chinese crocodile lizard (Shinisaurus crocodilurus)
- Asian grass lizard (Takydromus sexlineatus)
- Viviparous lizard (Zootoca vivipara)

=== Skinks ===
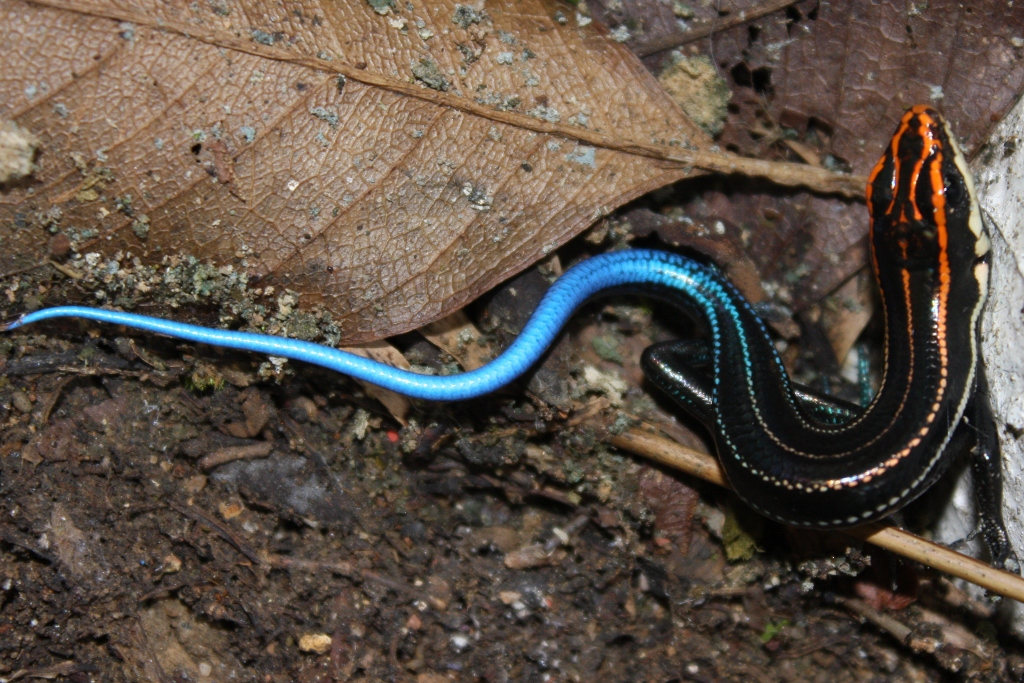
Plestiodon elegans, near Ho Chung, Sai Kung District, New Territories, Hong Kong.

- Asymblepharus alaicus
- Ladak ground skink (Asymblepharus ladacensis)
- Sikkim ground skink (Asymblepharus sikimmensis)
- Chinese short-limbed skink (Ateuchosaurus chinensis)
- Longtail mabuya (Eutropis longicaudata)
- East Indian brown mabuya (Eutropis multifasciata)
- Short-limbed supple skink (Lygosoma quadrupes)
- Gail's eyelid skink (Plestiodon capito)
- Chinese skink (Plestiodon chinensis)
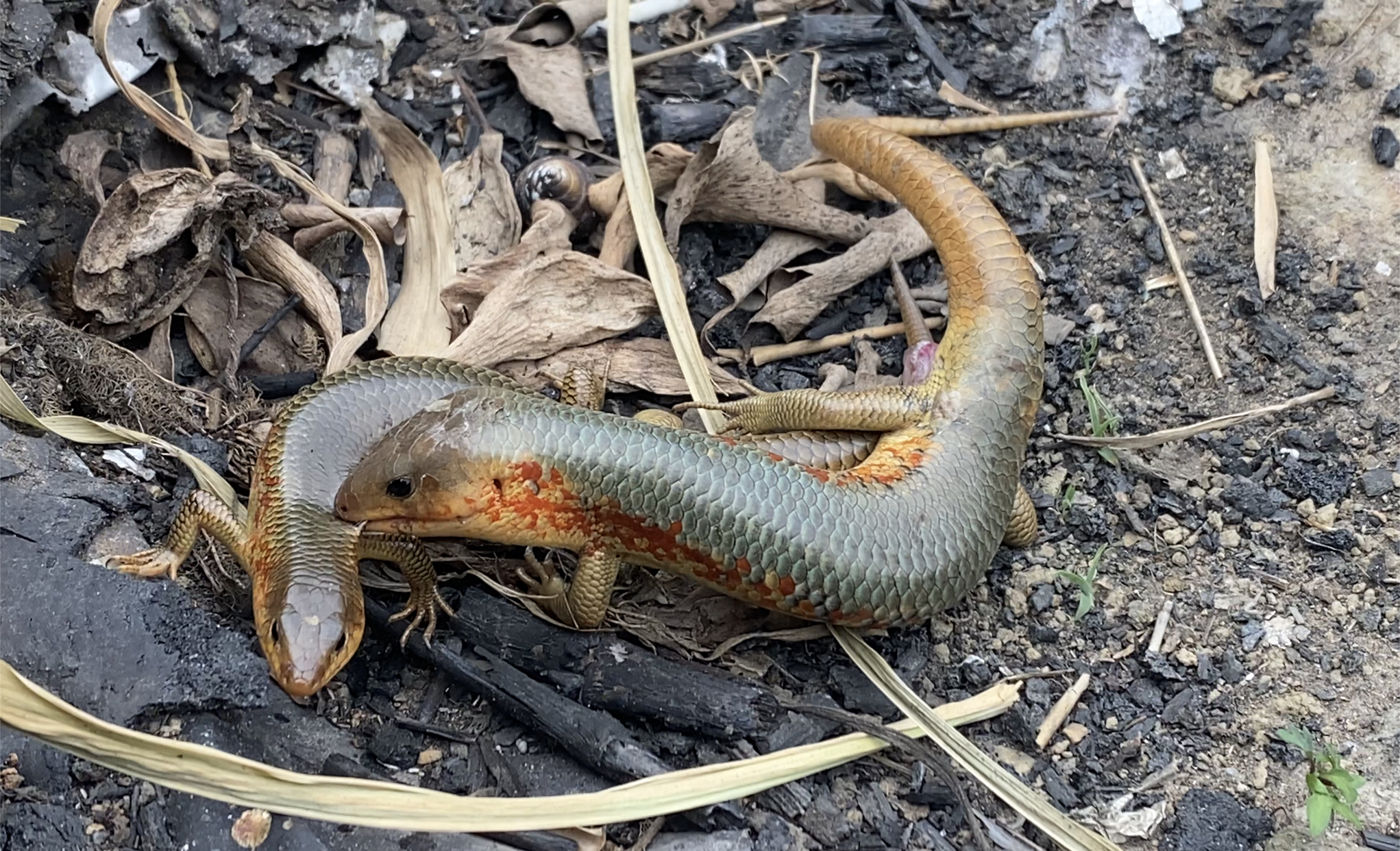
- Shanghai skink (Plestiodon elegans)
- Ladakh ground skink (Scincella ladacensis)
- Plestiodon liui
- Pope's skink (Plestiodon popei)
- Hong Kong skink (Plestiodon quadrilineatus)
- Vietnam skink (Plestiodon tamdaoensis)
- Plestiodon tunganus
- Barbour's ground skink (Scincella barbouri)
- Doria's ground skink (Scincella doriae)
- Scincella huanrenensis
- Modest ground skink (Scincella modesta)
- Scincella monticola
- Scincella potanini
- Scincella przewalskii
- Reeves' smooth skink (Scincella reevesii)
- Scincella schmidti
- Scincella tsinlingensis
- Sphenomorphus courcyanus
- Sphenomorphus incognitus
- Indian forest skink (Sphenomorphus indicus)
- Spotted forest skink (Sphenomorphus maculatus)
- Christmas Island grass-skink (Subdoluseps bowringii)
- Berdmore's water skink (Tropidophorus berdmorei)
- Tropidophorus guangxiensis
- Hainan water skink (Tropidophorus hainanus)
- Chinese water skink (Tropidophorus sinicus)
