= Goniurosaurus wangshu =

Scientific classification
- Kingdom: Animalia
- Phylum: Chordata
- Class: Reptilia
- Order: Squamata
- Suborder: Gekkota
- Family: Eublepharidae
- Genus: Goniurosaurus
- Species: G. wangshu

Binomial name
- Goniurosaurus wangshu Zhu et al., 2022

Species of lizard

Goniurosaurus wangshu, also known as the Wangshu's leopard gecko or the Wangshu cave gecko (Chinese: 望舒睑虎), is a species of gecko that belongs to the family Eublepharidae (eyelid geckos). It is native the Guangdong province in southern China.

== Description ==
It is a small species being around 76.08–83.60 mm in size. The dorsal regions of its head and body have a ground color. The color of the limbs in adults are yellow and iris orange.

== Taxonomy ==
This species is a gecko meaning that it belongs to the suborder Gekkota. More specifically, it is a member of the family Eublepharidae, also known as the eyelid geckos. Phylogenetic analysis of this species places in within the G. yingdeensis species group. Theses analyses place this species to be most closely related to G. gollum.

== Discovery ==
The holotype of this species is ECNU-V0085 and it is an adult male. It was collected in the northern Guangdong Province of China at an elevation of 200–300 meters. Due to conservation concerns, the exact locality of this species is withhold. The same goes for the paratype, ECNU-V0084, which is an adult female.
