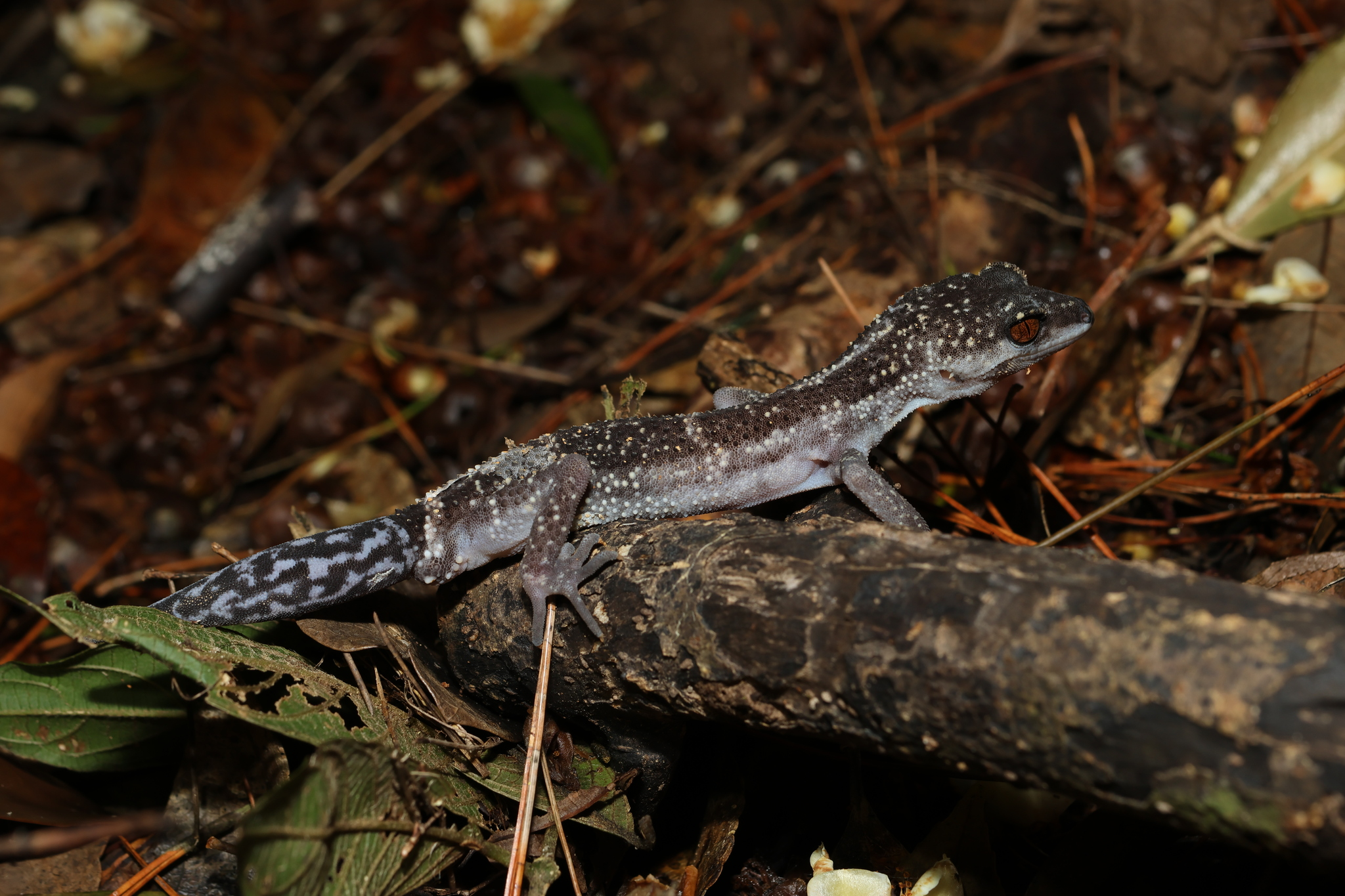

Scientific classification
- Kingdom: Animalia
- Phylum: Chordata
- Class: Reptilia
- Order: Squamata
- Suborder: Gekkota
- Family: Eublepharidae
- Genus: Goniurosaurus
- Species: G. nebulozonatus

Binomial name
- Goniurosaurus nebulozonatus Kurita & Toda, 2024

= Goniurosaurus nebulozonatus =

Species of lizard

Goniurosaurus nebulozonatus is a species of nocturnal gecko in the family Eublepharidae. This species is endemic to the northern part of Okinawajima Island and Kourijima Island in Ryukyu Archipelago, Japan.

== Description ==
Goniurosaurus nebulozonatus is a medium sized gecko between 75–95 mm (3.0–3.7 in) in snout-vent length. It has reddish brown irises, bands of orange and dark brown with orange speckles on the dorsal, and is translucent white on the ventral. Its tail hass bands of dark brown and white. This species of gecko can be distinguished from the other members of the kuroiwae species group through its unique scale arrangement, and is slightly bigger on average than the other extant species in Ryukyus except for Goniurosaurus kuroiwae.

== Etymology ==
The specific name nebulozonatus comes from the Latin words "nebula" for obscurity and "zona" for band, in reference to the nebulous bandings on the dorsal trunk of the gecko. The suggested Japanese common name for this species is Yambaru Tokage-modoki.

== Habitat ==
Goniurosaurus nebulozonatus can be found in sandstone mountains, limestone karsts, coastal vegetation, mountain forests, and even areas with human activity, namely parks, graves, and roadsides.

== Diet ==
This species is mainly an insectivore. They have been observed consuming earthworms, spiders, centipedes, crickets, cockroaches, and insect larvae.
