= Goniurosaurus toyamai =

Conservation status
- Critically Endangered (IUCN 3.1)

Scientific classification
- Kingdom: Animalia
- Phylum: Chordata
- Class: Reptilia
- Order: Squamata
- Suborder: Gekkota
- Family: Eublepharidae
- Genus: Goniurosaurus
- Species: G. toyamai

Binomial name
- Goniurosaurus toyamai Grismer, Ota & Tanaka, 1994

Synonyms
- Goniurosaurus kuroiwae toyamai Grismer, Ota & Tanaka, 1994; Goniurosaurus toyamai — Dickhoff, 2004

Species of lizard

Goniurosaurus toyamai, also called commonly the Iheja ground gecko, the Iheyajima leopard gecko, and Toyama's ground gecko, is a species of lizard in the family Eublepharidae. The species is endemic to the island of Iheyajima in the Ryukyu Islands (Japan).

== Etymology ==
The specific name, toyamai, is in honor of Japanese herpetologist Masanao Toyama.

== Habitat ==
The preferred natural habitat of G. toyamai is forest.

== Reproduction ==
G. toyamai is oviparous.
