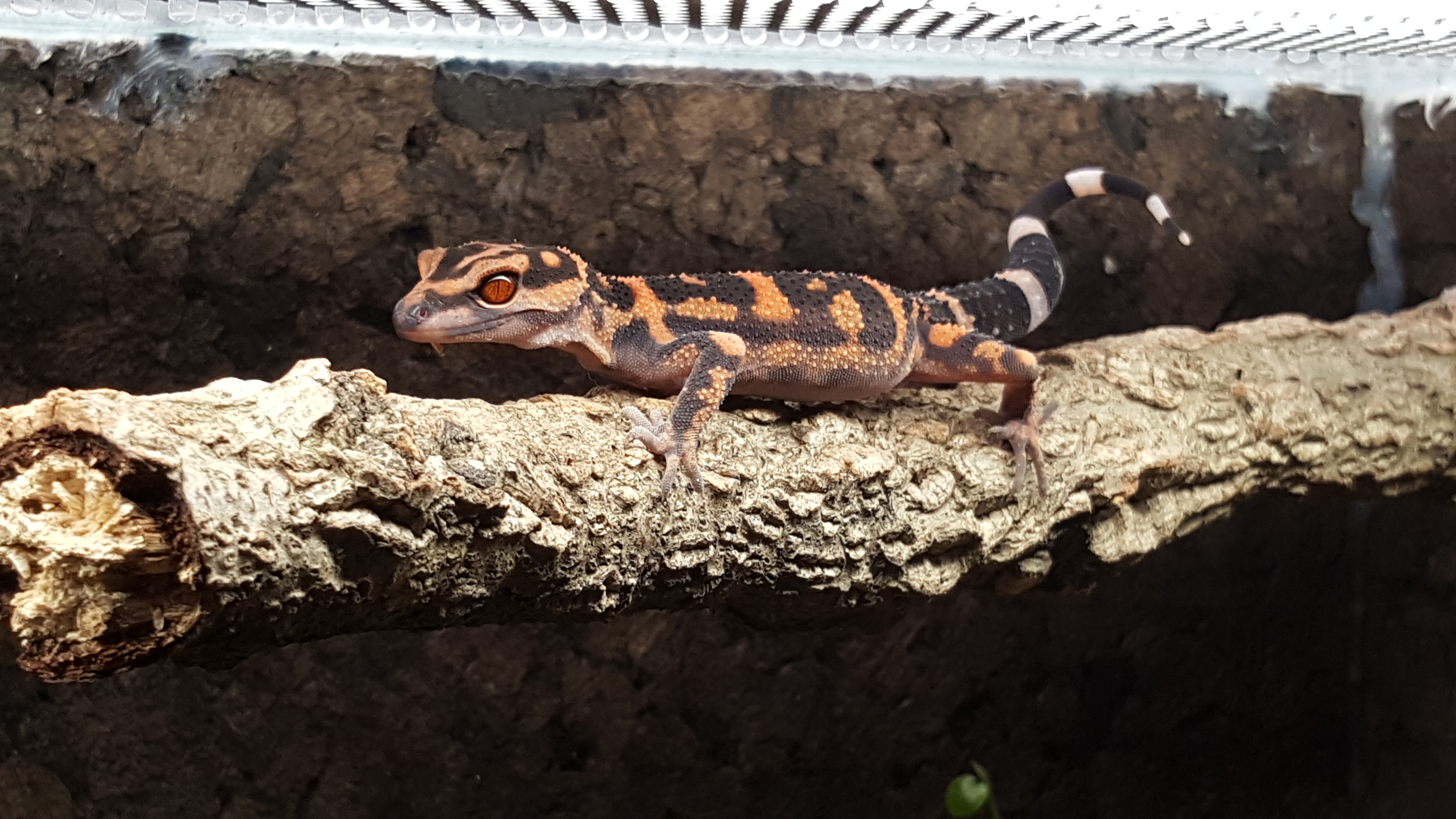
- male

Conservation status
- Endangered (IUCN 3.1)

Scientific classification
- Kingdom: Animalia
- Phylum: Chordata
- Class: Reptilia
- Order: Squamata
- Suborder: Gekkota
- Family: Eublepharidae
- Genus: Goniurosaurus
- Species: G. orientalis

Binomial name
- Goniurosaurus orientalis (Maki, 1931)

Synonyms
- Eublepharis orientalis; Eublepharis kuroiwae orientalis; Goniurosaurus kuroiwae orientalis

= Spotted ground gecko =

Species of lizard

The spotted ground gecko or Japanese cave gecko (Goniurosaurus orientalis) is a gecko endemic to the Ryukyu Islands, Japan. Goniurosaurus orientalis is found in four small islands in the Okinawa group: Tonaki Island, Tokashiki Island, Ie Island, and Aka Island.

This particular species grows up to 16 cm and it has deep red eyes. Its basic color is dark brown or black with an orange or red pattern.

As with other geckos from the family Eublepharidae, they have fully functional eyelids. And like most other geckos in the Eublepharidae family, they are insectivores. They are not common in select breeding but have increased in popularity among exotic lizard owners.

== Habitat and ecology ==
Goniurosaurus orientalis inhabits mountainous regions or limestone areas covered with broad-leaved evergreen forests. It is generally an uncommon species.
