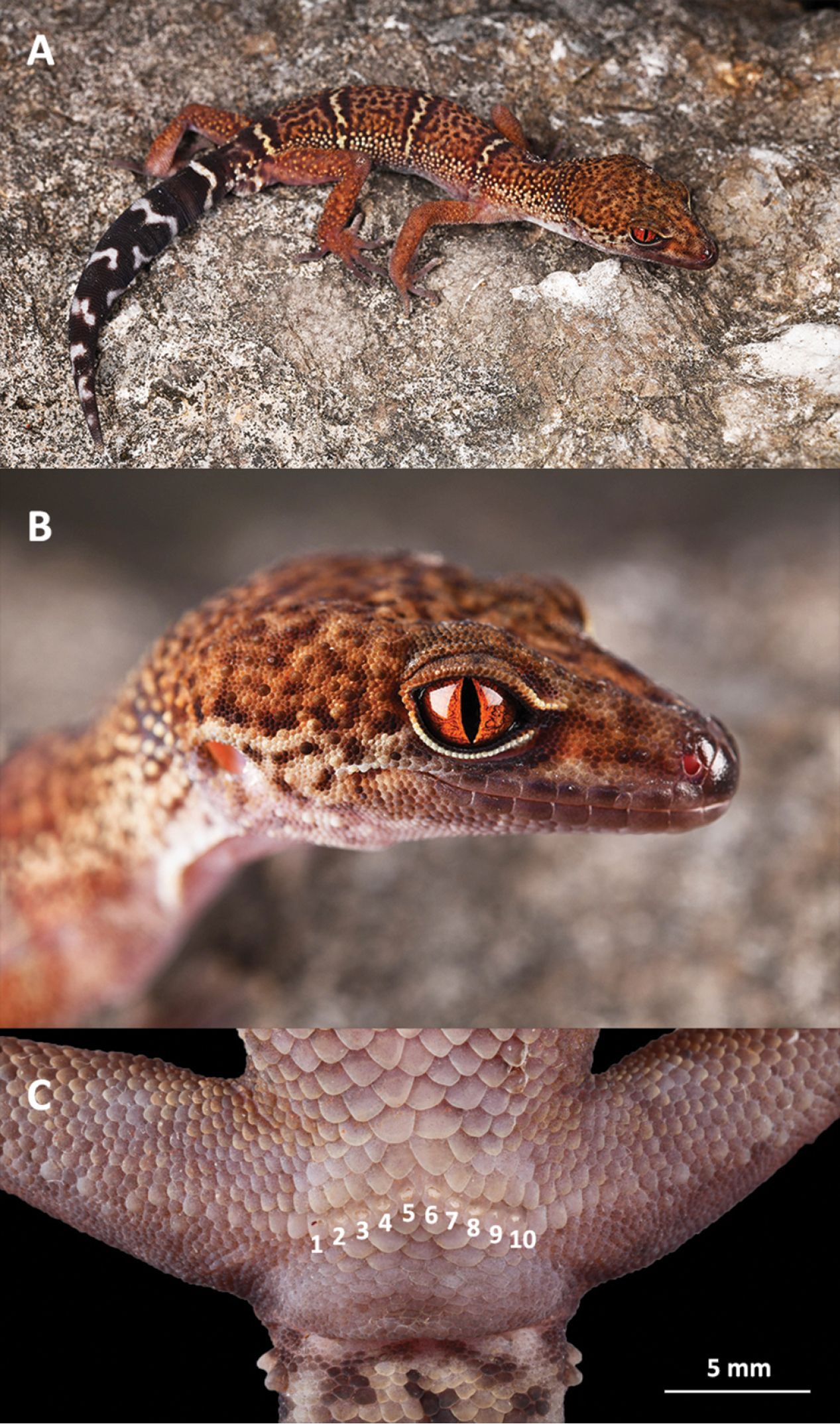

Scientific classification
- Kingdom: Animalia
- Phylum: Chordata
- Class: Reptilia
- Order: Squamata
- Suborder: Gekkota
- Family: Eublepharidae
- Genus: Goniurosaurus
- Species: G. varius

Binomial name
- Goniurosaurus varius Qi, Grismer, Lyu, Zhang, Li, & Wang, 2020

= Goniurosaurus varius =

Species of lizard

Goniurosaurus varius, commonly known as the Nanling leopard gecko, is a gecko endemic to China.
