= Goniurosaurus chengzheng =

Scientific classification
- Kingdom: Animalia
- Phylum: Chordata
- Class: Reptilia
- Order: Squamata
- Suborder: Gekkota
- Family: Eublepharidae
- Genus: Goniurosaurus
- Species: G. chengzheng

Binomial name
- Goniurosaurus chengzheng Zhu, Liu, Bai, Roman-Palacios, Li, & He, 2021

Species of lizard

Goniurosaurus chengzheng, also known as the Chengzheng cave gecko, is a gecko endemic to China.
