= Sengoku's gecko =

Scientific classification
- Kingdom: Animalia
- Phylum: Chordata
- Class: Reptilia
- Order: Squamata
- Suborder: Gekkota
- Family: Eublepharidae
- Genus: Goniurosaurus
- Species: G. sengokui

Binomial name
- Goniurosaurus sengokui (Honda & Ota, 2017)

Species of lizard

Sengoku's gecko (Goniurosaurus sengokui) is a species of gecko. It is endemic to the Ryukyu Islands of Japan and only found on two islands in the Okinawa group: Tokashiki Island and Aka Island.
