= Goniurosaurus gezhi =

Scientific classification
- Kingdom: Animalia
- Phylum: Chordata
- Class: Reptilia
- Order: Squamata
- Suborder: Gekkota
- Family: Eublepharidae
- Genus: Goniurosaurus
- Species: G. gezhi

Binomial name
- Goniurosaurus gezhi Zhu, He, & Li, 2020

Species of lizard

Goniurosaurus gezhi, commonly known as the Gezhi cave gecko, is a gecko endemic to China.
