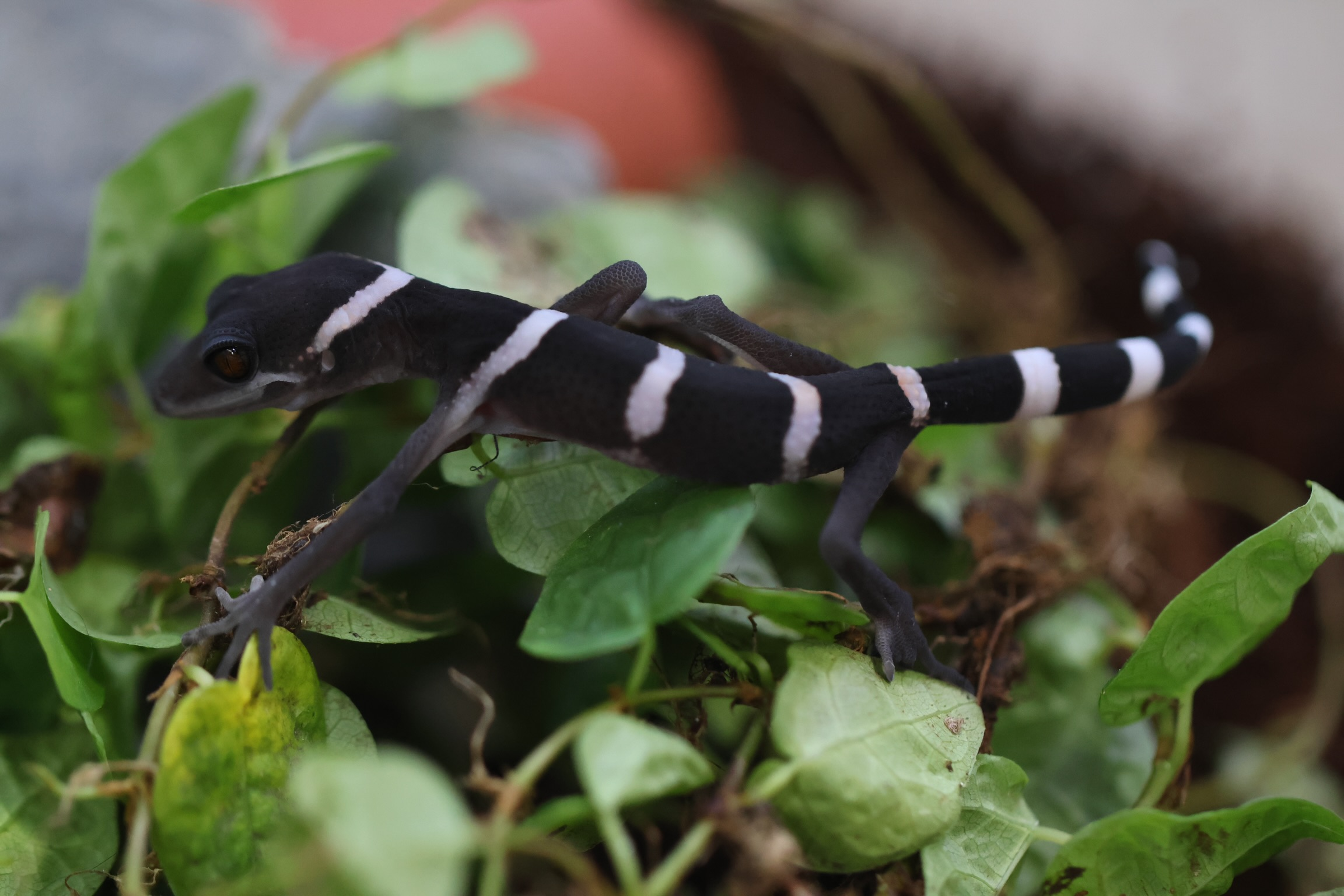
- Found in Vietnam

Conservation status
- Critically Endangered (IUCN 3.1)

Scientific classification
- Kingdom: Animalia
- Phylum: Chordata
- Class: Reptilia
- Order: Squamata
- Suborder: Gekkota
- Family: Eublepharidae
- Genus: Goniurosaurus
- Species: G. huuliensis

Binomial name
- Goniurosaurus huuliensis Orlov, Ryabov, Nguyen, Nguyen, & Ho, 2008

= Goniurosaurus huuliensis =

Species of lizard

Goniurosaurus huuliensis is a gecko endemic to Vietnam.
