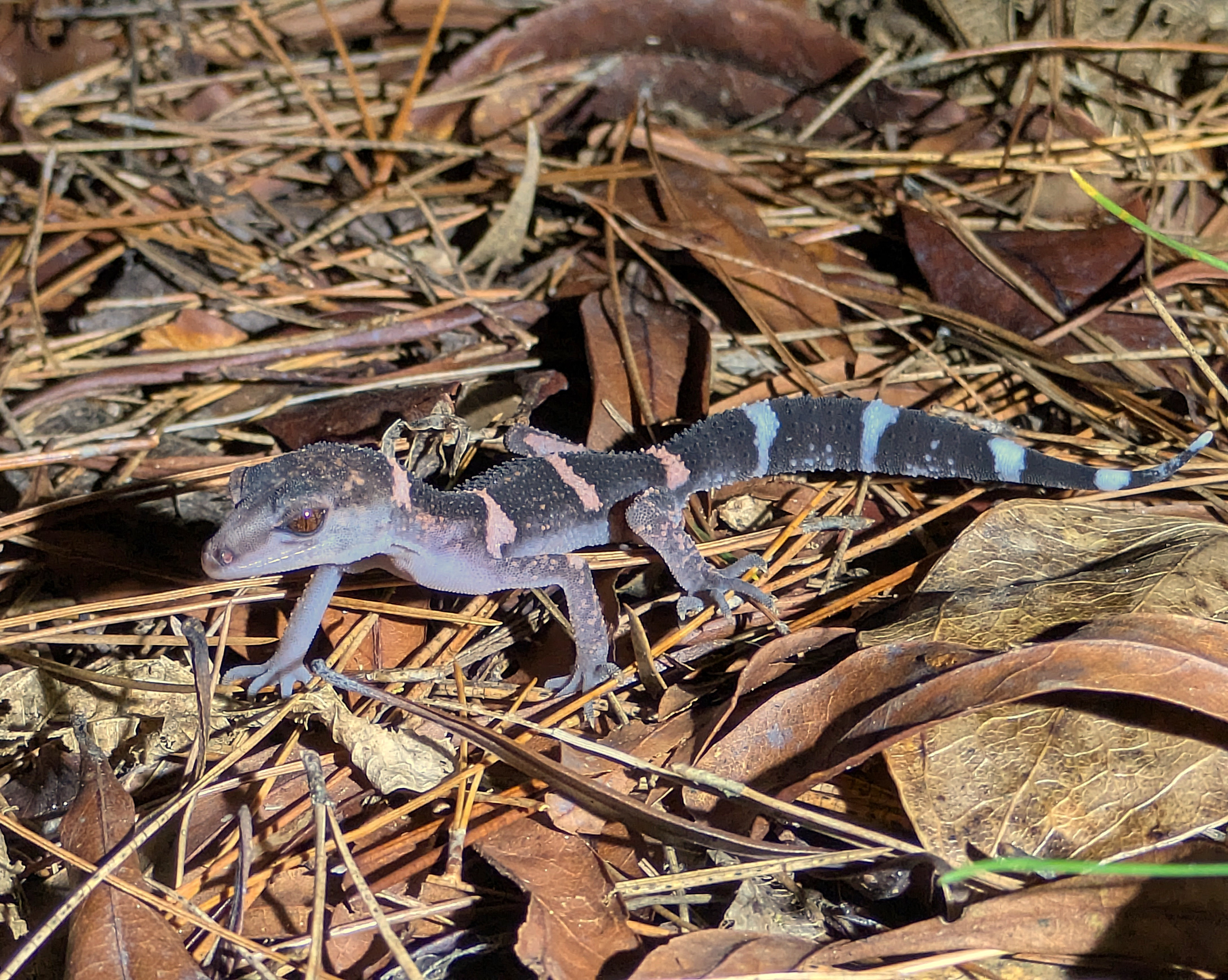

Conservation status
- Endangered (IUCN 3.1)

Scientific classification
- Kingdom: Animalia
- Phylum: Chordata
- Class: Reptilia
- Order: Squamata
- Suborder: Gekkota
- Family: Eublepharidae
- Genus: Goniurosaurus
- Species: G. splendens

Binomial name
- Goniurosaurus splendens (Nakamura & Uano, 1959)

Synonyms
- Eublepharis splendens; Eublepharis kuroiwae splendens; Amamisaurus splendens; Goniurosaurus kuroiwae splendens

= Banded ground gecko =

Species of lizard

The banded ground gecko (Goniurosaurus splendens) is a gecko. It is endemic to Tokunoshima in the Ryukyu Islands of Japan.
