= Goniurosaurus kadoorieorum =

Conservation status
- Endangered (IUCN 3.1)

Scientific classification
- Kingdom: Animalia
- Phylum: Chordata
- Class: Reptilia
- Order: Squamata
- Suborder: Gekkota
- Family: Eublepharidae
- Genus: Goniurosaurus
- Species: G. kadoorieorum

Binomial name
- Goniurosaurus kadoorieorum Yang & Chan, 2015

Species of lizard

Goniurosaurus kadoorieorum, sometimes known as Kadoories's cave gecko, is a gecko endemic to China. Through DNA testing, it is supported that Goniurosaurus kadoorieorum is the same as Goniurosaurus luii.
