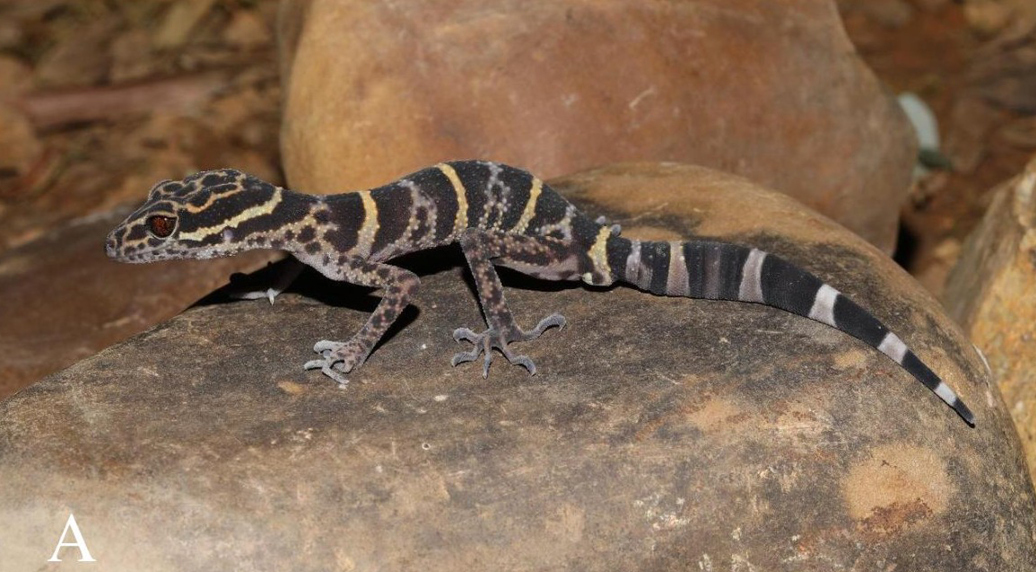
- Male
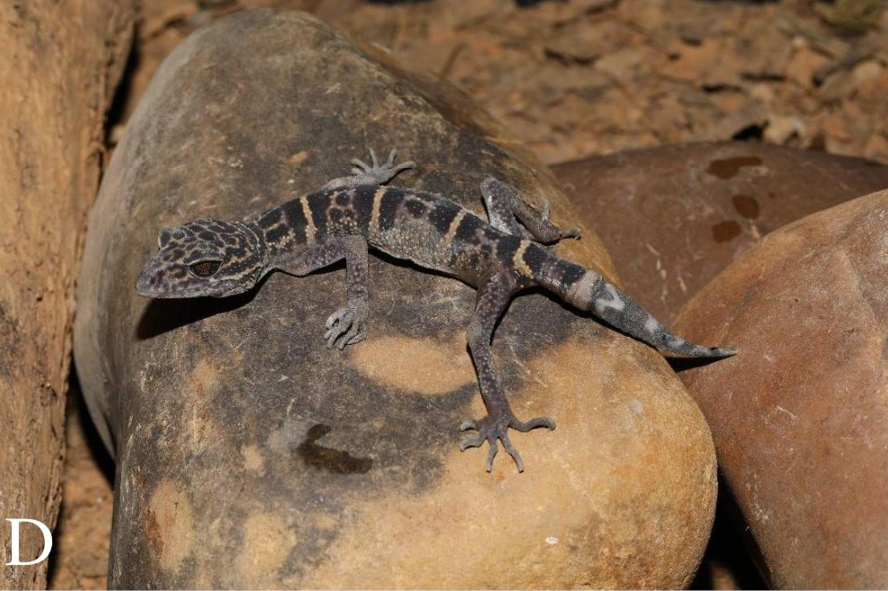
- Female

Scientific classification
- Kingdom: Animalia
- Phylum: Chordata
- Class: Reptilia
- Order: Squamata
- Suborder: Gekkota
- Family: Eublepharidae
- Genus: Goniurosaurus
- Species: G. wuzhengjuni

Binomial name
- Goniurosaurus wuzhengjuni Chen & Chen, 2026

= Goniurosaurus wuzhengjuni =

Species of lizard

Goniurosaurus wuzhengjuni is a species of gecko that belongs to the family Eublepharidae (eyelid geckos). It is native to the Guangxi province of China.

== Description ==
The dorsal regions of the head and body are grayish-white. The limbs are of similar color but densely covered in irregular black blotches.

== Taxonomy ==
It belongs to the suborder Gekkota and more specifically a member of the family Eublepharidae, also known as the eyelid geckos. Phylogenetic analyses of this species show that it is part of the a G. luii species group with species G. araneus being the sister species.

== Discovery ==
The species was described on 2026 with the holotype being GXNU 2025101603, an adult male. They were collected at 25.0636°N, 109.7391°E which is located in the Baishou Nature Reserve in Yongfu County of the Guangxi Zhuang Autonomous Region, China. Also collected were three adult female paratypes.
