= Goniurosaurus kwanghua =

Scientific classification
- Domain: Eukaryota
- Kingdom: Animalia
- Phylum: Chordata
- Class: Reptilia
- Order: Squamata
- Infraorder: Gekkota
- Family: Eublepharidae
- Genus: Goniurosaurus
- Species: G. kwanghua

Binomial name
- Goniurosaurus kwanghua Zhu & He, 2020

Species of lizard

The Kwanghua Cave gecko (Goniurosaurus kwanghua) is a species of geckos endemic to Hainan Island, China.
