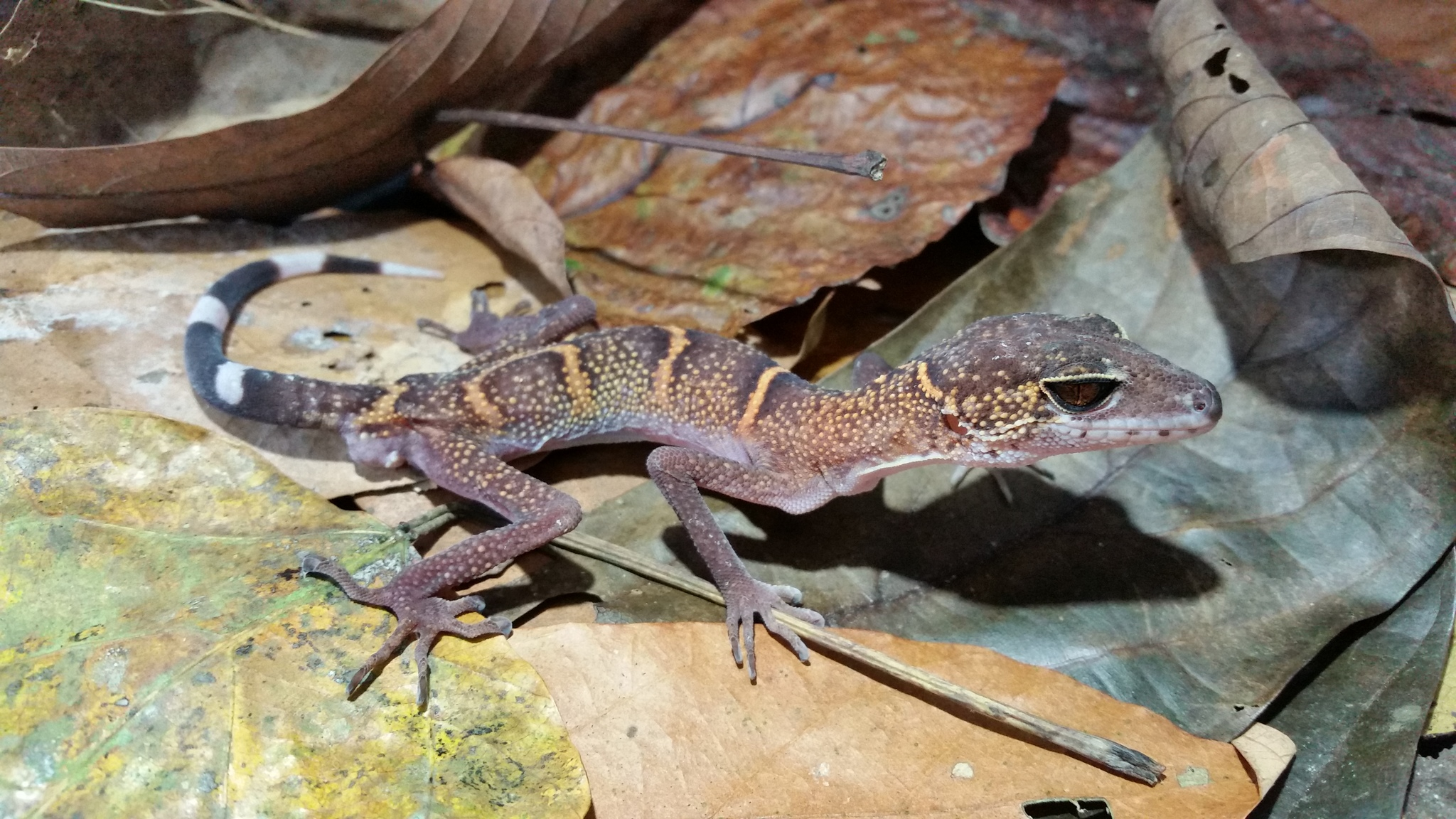

Conservation status
- Endangered (IUCN 3.1)

Scientific classification
- Kingdom: Animalia
- Phylum: Chordata
- Class: Reptilia
- Order: Squamata
- Suborder: Gekkota
- Family: Eublepharidae
- Genus: Goniurosaurus
- Species: G. catbaensis

Binomial name
- Goniurosaurus catbaensis Ziegler, Truong, Schmitz, Stenke & Rösler, 2008

= Goniurosaurus catbaensis =

Species of lizard

Goniurosaurus catbaensis, also known as the Cat Ba leopard gecko or Cat Ba tiger gecko, is a gecko endemic to Cát Bà Island in Vietnam. It is in the species group, luii, within the genus Goniruosaurus, which is within the family, Eublepharidae. Goniurosaurus catbaensis is an endangered species threatened by human-caused activities and is primarily found on limestone. Their morphology consists of a thin body and limbs with thin, yellow bands on the body and thin, white bands on the tail. Goniurosaurus catbaensis is primarily nocturnal and population sizes have been recorded as small but stable.

== Etymology ==
The species epithet 'catbaensis' in Goniurosaurus catbaensis comes from the location, Cat Ba Island, where the gecko is found. The name Goniurosaurus catbaensis references the Biosphere Reserve Cat Ba Archipelago in Vietnam. The Biosphere Reserve Cat Ba Archipelago consists of primarily limestone and is where Goniurosaurus catbaensis is located. The common name for the gecko is 'Cat Ba tiger gecko'.

== Morphology ==
Goniurosaurus catbaensis is best described as having a gracile body and limbs with three to four thin, yellow bands located between the arms and the legs. Its nuchal loop is posteriorly protracted and thin, compared to other geckos in its genus. The thin, yellow bands are outlined both anteriorly and posteriorly with a thin, dark colored border. The iris color of G.catbaensis is an orangeish-brown, and compared to other geckos in its genus, its axillary pockets are deeper. There are four to five thin, white bands on the tail of the gecko, and the base color of the gecko's body is between a dark brown to a grey brown. Juvenile geckos' snout to vent length is less than 85mm. Subadults, geckos who have passed the juvenile stage but are not fully developed to be considered within the adult stage, have a snout to vent length that ranges between 85mm and 105mm. Adult geckos have a snout to vent length that is greater than 105mm. Male and female geckos do not exhibit sexual dimorphism as there is no obvious differences in size or morphology.

=== Comparisons with Goniurosaurus luii ===
Goniurosaurus luii, found in continental, Northern Vietnam, is closely related to Goniurosaurus catbaensis. However, when compared to each other, G.catbaensis lacks internasal scales and the top of its head has a dark marbling pattern compared to G.luii's dark brown blotches head pattern.

== Habitat ==
Goniurosaurus catbaensis lives in the microhabitat of limestone rocks, hills, cliffs, and caves. They can be found primarily in poor secondary forests, forests that are not fully developed after a disturbance, that are on limestone hills and on the forest floor within entrances of limestone caves where forest vegetation is present. They have also been spotted in bamboo forests on Cat Ba Island. They prefer temperatures between 20.6 -30.5°C and humidity levels between 67-90%, and are rarely observed in colder, dry months. Goniurosaurus catbaensis tends to be within 10m from a karst rock.

== Population ==
They are endemic to Cat Ba Island, located in the Gulf of Tonkin in Northern Vietnam. Some have been spotted, though, in smaller islands 1.2km-13km away from Cat Ba Island in the Ha Long Bay. Population sizes observed have all been small. Despite being small, recent data has found that the populations are stable and appear to be actively reproducing. In both Goniurosaurus catbaensis and its closely related Goniurosaurus luii the female geckos are the dominant sex in the population.

=== Behavior ===
Goniurosaurus catbaensis is nocturnal with evening to late-night hours producing the most activity. Females are gravid, pregnant, between the months of May to July. They are oviparous in terms of reproduction.

== Conservation ==
=== Conservation status ===
They are listed as endangered by the IUCN. It was last assessed in 2016.

=== Anthropogenic threats ===
In recent years Goniurosaurus catbaensis has faced numerous anthropogenic threats. Because this species has been collected and used for traditional medicine, its population size has been subject to poaching. Since the 1990s, tiger geckos have been found in the international pet trade market, and the Cat Ba Tiger Gecko has been found there in recent years. It is considered important in the pet trade in US, Japan, and the European Union, as well as showing up in pet shops local to Cat Ba Island. Dealers pay local villagers to collect the Cat Ba tiger gecko for international trade. The habitat of Goniurosaurus catbaensis has also been fragmented and destroyed because of tourism expansion in Vietnam. Tourism companies in Vietnam have been creating experiences for tourists to enjoy parties in the limestone caves that the gecko lives in, this has negatively affected Goniurosaurus catbaensis, as the events are hosted at evening when the gecko is active. Habitat destruction, for urbanization and agriculture, of karst rocks has impacted Goniurosaurus catbaensis negatively, as G.catbaensis distribution range is on karst and limestone. All of these factors have been threatening the population of the gecko.

=== Current conservation efforts ===
As of November 2018, training programs held by the IUCN Vietnam have been occurring to help the monitoring skills of researchers and to better protect the populations of Goniurosarus catbaensis. Goniurosaurus catbaensis has been included in group 11B of the Governmental Decree 06/2019/ND-CP in Vietnam. This decree prohibits the collection and trade of the species listed if the person does not have permits in Vietnam.

=== Potential conservation efforts ===
Ex-situ conservation breeding program is recommended for Goniurosaurus catbaensis to help keep the population stable. More monitoring of the patterns of trade of G.catbaensis is recommended, as well as inclusion of all Goniurosaurus species in CITES, the Convention on International Trade in Endangered Species of Wild Fauna and Flora.

== See also ==
- Tourism in Vietnam
- Wildlife trade
