= Goniurosaurus sinensis =

Scientific classification
- Kingdom: Animalia
- Phylum: Chordata
- Class: Reptilia
- Order: Squamata
- Suborder: Gekkota
- Family: Eublepharidae
- Genus: Goniurosaurus
- Species: G. sinensis

Binomial name
- Goniurosaurus sinensis Zhou, Peng, Hou, & Yuan, 2019

Species of lizard

Goniurosaurus sinensis is a species of gecko endemic to Hainan Island, China.
