= Zhou's leopard gecko =

Conservation status
- Data Deficient (IUCN 3.1)

Scientific classification
- Kingdom: Animalia
- Phylum: Chordata
- Class: Reptilia
- Order: Squamata
- Suborder: Gekkota
- Family: Eublepharidae
- Genus: Goniurosaurus
- Species: G. zhoui

Binomial name
- Goniurosaurus zhoui Zhou, Wang, Chen, & Liang, 2018

Species of lizard

Zhou's leopard gecko (Goniurosaurus zhoui) is a species of geckos endemic to Hainan Island, China.
