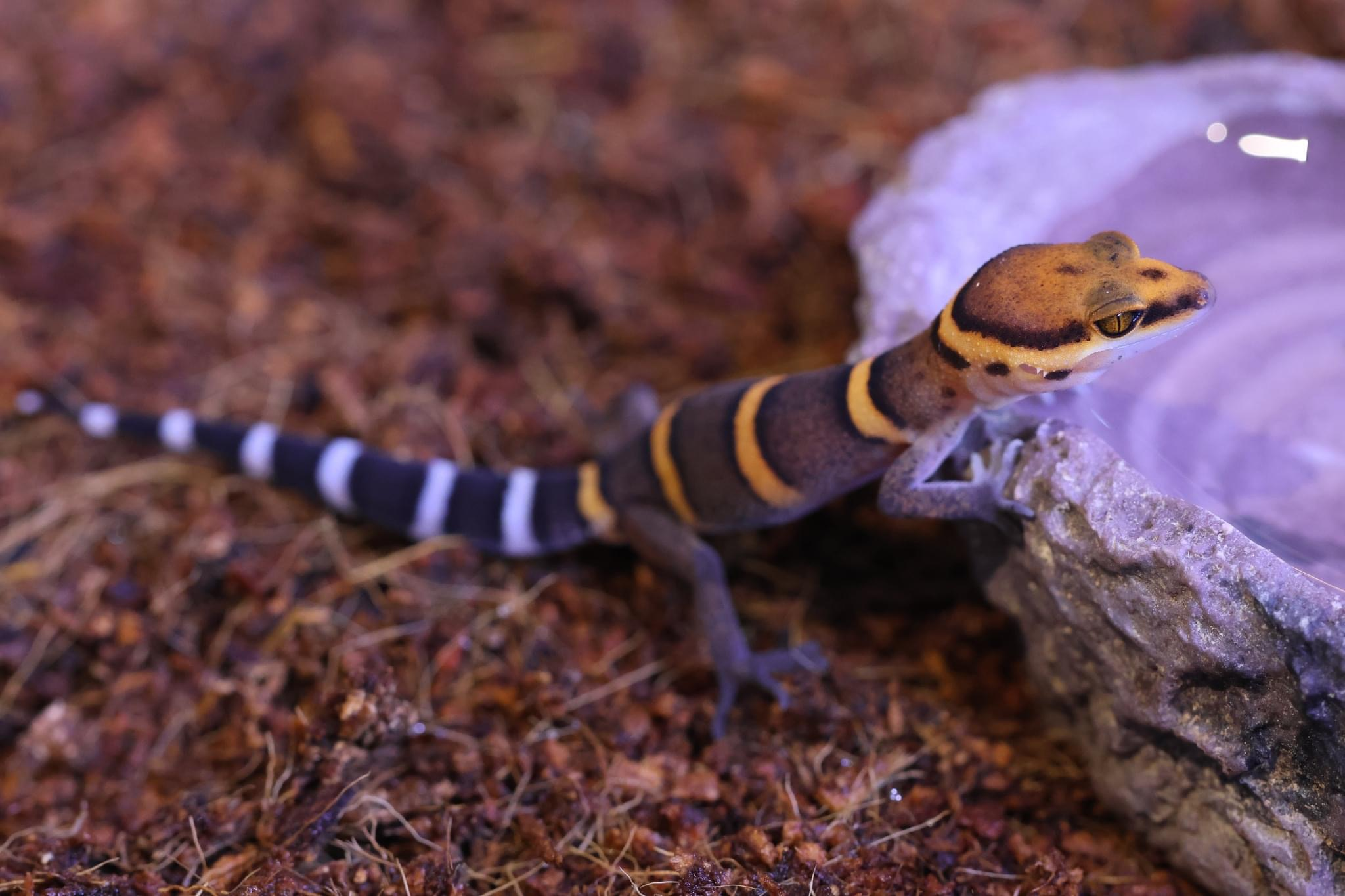

Conservation status
- Endangered (IUCN 3.1)

Scientific classification
- Kingdom: Animalia
- Phylum: Chordata
- Class: Reptilia
- Order: Squamata
- Suborder: Gekkota
- Family: Eublepharidae
- Genus: Goniurosaurus
- Species: G. bawanglingensis

Binomial name
- Goniurosaurus bawanglingensis Grismer, Haitao, Orlov & Anajeva, 2002

= Goniurosaurus bawanglingensis =

Species of lizard

Goniurosaurus bawanglingensis is a species of geckos endemic to the Hainan Bawangling National Nature Reserve in the southwest part of Hainan Island, China.
