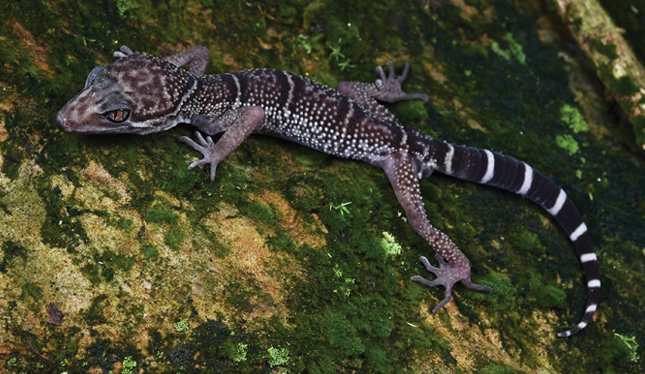

Conservation status
- Endangered (IUCN 3.1)

Scientific classification
- Kingdom: Animalia
- Phylum: Chordata
- Class: Reptilia
- Order: Squamata
- Suborder: Gekkota
- Family: Eublepharidae
- Genus: Goniurosaurus
- Species: G. zhelongi

Binomial name
- Goniurosaurus zhelongi Wang, Jin, Li, & Grismer, 2014

= Goniurosaurus zhelongi =

Species of lizard

Goniurosaurus zhelongi, also called the Zhe-long's leopard gecko, is a gecko endemic to China.
