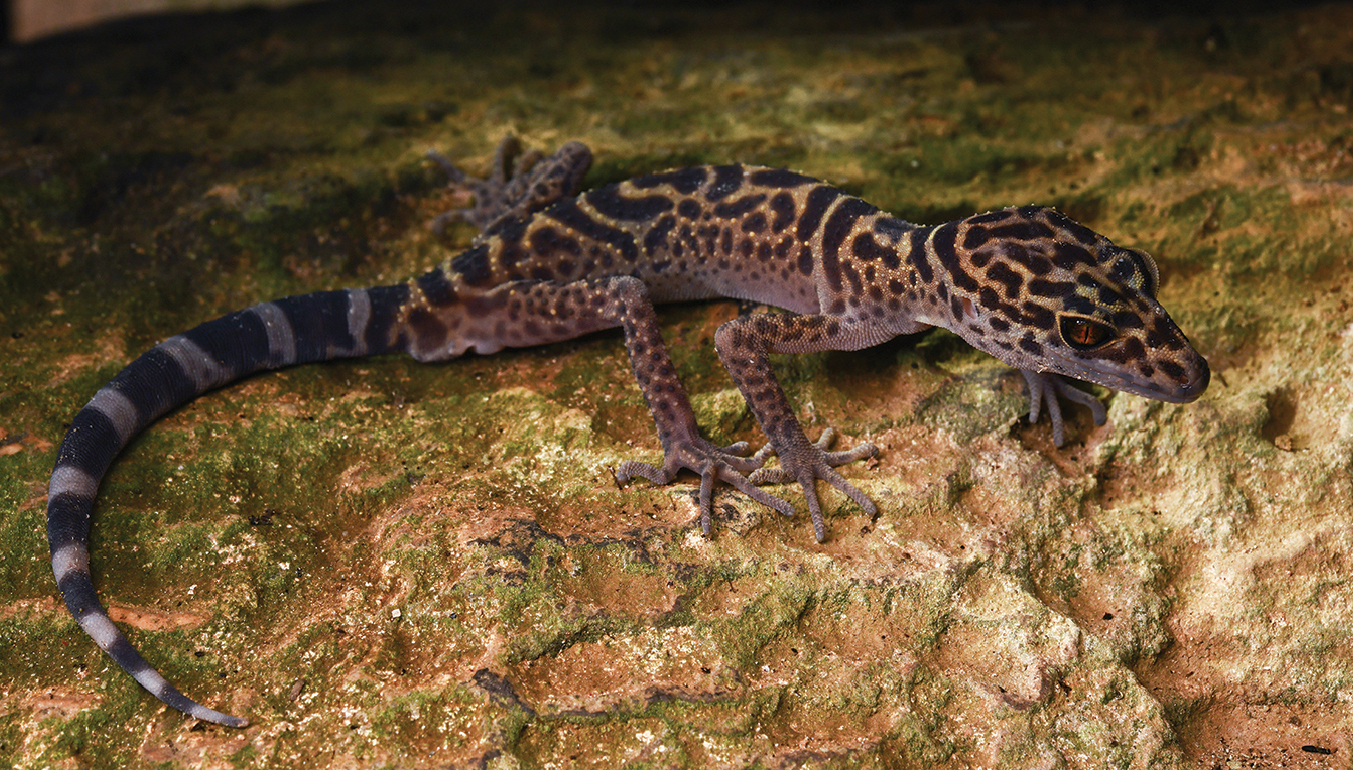

Scientific classification
- Kingdom: Animalia
- Phylum: Chordata
- Class: Reptilia
- Order: Squamata
- Suborder: Gekkota
- Family: Eublepharidae
- Genus: Goniurosaurus
- Species: G. gollum

Binomial name
- Goniurosaurus gollum Qi, Grismer, Chen, Lyu, & Wang, 2020

= Goniurosaurus gollum =

Species of lizard

Goniurosaurus gollum, commonly known as the Gollum leopard gecko, is a gecko endemic to China.
