= Vietnamese leopard gecko =

Vietnamese Tiger gecko

Conservation status
- Endangered (IUCN 3.1)

Scientific classification
- Kingdom: Animalia
- Phylum: Chordata
- Class: Reptilia
- Order: Squamata
- Suborder: Gekkota
- Family: Eublepharidae
- Genus: Goniurosaurus
- Species: G. araneus

Binomial name
- Goniurosaurus araneus Grismer, Viets & Boyle 1999

Species of lizard

The Vietnamese leopard gecko or Chinese tiger gecko (Goniurosaurus araneus) is a species of lizards in the family Eublepharidae. It is found in the Cao Bằng Province of Vietnam and Guangxi in China. The scientific species name, is from the Latin, aranea, which means "spider", due to the spindly, spider-like form of this species.

== Description ==
The Vietnamese tiger gecko is dark gray in color and has many black spots and four wide orange bands across the back. Its eyes are dark reddish brown. Goniurosaurus araneus is distinguished from other species of the same genus by its elongated dorsal scales. This gecko has a maximum length (including tail) of 190 mm (7.5 in).

== Habitat ==
The habitat of the Vietnamese tiger gecko is primarily rocky. It is found in humid and shady areas and in mountainous terrain or near caves.
