= Goniurosaurus kwangsiensis =

Conservation status
- Endangered (IUCN 3.1)

Scientific classification
- Kingdom: Animalia
- Phylum: Chordata
- Class: Reptilia
- Order: Squamata
- Suborder: Gekkota
- Family: Eublepharidae
- Genus: Goniurosaurus
- Species: G. kwangsiensis

Binomial name
- Goniurosaurus kwangsiensis Yang & Chan, 2015

Species of lizard

Goniurosaurus kwangsiensis, sometimes known as the Guangxi cave gecko, is a gecko endemic to China.
