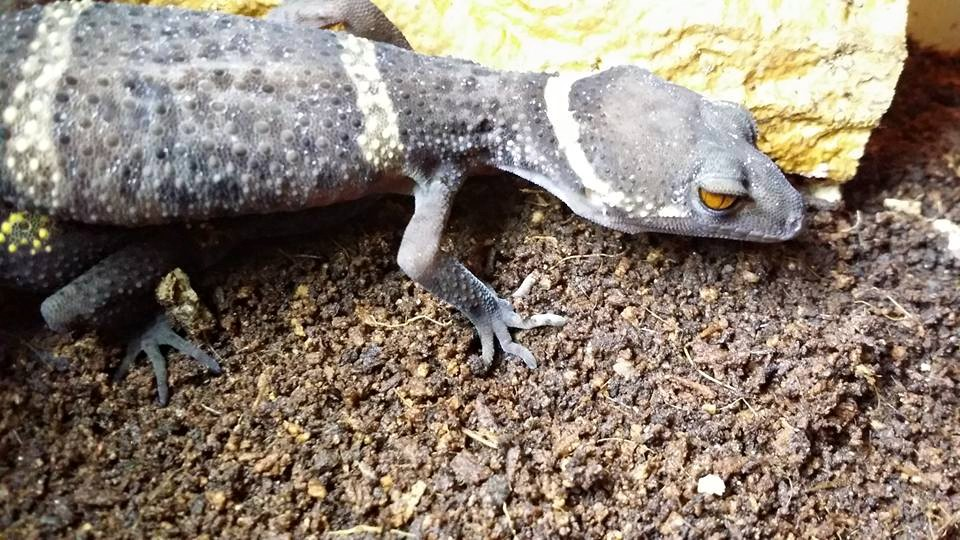

Conservation status
- Vulnerable (IUCN 3.1)

Scientific classification
- Kingdom: Animalia
- Phylum: Chordata
- Class: Reptilia
- Order: Squamata
- Suborder: Gekkota
- Family: Eublepharidae
- Genus: Goniurosaurus
- Species: G. lichtenfelderi

Binomial name
- Goniurosaurus lichtenfelderi (Mocquard, 1897)

Synonyms
- Eublepharis lichtenfelderi Mocquard, 1897; Goniurosaurus lichtenfelderi — Börner, 1981; Goniurosaurus murphyi Orlov & Darevsky, 1999; Goniurosaurus lichtenfelderi — Seufer et al., 2005

= Lichtenfelder's gecko =

Species of lizard

Lichtenfelder's gecko (Goniurosaurus lichtenfelderi) is a species of lizard in the family Eublepharidae. The species is native to southeastern Asia.

== Geographic range and taxonomy ==
G. lichtenfelderi is found in southern China (including Hainan) and Vietnam. However, the IUCN considers Chinese populations as belonging to other species.

== Etymology ==
The specific name, lichtenfelderi, is in honor of engineer Charles Lichtenfelder, who collected the type specimen.

== Description ==
G. lichtenfelderi is basically purple in colour. It is crossbanded by five thick yellow stripes, which are edged on either side by black bands of equal width. This pattern is the same along its tail, with the yellow changing to white in the central bands. The top of the head of this gecko is brown. The body shape of this species is very similar to that of the leopard gecko, Eublepharis macularius.

== Habitat ==
The preferred natural habitat of G. lichtenfelderi is near streams in forest, at altitudes of 100–600 m (330–1,970 ft).

== Reproduction ==
G. lichtenfelderi is oviparous.
