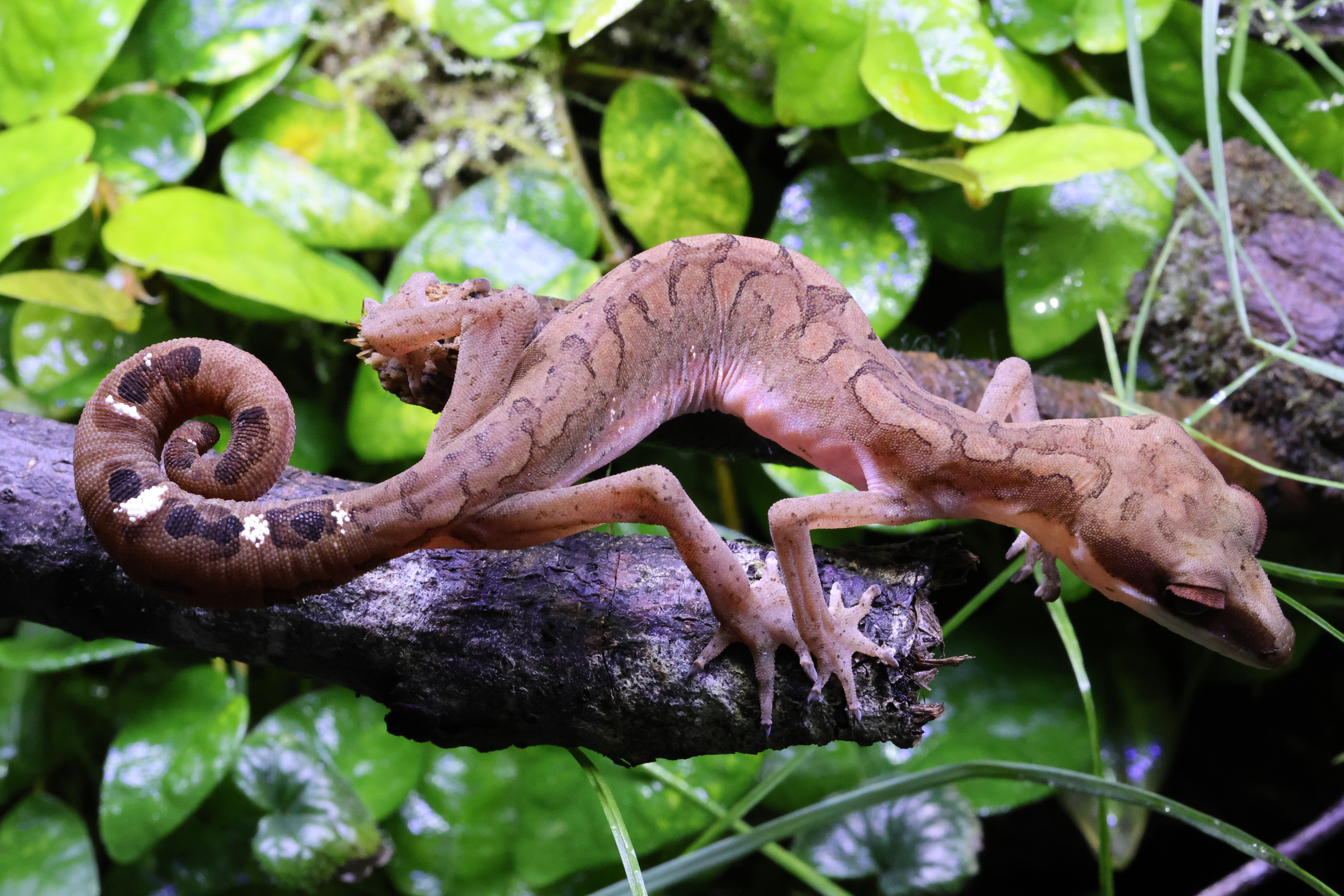

Conservation status
- Least Concern (IUCN 3.1)

Scientific classification
- Domain: Eukaryota
- Kingdom: Animalia
- Phylum: Chordata
- Class: Reptilia
- Order: Squamata
- Infraorder: Gekkota
- Superfamily: Gekkonoidea
- Family: Eublepharidae
- Genus: Aeluroscalabotes; Boulenger, 1885
- Species: A. felinus

Binomial name
- Aeluroscalabotes felinus Günther, 1864

Synonyms
- Pentadactylus felinus Pentadactylus borneensis Pentadactylus dorsalis Aelurosaurus felinus Aelurosaurus dorsalis Aeluroscalabotes longicaudatus Aeluroscalabotes dorsalis

= Cat gecko =

Species of lizard

The cat gecko (Aeluroscalabotes felinus) is a species of gecko found in Indonesia, Malaysia, Singapore, Cambodia and Thailand. It is the only species within the genus Aeluroscalabotes. It is commonly called the cat gecko because of its habit of curling up with its tail around itself when it sleeps, similar to a cat.

== Description ==
The cat gecko is a lightly built gecko, typically red-brown in color with white spots on its body, and solid white under its chin, and sometimes to the belly. Some specimens have brown blotching along the back. It is considered to be one of the more primitive geckos, and is physically quite similar in body structure to the few fossils of early geckos which have been discovered. They can grow to approximately 18 cm (7 inches), with males being smaller than females.

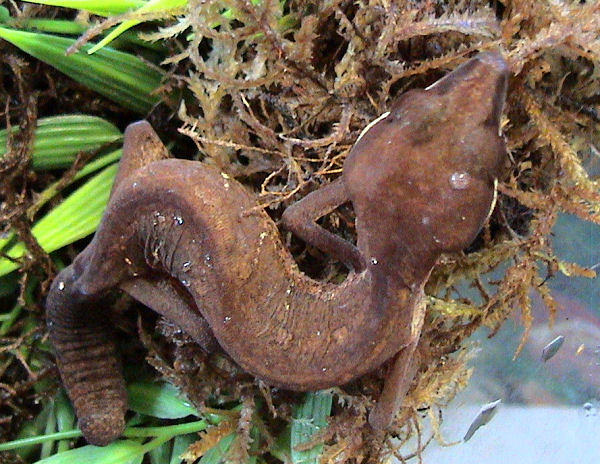

== Behavior ==
Semi-arboreal and preferring cool, humid, montane rainforest habitats, the cat gecko is primarily nocturnal and insectivorous, consuming a wide variety of small insects and other arthropods.

== Taxonomy ==
The species has been redescribed by several different taxonomists, leading to some early confusion in its classification, but its distinctly different morphological characteristics have clarified its status.

There are two recognized subspecies of Aeluroscalabotes felinus:

- Aeluroscalabotes felinus felinus (Günther, 1864)
- Aeluroscalabotes felinus multituberculatus (Kopstein, 1927)

== In captivity ==
The cat gecko is occasionally kept as a pet gecko, though they are not very commonly available and captive breeding is known to be difficult. Wild caught specimens often have heavy parasite loads, and they are easily susceptible to stress, so care can be difficult.

== Conservation status ==
Exact population counts of the cat gecko are unknown, though it is not considered to be common throughout its range. It does not hold any particular conservation status, except in Thailand, where collection and export is prohibited.
