= Goniurosaurus liboensis =

Conservation status
- Endangered (IUCN 3.1)

Scientific classification
- Kingdom: Animalia
- Phylum: Chordata
- Class: Reptilia
- Order: Squamata
- Suborder: Gekkota
- Family: Eublepharidae
- Genus: Goniurosaurus
- Species: G. liboensis

Binomial name
- Goniurosaurus liboensis Wang, Yang, & Grismer, 2013

Species of lizard

Goniurosaurus liboensis is a species of geckos endemic to China.
