= Goniurosaurus =

Scientific classification
- Kingdom: Animalia
- Phylum: Chordata
- Class: Reptilia
- Order: Squamata
- Suborder: Gekkota
- Family: Eublepharidae
- Genus: Goniurosaurus; Barbour, 1908

Species
- 27 recognized species, see article.

Genus of lizards

Goniurosaurus is a genus of geckos in the family Eublepharidae. The genus contains 27 species. Members species are known by various common names including cave geckos, ground geckos, leopard geckos, and tiger geckos. Members of this genus are found in China, Japan, and Vietnam. For this reason they are also known commonly as Asian geckos.

== Diet ==
Geckos of the genus Goniurosaurus mainly feed on small insects.

== Species ==
The following 27 species are recognized as being valid.

They can be divided into four species groups.

=== luii group ===
Species	Authority	Common Name(s)	Distribution	Conservation Status
Goniurosaurus araneus	Grismer et al., 1999	Vietnamese Leopard Gecko	Cao Bằng Province,Vietnam & Guangxi, China	Endangered (IUCN 3.1)
Goniurosaurus bawanglingensis	Grismer et al., 2002	Bawangling Leopard Gecko	Hainan, China	Endangered (IUCN 3.1)
Goniurosaurus catbaensis	Ziegler, Nguyen, Schmitz, Stenke & Rösler, 2008	Cat Ba Leopard Gecko/Cat Ba Tiger Gecko	Cát Bà Island,Vietnam	Endangered (IUCN 3.1)
Goniurosaurus chengzheng	Zhu, Li & He in Zhu et al., 2021	Chengzheng Cave Gecko	China	Not evaluated
Goniurosaurus gezhi	Zhu, He & Li, 2020	Gezhi Cave Gecko	China	Not evaluated
Goniurosaurus huuliensis	Orlov et al., 2008		NE Vietnam	Critically Endangered (IUCN 3.1)
Goniurosaurus luii	Orlov et al., 2008	Chinese Leopard Gecko	Guangxi & Hainan, China, Cao Bang & Lang Son, Vietnam, both of which are in extreme northern Vietnam.	Vulnerable (IUCN 3.1)
Goniurosaurus liboensis	Grismer et al., 1999	Libo Leopard Gecko	China	Endangered (IUCN 3.1)
Goniurosaurus kadoorieorum	Yang & Chan, 2015	Kadoories's cave gecko	China	Endangered (IUCN 3.1)
Goniurosaurus kwangsiensis	Yang & Chan, 2015	Guangxi cave gecko	Guangxi, China	Endangered (IUCN 3.1)
Goniurosaurus wuzhengjuni	Chen & Chen, 2026		Guangxi, China	Not evaluated

=== lichtenfelderi group ===
Species	Authority	Common Name(s)	Distribution	Conservation Status
Goniurosaurus hainanensis (Note: Goniurosaurus kwanghua (Zhu & He, 2020) and Goniurosaurus sinensis (Zhou, Peng, Hou & Yuan, 2019) have been determined to be the same species.)	Barbour, 1908	Chinese cave gecko/Hainan cave gecko	Hainan, China	Near Threatened (IUCN 3.1)
Goniurosaurus lichtenfelderi	(Mocquard, 1897)	Lichtenfelder's gecko	Hainan, China & Vietnam	Vulnerable (IUCN 3.1)
Goniurosaurus zhoui	Zhou, N. Wang, Chen & Liang, 2018	Zhou's leopard gecko	Hainan China	Not evaluated

Nota bene: In the above list, a binomial authority in parentheses indicates that the species was originally described in a genus other than Goniurosaurus.

=== kuroiwae group ===
Species	Authority	Common Name(s)	Distribution	Conservation Status
Goniurosaurus kuroiwae	(Namiye, 1912)	Kuroiwa's ground gecko		
Goniurosaurus nebulozonatus	Kurita & Toda, 2024			
Goniurosaurus orientalis	(Maki, 1931)	Spotted ground gecko		
Goniurosaurus sengokui	Honda & Ota, 2017	Sengoku's gecko		
Goniurosaurus splendens	(Nakamura & Uéno, 1959)	Banded ground gecko		
Goniurosaurus toyamai	Grismer et al., 1994	Iheyajima leopard gecko		
Goniurosaurus yamashinae	(Okada, 1936)	Yamashina's ground gecko		

Nota bene: In the above list, a binomial authority in parentheses indicates that the species was originally described in a genus other than Goniurosaurus.

=== yingdeensis group ===
Species	Authority	Common Name(s)	Distribution	Conservation Status
Goniurosaurus gollum	Qi et al., 2020	Gollum leopard gecko		
Goniurosaurus varius	Qi et al., 2020			
Goniurosaurus wangshu	Zhu et al., 2022	Wangshu's leopard gecko		
Goniurosaurus yingdeensi	Y. Wang et al., 2010	Yingde leopard gecko		
Goniurosaurus zhelongi	Y. Wang et al., 2014	Zhe-long's leopard gecko		
