= Cyrtodactylus cayuensis =

Scientific classification
- Kingdom: Animalia
- Phylum: Chordata
- Class: Reptilia
- Order: Squamata
- Suborder: Gekkota
- Family: Gekkonidae
- Genus: Cyrtodactylus
- Species: C. cayuensis

Binomial name
- Cyrtodactylus cayuensis Li, 2007

Species of lizard

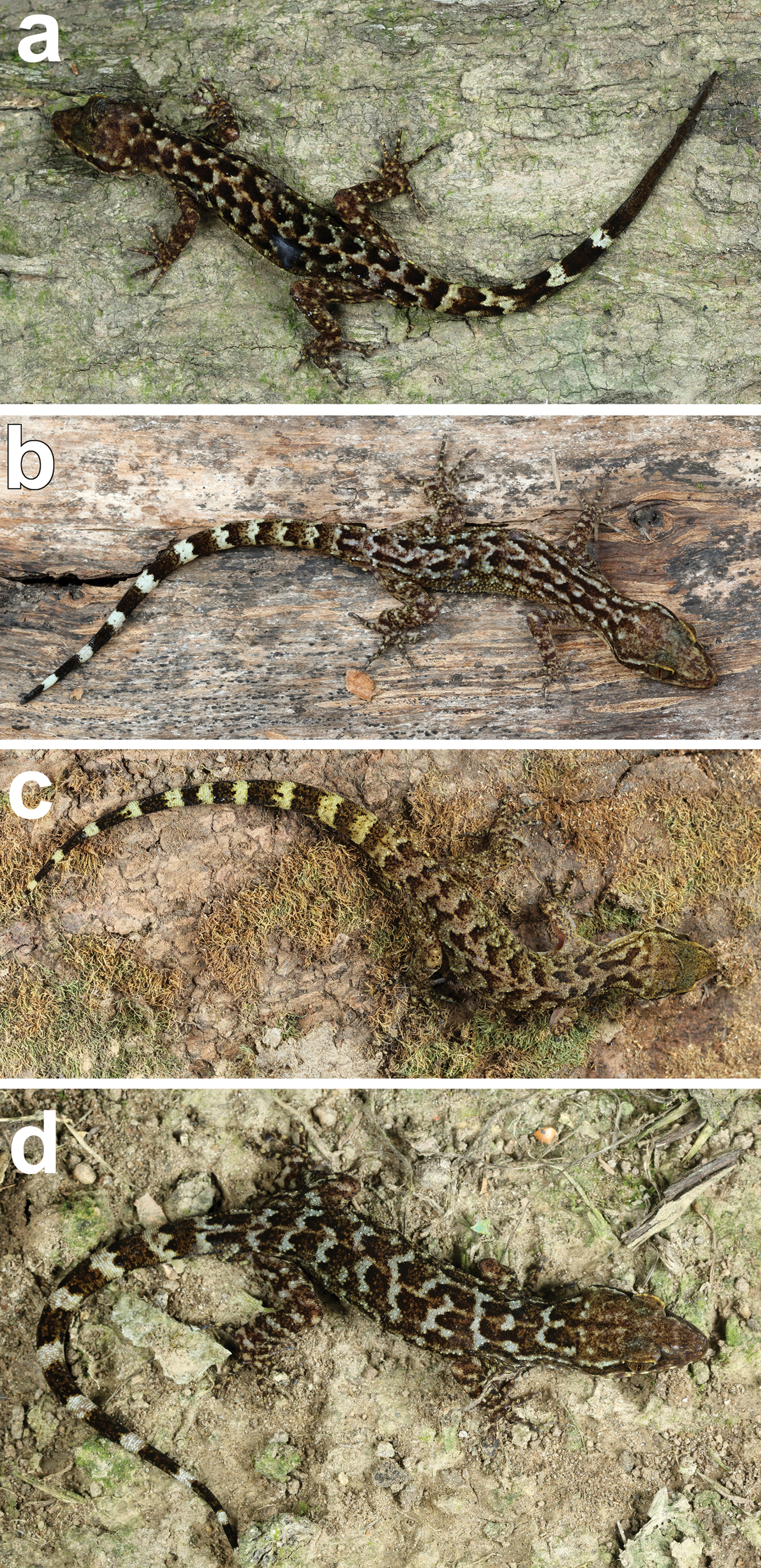
Cyrtodactylus arunachalensis, (a) male holotype BNHS 2775, (b) paratype male BNHS 2777, (c) male NCBS NRC-AA-0008, (d) male BNHS 2778

Cyrtodactylus cayuensis, also known as the Cayu bent-toed gecko, is a species of gecko endemic to China.
