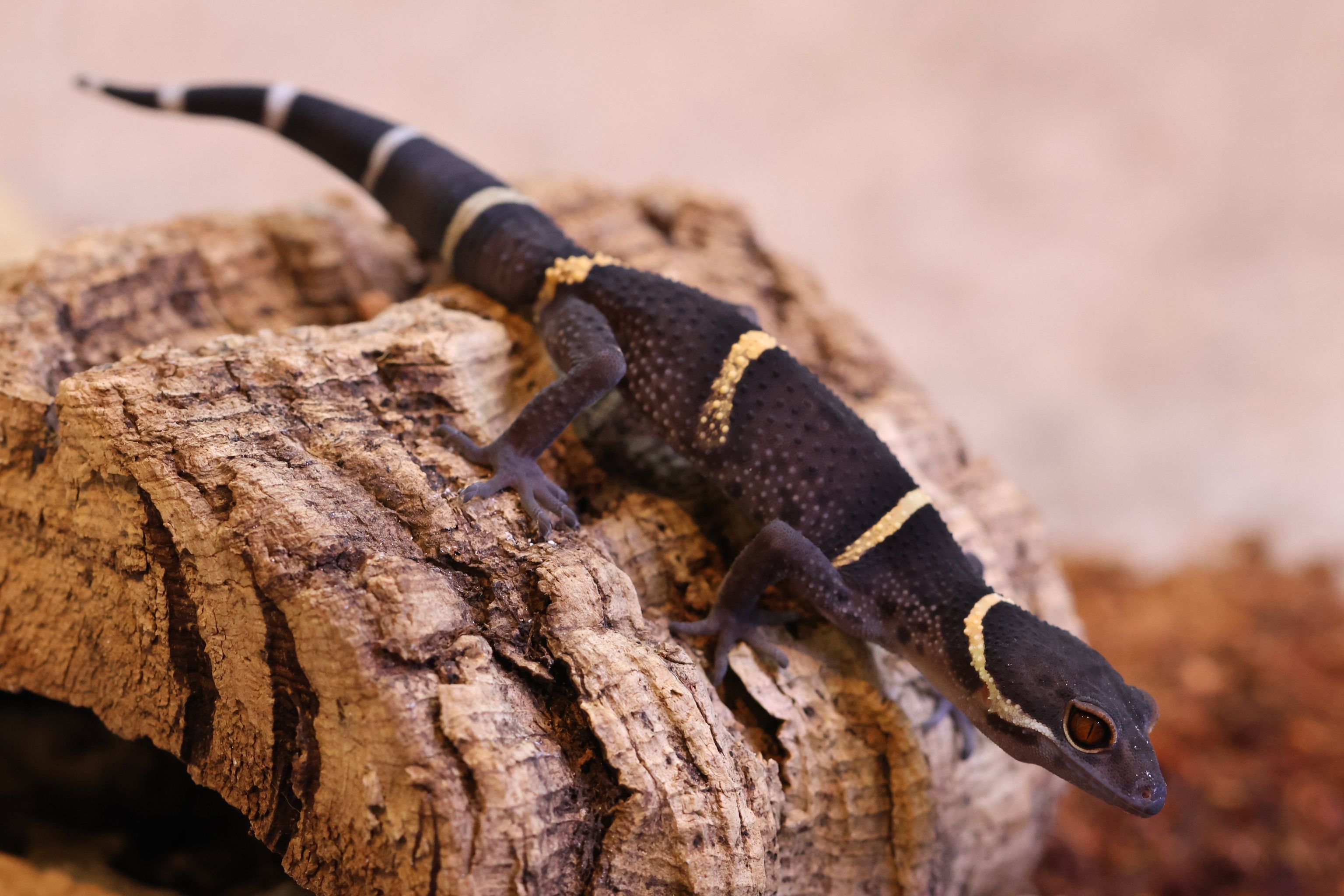
- Goniurosaurus hainanensis

Conservation status
- Near Threatened (IUCN 3.1)

Scientific classification
- Kingdom: Animalia
- Phylum: Chordata
- Class: Reptilia
- Order: Squamata
- Suborder: Gekkota
- Family: Eublepharidae
- Genus: Goniurosaurus
- Species: G. hainanensis

Binomial name
- Goniurosaurus hainanensis Barbour, 1908

Synonyms
- Goniurosaurus lichtenfelderi hainanensis

= Goniurosaurus hainanensis =

Species of lizard

Goniurosaurus hainanensis is a nocturnal species of gecko endemic to the Hainan Island of China. Its common names are the Chinese cave gecko, Hainan cave gecko or simply cave gecko or simply the Chinese leopard gecko. The exotic pet trade has been driving numbers of this rare species down since its categorization in the early 2000s, and could eventually lead to its extinction. In recent years, the population has stabilized.

== Characteristics ==
They can grow to sizes reaching over 23 centimetres (9 in) long, but often average around 8.5 inches (22 cm) and are often found dwelling on the sides of rock formations and forest floors. They have typically large red eyes, ranging from maroon to crimson, with movable eyelids much like the more widely known leopard gecko, another member of the family Eublepharidae. In terms of color, these animals are usually gray with black spots and yellow or orange bands in the dorsal area. Some individuals lose their coloring with age, and wind up a nearly solid gray color. The ventral area is nearly white and translucent. Five clawed fingers allow easy climbing of rocky terrain and rainforest cliffs. Goniurosaurus geckos lack adhesive toepads.

== Captivity ==
Since the 1990s these lizards can often be found at various reptile shows or online animal shops. They are the only Goniurosaurus species regularly available in the commercial pet trade, and captive bred individuals have become the standard for potential owners. This exotic pet trade has been driving poaching and leaves wild populations at risk of extinction. Currently, G. hainanensis is the only recorded Goniurosaurus species that is neither vulnerable nor endangered, having a stable population when assessed in 2019.
