= Barbour's ground skink =

There are two species of skink named Barbour's ground skink:

- Kaestlea travancorica, endemic to southern Western Ghats
- Scincella barbouri, found in China
