= Cyrtodactylus wayakonei =

Conservation status
- Near Threatened (IUCN 3.1)

Scientific classification
- Kingdom: Animalia
- Phylum: Chordata
- Class: Reptilia
- Order: Squamata
- Suborder: Gekkota
- Family: Gekkonidae
- Genus: Cyrtodactylus
- Species: C. wayakonei

Binomial name
- Cyrtodactylus wayakonei T.Q. Nguyen, Kingsada, Rösler, Auer & Ziegler, 2010

Species of lizard

Cyrtodactylus wayakonei is a species of gecko, a lizard in the family Gekkonidae. The species is indigenous to southeastern Asia.

== Etymology ==
The specific name, wayakonei, is in honor of Laotian conservationist Sengdeuane Wayakone.

== Geographic range ==
C. wayakonei is found in northern Laos and in Yunnan Province in southern China.

== Habitat ==
The preferred natural habitats of C. wayakonei are forest and dry caves, at altitudes of 730–810 m (2,400–2,660 ft).

== Description ==
Medium-sized for its genus, C. wayakonei may attain a snout-to-vent length (SVL) of 9 cm (3.5 in).

== Reproduction ==
The mode of reproduction of C. wayakonei is unknown.
