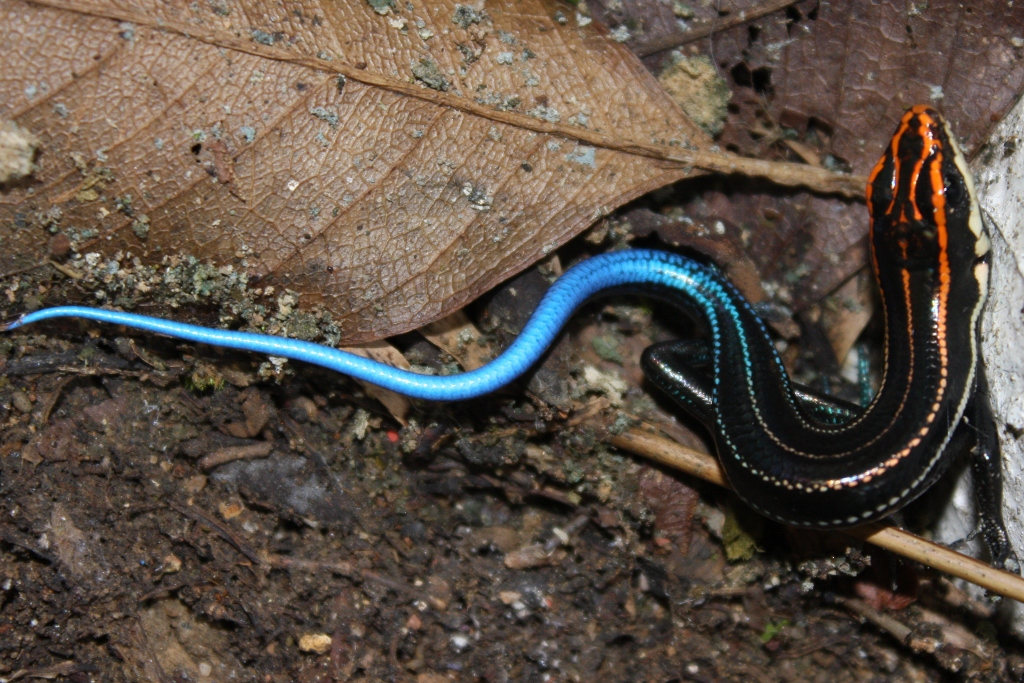
- Near Ho Chung, Sai Kung District, New Territories, Hong Kong.

Conservation status
- Least Concern (IUCN 3.1)

Scientific classification
- Kingdom: Animalia
- Phylum: Chordata
- Class: Reptilia
- Order: Squamata
- Family: Scincidae
- Genus: Plestiodon
- Species: P. elegans

Binomial name
- Plestiodon elegans (Boulenger, 1887)

Synonyms
- Eumeces elegans Boulenger, 1887

= Plestiodon elegans =

Species of lizard

Plestiodon elegans, the five-striped blue-tailed skink or Shanghai elegant skink, is a species of skink. It is found in China, northern Vietnam, Taiwan, and the Senkaku Islands of Japan.
