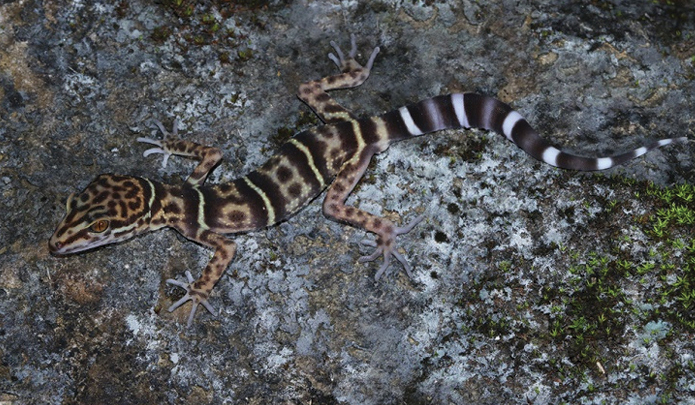

Conservation status
- Critically Endangered (IUCN 3.1)

Scientific classification
- Kingdom: Animalia
- Phylum: Chordata
- Class: Reptilia
- Order: Squamata
- Suborder: Gekkota
- Family: Eublepharidae
- Genus: Goniurosaurus
- Species: G. yingdeensis

Binomial name
- Goniurosaurus yingdeensis Wang, Yang, & Cui, 2010

= Goniurosaurus yingdeensis =

Species of gecko

Goniurosaurus yingdeensis, also called the Yingde leopard gecko, is a gecko endemic to China.
