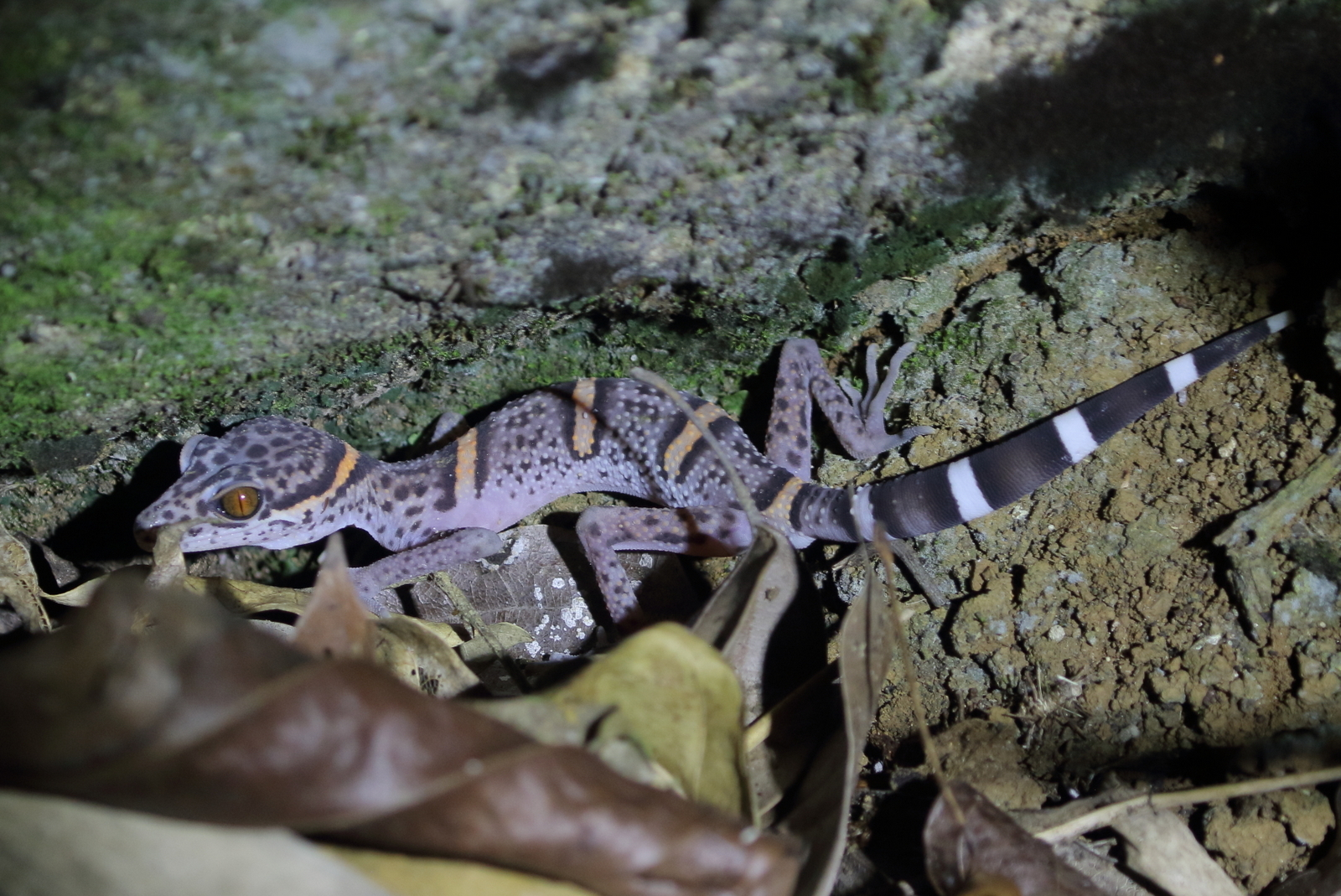

Conservation status
- Vulnerable (IUCN 3.1)

Scientific classification
- Kingdom: Animalia
- Phylum: Chordata
- Class: Reptilia
- Order: Squamata
- Suborder: Gekkota
- Family: Eublepharidae
- Genus: Goniurosaurus
- Species: G. luii

Binomial name
- Goniurosaurus luii Grismer, Viets & Boyle, 1999

= Goniurosaurus luii =

Species of lizard

Goniurosaurus luii is a species of gecko, a lizard in the family Eublepharidae. The species is native to China and Vietnam.

== Etymology ==
The specific name, luii, is in honor of Chinese herpetologist Wai Lui.

== Geographic range ==
In China, Goniurosaurus luii is found in Guangxi region and Hainan province, both of which are in extreme southern China. In Vietnam, it is found in Cao Bang province and Lang Son province, both of which are in extreme northern Vietnam.

== Habitat ==
The preferred natural habitat of Goniurosaurus luii is limestone caves in forest, at altitudes of 100–700 m (330–2,300 ft).

== Description ==
Dorsally, G. luii is dark bluish brown, with widely spaced, narrow white crossbands on the head, body, and tail. The first white crossband begins at one corner of the mouth and continues around the back of the head to the other corner of the mouth.

== Reproduction ==
G. luii is oviparous.
