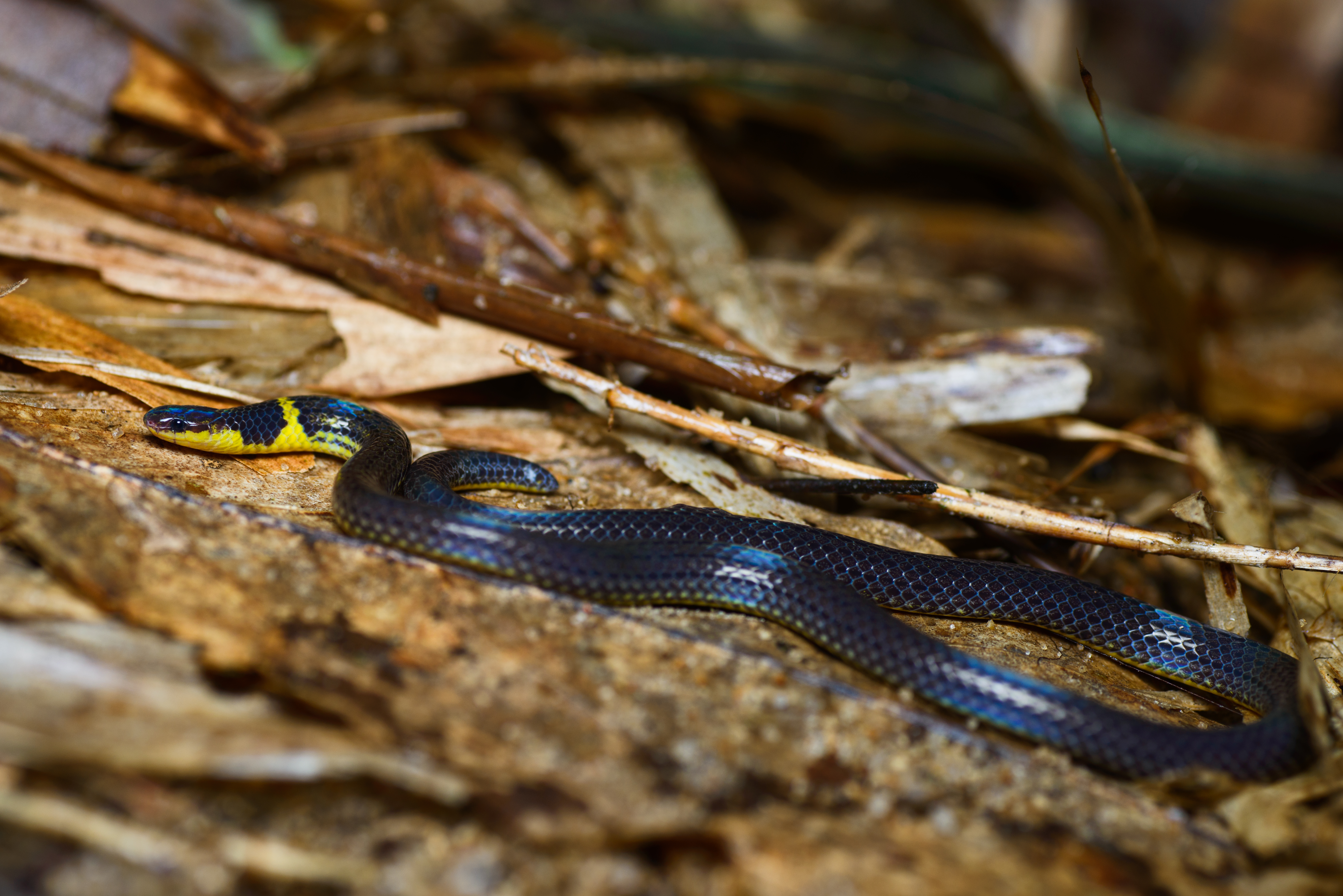

Conservation status
- Least Concern (IUCN 3.1)

Scientific classification
- Kingdom: Animalia
- Phylum: Chordata
- Class: Reptilia
- Order: Squamata
- Suborder: Serpentes
- Family: Colubridae
- Genus: Calamaria
- Species: C. pavimentata

Binomial name
- Calamaria pavimentata Duméril, Bibron & Duméril, 1854
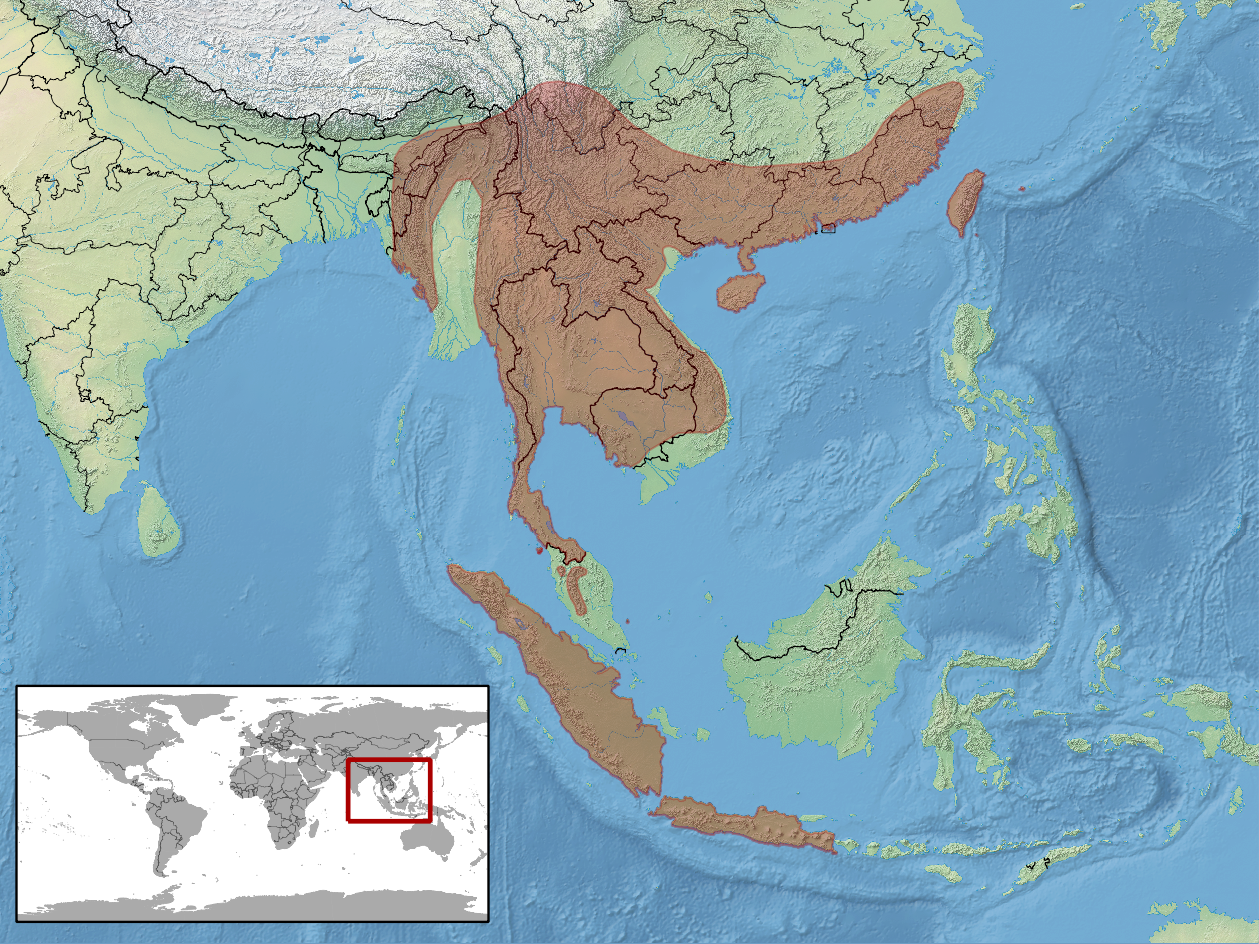

= Collared reed snake =

Species of snake

The collared reed snake (Calamaria pavimentata) is a species of colubrid snake found in Asia. In Japan, it is also called Miyara's collared snake.

== Description ==
The rostral is as deep as it is broad, and it is well visible from above. The frontal is longer than broad, shorter than the parietals, and 2.0 to 2.5 times as broad as the supraocular. C. pavimentata has one preocular scale and one postocular scale with four upper labials (the second and fourth are the largest, with the second and third entering the eye). The first pair of lower labials form a suture behind the mental scale. There are two pairs of chin shields, each pair in contact with the other. The scales are in 13 rows. There are 140–182 ventral scales, the anal scale is entire, and it has 13–27 subcaudal scales, and a pointed tail.

The collared reed snake is reddish-brown above, with five dark longitudinal lines or series of spots. The nape is dark brown and separated from the back by a yellow collar. A pair of yellow spots is seen at the base and another at the end of the tail. The lower parts show a uniform yellow with a dark line along the tail in the Burmese and Javan specimens, obscured with brown mottlings or brown with lighter borders in C. p. siamensis.

The total length of the body is 12.5 in (32 cm) with a 0.6-in (1.5-cm) tail.

== Distribution ==
This snake can be found in India (Assam), Myanmar, Thailand, Laos, Cambodia, Vietnam, west Malaysia (including Pulau Tioman), Indonesia, south and southwest China (including Hainan), Taiwan, and Japan (Ryukyu Islands).

Type locality: Java, Indonesia
