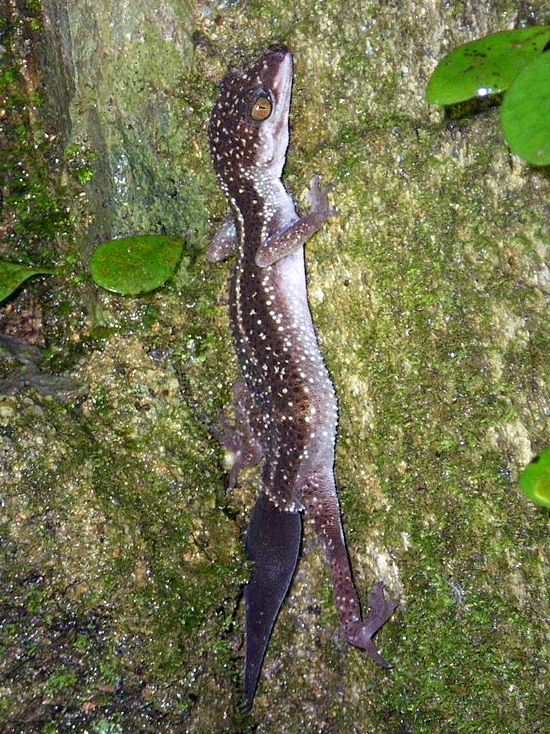
- in Ōgimi, Kunigami, Okinawa, Japan

Conservation status
- Vulnerable (IUCN 3.1)

Scientific classification
- Kingdom: Animalia
- Phylum: Chordata
- Class: Reptilia
- Order: Squamata
- Suborder: Gekkota
- Family: Eublepharidae
- Genus: Goniurosaurus
- Species: G. kuroiwae

Binomial name
- Goniurosaurus kuroiwae (Namiye, 1912)

Synonyms
- Gymnodactylus albofasciatus kuroiwae Namiye, 1912; Eublepharis kuroiwae — Wermuth, 1965; Amamisaurus kuroiwae — Börner, 1981; Goniurosaurus kuroiwae — Grismer, 1987

= Kuroiwa's ground gecko =

Species of lizard

Kuroiwa's ground gecko (Goniurosaurus kuroiwae) (from Japanese: クロイワトカゲモドキ/黒岩蜥蜴擬), also known commonly as Kuroiwa's eyelid gecko, Kuroiwa's leopard gecko, the Okinawan ground gecko, the Ryukyu eyelid gecko, and the Tokashiki gecko, is a species of lizard in the family Eublepharidae. The species is endemic to the Okinawa Islands in the Ryukyu Archipelago, Japan.

== Parasites ==
Kuroiwa's ground gecko is a common host for the parasite Cryptosporidium serpentis. This parasite is detrimental to the health of the gecko and causes severe gastrointestinal problems. Symptoms of a C. serpentis infection include: diarrhea, vomiting, and emaciation.

== Etymology ==
The specific name, kuroiwae, is in honor of T. Kuroiwa who was the collector of the holotype.

== Habitat ==
Kuroiwa's ground gecko occurs in subtropical forests in karst limestone areas at elevations below 450 m (1,480 ft).

== Behavior and diet ==
G. kuroiwae forages on small invertebrates in leaf litter at night.

== Reproduction ==
G. kuroiwae is oviparous. Clutch size is one or two eggs, and an adult female may lay as many as three clutches per year.
