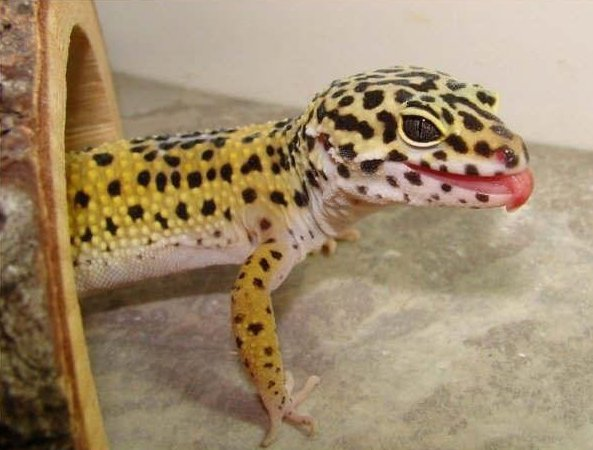
- Common leopard gecko (Eublepharis macularius)

Scientific classification
- Kingdom: Animalia
- Phylum: Chordata
- Class: Reptilia
- Order: Squamata
- Suborder: Gekkota
- Superfamily: Gekkonoidea
- Family: Eublepharidae; Boulenger, 1883

Genera
- See text

= Eublepharidae =

Family of lizards

The Eublepharidae are a family of geckos (Gekkota) consisting of 43 described species in 6 genera. They occur in Asia, Africa, North America, and Central America. Eublepharid geckos lack adhesive toepads and, unlike other geckos, have movable eyelids, thus commonly called eyelid geckos. Like other members of Gekkota, the Eublepharidae exhibits tail autotomy due to the fracture planes near their vent. A new tail will then grow in its place, usually lacking the original color and texture. The muscles in the old tail will continue to flex for up to 30 minutes after the drop to distract predators. Leopard geckos (Eublepharis macularius) and African fat-tailed geckos (Hemitheconyx caudicinctus) are popular pet lizards. Goniurosaurus species, including Goniurosaurus catbaensis are commonly found in the international pet market.

== Genera ==
The following genera are considered members of the Eublepharidae:

Genus	Image	Type species	Taxon author	Common name	Species
Aeluroscalabotes	A. felinus	A. felinus (Günther, 1864)	Boulenger, 1885	Cat gecko	1
Coleonyx	C. variegatus	C. elegans Gray, 1845	Gray, 1845	Banded geckos	9
Eublepharis	E. macularius	E. hardwickii Gray, 1827	Gray, 1827	Leopard geckos	7
Goniurosaurus	G. kuroiwae	G. hainanensis Barbour, 1908	Barbour, 1908	Ground and cave geckos	26
Hemitheconyx	H. caudicinctus	H. caudicinctus (Duméril, 1851)	Stejneger, 1893	Fat-tailed geckos	2
Holodactylus	H. africanus	H. africanus Boettger, 1893	Boettger, 1893	Clawed geckos	2
