= Diploderma crypticum =

- Holotype of Diploderma crypticum as seen from various angles

Scientific classification
- Kingdom: Animalia
- Phylum: Chordata
- Class: Reptilia
- Order: Squamata
- Suborder: Iguania
- Family: Agamidae
- Genus: Diploderma
- Species: D. crypticum

Binomial name
- Diploderma crypticum Liu, Wang, Hou, Zeng, Zhang & Rao, 2026

Species of lizard

Diploderma crypticum is a species of lizard in the genus Diploderma found in eastern Tibet, China. It was first described by Shuo Liu, JiShan Wang, Mian Hou, Wei Zeng, Hongyuan Zhang, and Dingqi Rao in 2026.

== Description ==
The snout-vent length is between 54.8 and 69.6 millimeters in males, and between 57.8 and 62.9 millimeters in females. The tympanum is concealed, and the species has a gular fold. The gular scales on the underside of the throat are yellow-green in males, and may be either yellow-green or light yellow in females. Males additionally have two light yellow stripes along their backs. Diploderma crypticum is most closely related to Diploderma laeviventre and Diploderma yangi; however, the color of the gular scales distinguishes it from both of them.

== Etymology ==
The species name crypticum derives from the Greek term "kryptos" (hidden), due to the species' "cryptic status" and similarity to D. laeviventre and D. yangi.

== Distribution ==
The species is native to a valley of one of the tributaries of the Nujiang River. Specimens were collected near Wabu Village in Cawarong Township, Tibet, China.
