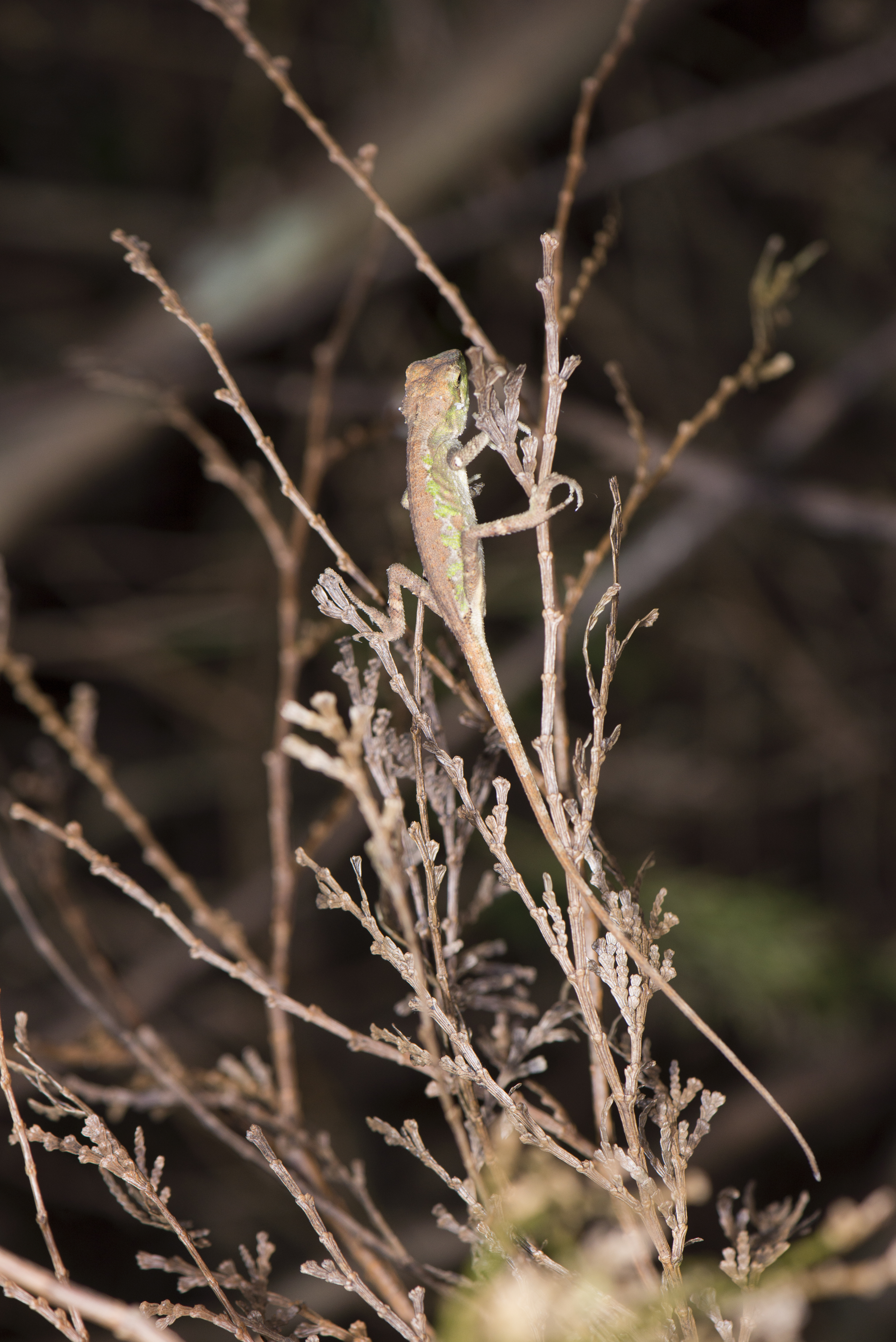

Conservation status
- Vulnerable (IUCN 3.1)

Scientific classification
- Kingdom: Animalia
- Phylum: Chordata
- Class: Reptilia
- Order: Squamata
- Suborder: Iguania
- Family: Agamidae
- Genus: Diploderma
- Species: D. makii

Binomial name
- Diploderma makii (Ota, 1989)

Synonyms
- Japalura makii Ota, 1989

= Diploderma makii =

Species of reptile

Diploderma makii, also known commonly as Ota's japalure, is a species of lizard in the subfamily Draconinae of the family Agamidae. The species is endemic to Taiwan.

== Etymology ==
The specific name, makii, is in honor of Japanese herpetologist Moichirō Maki (1886–1959).

== Habitat ==
The preferred natural habitat of Diploderma makii is forest, at altitudes of 900–1,800 m (3,000–5,900 ft).

== Reproduction ==
Diploderma makii is oviparous. Clutch size is 4–8 eggs.

== Taxonomy ==
Diploderma makii is closely related to Diploderma swinhonis.
