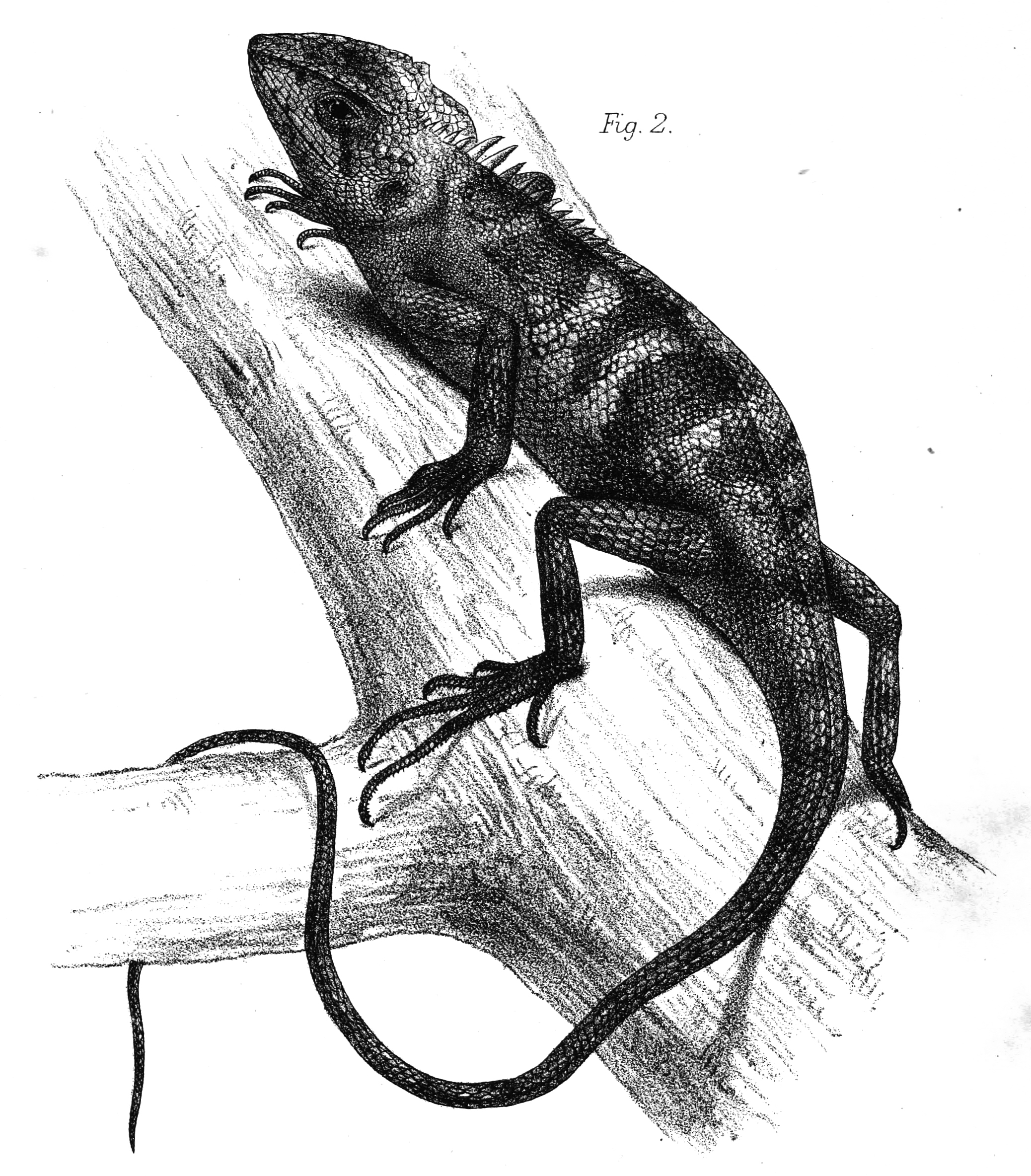

Conservation status
- Least Concern (IUCN 3.1)

Scientific classification
- Domain: Eukaryota
- Kingdom: Animalia
- Phylum: Chordata
- Class: Reptilia
- Order: Squamata
- Suborder: Iguania
- Family: Agamidae
- Genus: Diploderma
- Species: D. yunnanense

Binomial name
- Diploderma yunnanense Anderson, 1878

Synonyms
- Japalura yunnanensis

= Yunnan japalure =

Species of lizard

The Yunnan japalure (Diploderma yunnanense) is an agamid lizard found in Yunnan in southern China and Kachin in northern Myanmar, and possibly in Thailand. The subspecies Diploderma yunnanense popei is considered synonymous with Diploderma swinhonis.
