= Diploderma gulaense =

- Male Diploderma gulaense as seen from various angles

Scientific classification
- Kingdom: Animalia
- Phylum: Chordata
- Class: Reptilia
- Order: Squamata
- Suborder: Iguania
- Family: Agamidae
- Genus: Diploderma
- Species: D. gulaense

Binomial name
- Diploderma gulaense Cai, Yao, Wu & Guo, 2026

Species of lizard

Diploderma gulaense, the Gula mountain lizard, is a species of lizard in the genus Diploderma found in Zayü County, Tibet, China. It was first described by Bo Cai, Zhongyi Yao, Boyang Wu, and Keji Guo in 2026.

== Etymology ==
The species name gulaense refers to Gula Township in Zayü County, where the species was discovered. The name "Gula mountain lizard" (Chinese: 古拉攀蜥; pinyin: gǔlā pānxī) was suggested by Cai, Yao, Wu and Guo in their paper describing the new species.

== Description ==
The snout-vent length is between 53.1 and 63.4 millimeters in males and between 54.8 and 70.2 millimeters in females. The tympanum is concealed, and the species has a gular fold. The gular scales on the underside of the throat are cyan-colored, and males additionally have two cyan-colored stripes along their backs. The tongue is a pale flesh color. These characteristics distinguish it from other members of its genus, including the similar Diploderma laeviventre.

== Distribution ==
Diploderma gulaense is found in Ranbuqu Valley (part of the Hengduan Mountains) in Zayu County, at elevations between 2,332 and 3,300 meters.
