= Diploderma tachengense =

Scientific classification
- Kingdom: Animalia
- Phylum: Chordata
- Class: Reptilia
- Order: Squamata
- Suborder: Iguania
- Family: Agamidae
- Genus: Diploderma
- Species: D. tachengense

Binomial name
- Diploderma tachengense Liu, Hou, Ananjeva, & Rao, 2023

Species of lizard

Diploderma tachengense is endemic to China.
