= Diploderma danbaense =

Scientific classification
- Kingdom: Animalia
- Phylum: Chordata
- Class: Reptilia
- Order: Squamata
- Suborder: Iguania
- Family: Agamidae
- Genus: Diploderma
- Species: D. danbaense

Binomial name
- Diploderma danbaense Liu, Hou, Ananjeva, & Rao, 2023

Species of lizard

Diploderma danbaense is endemic to China.
