= Cyrtodactylus gulinqingensis =

Scientific classification
- Kingdom: Animalia
- Phylum: Chordata
- Class: Reptilia
- Order: Squamata
- Suborder: Gekkota
- Family: Gekkonidae
- Genus: Cyrtodactylus
- Species: C. gulinqingensis

Binomial name
- Cyrtodactylus gulinqingensis Liu, Li, Hou, Orlov, & Ananjeva, 2021

Species of lizard

Cyrtodactylus gulinqingensis, the Gulinqing bent-toed gecko, is a species of gecko endemic to China.
