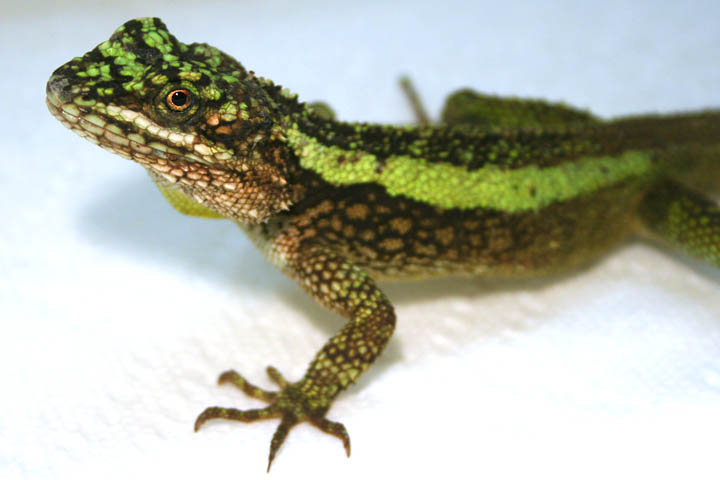

Conservation status
- Least Concern (IUCN 3.1)

Scientific classification
- Kingdom: Animalia
- Phylum: Chordata
- Order: Squamata
- Suborder: Iguania
- Family: Agamidae
- Genus: Diploderma
- Species: D. splendidum

Binomial name
- Diploderma splendidum Barbour & Dunn, 1919

Synonyms
- Japalura splendida

= Diploderma splendidum =

Species of lizard

Diploderma splendidum, the green striped tree dragon, also called splendid japalure, is an agamid lizard found in the Yangtze River Basin of southwestern China. They are sold as pets internationally.

== Description ==
The top of the head is covered with medium-sized, subequal, rugose, juxtaposed scales. On the snout a median series of three or four slightly enlarged subconical scales forms a faintly indicated ridge, which is flanked on each side by a considerably enlarged anterior canthal scale. No other head scales are conspicuously enlarged, except one or two on each side of the post-occipital areas. The rostral is twice as wide as high, and wider but lower than the mental. The canthus rostralis is sharply defined and continuous with the superciliaries. The nostril resides in a large suboval shield, separated from the rostral by a single small scale, is in contact with the first labial, and is separated from the second labial by a single small shield. There are eight upper labials - with the sixth below the center of the eye - and ten lower labials. The orbit is separated from the upper labials by three rows of shields, the middle row being much enlarged. A short series of about three enlarged shields are found above the tympanic region, and above these are a few, elongated, almost spine-like scales. The nuchal crest is very feeble, and is composed of about eight or nine slightly enlarged, denticulate scales; it is continuous with the even more feebly developed dorsal crest. There is a faintly indicated fold anterior to the insertion of the forelimb; a large area is covered with tiny almost granular scales above the insertion of the forelimb. The back and sides are covered with imbricate, strongly keeled scales, which vary somewhat in size. Somewhat enlarged scales are abundantly scattered over the whole back and sides, and generally tend to form longitudinal series (more so than in Diploderma flaviceps, also with the largest scales far less conspicuously enlarged). The scales of the throat and belly are small, about equal in size, and are strongly keeled. When extended forward, the hind limb reaches the anterior border of the orbit or slightly beyond. The scales of both the forelimbs and hind limbs are strongly keeled and are unequal in size.

The type specimen - an adult male - was described as having a dark brown head which was conspicuously marked with yellow spots and streaks above and on the sides. In addition, a yellow band extended from behind the nostril, beneath the eye and above the labials, to below the tympanic area. The rostral and three anterior labials were yellow, while the others were dark. The back was a uniform dark brown with a broad and conspicuous light stripe on each side, and a broad dark zone below the light stripes. The belly and tail were dusky, the latter having irregular darker bands. The throat was conspicuously longitudinally streaked with brown on a yellow background.

== Habitat ==
D. splendidum is native to the temperate yet humid lowland jungles surrounding the Yangtze River in southwestern China.

== Diet ==
While primarily insectivorous, recent research on the gut flora of D. splendidum suggest that - due to the presence of bacteria responsible for anaerobic fermentation and the digestion of fiber - this species may occasionally be herbivorous.

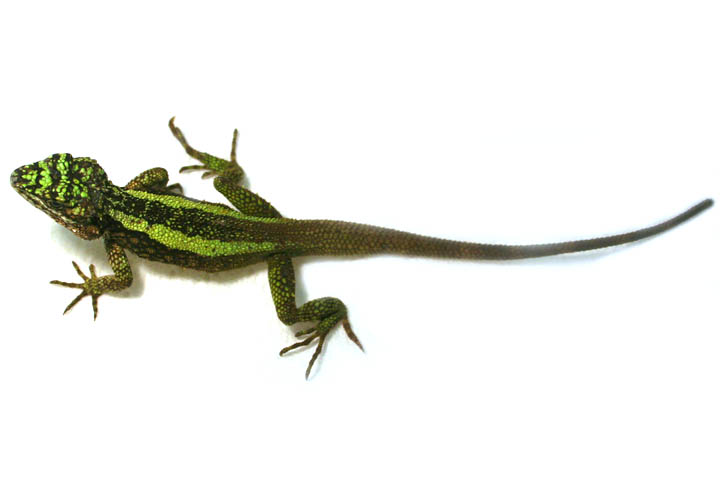
Diploderma splendidum top view, male

== Parasites and pathogens ==
Through samples of bacterial flora of the gut and oral cavity, a total of 26 species of potential human pathogens were identified in wild specimens of D. splendidum, which were namely: Clostridium perfringens, Clostridium baratii, Clostridium botulinum, Fusobacterium mortiferum, Streptococcus pneumoniae, Citrobacter freundii, Pseudomonas aeruginosa, Staphylococcus aureus, Mycobacterium tuberculosis, Listeria monocytogenes, Chlamydia trachomatis, and Mycoplasma pneumoniae that were found in both the gut and oral cavity, while Fusobacterium russii, Prevotella denticola, Prevotella melaninogenica, Prevotella loescheii, Enterococcus durans, Streptococcus minor, Streptobacillus moniliformis, Lactococcus garvieae, Comamonas testosterone, Enterococcus cecorum, Desulfovibrio desulfuricans, Bartonella rattaustraliani, Yersinia pseudotuberculosis, and Yersinia enterocolitica were found only in the gut. Due to these findings, Tian et al. concluded that keeping D. splendidum in captivity could lead to a high risk of the potential spread of infectious diseases through bite wounds or water or food contaminated with feces.

In addition, Diploderma splendidum also harbours specific parasites such as the nematode Rhabdias megalocephalum.
