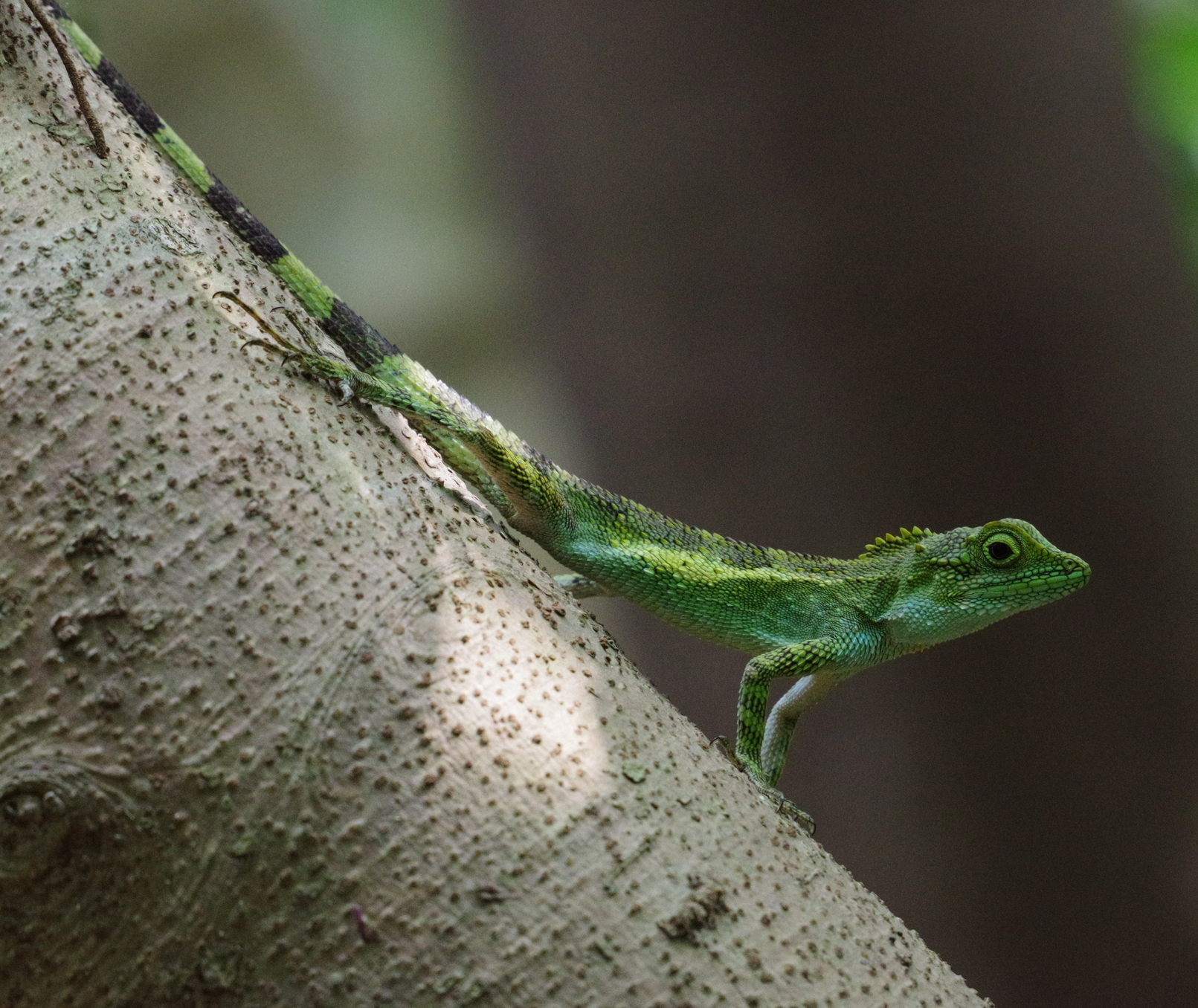

Conservation status
- Near Threatened (IUCN 3.1)

Scientific classification
- Kingdom: Animalia
- Phylum: Chordata
- Class: Reptilia
- Order: Squamata
- Suborder: Iguania
- Family: Agamidae
- Genus: Diploderma
- Species: D. polygonatum

Binomial name
- Diploderma polygonatum (Hallowell, 1861)

Synonyms
- Japalura polygonata Hallowell, 1861

= Diploderma polygonatum =

Species of lizard

Diploderma polygonatum, also known as Ryukyu japalure and Okinawa tree lizard, is a species of lizard found in the Ryukyu Islands and Taiwan. It is diurnal and arboreal. An adult male Diploderma polygonatum measures "61 mm. from snout to vent, and 152 mm. from vent to tip of tail; total length 213 mm." The splenial of this lizard is short, as is that of Trapelus agilis. The lizard is also closely related to Diploderma swinhonis.

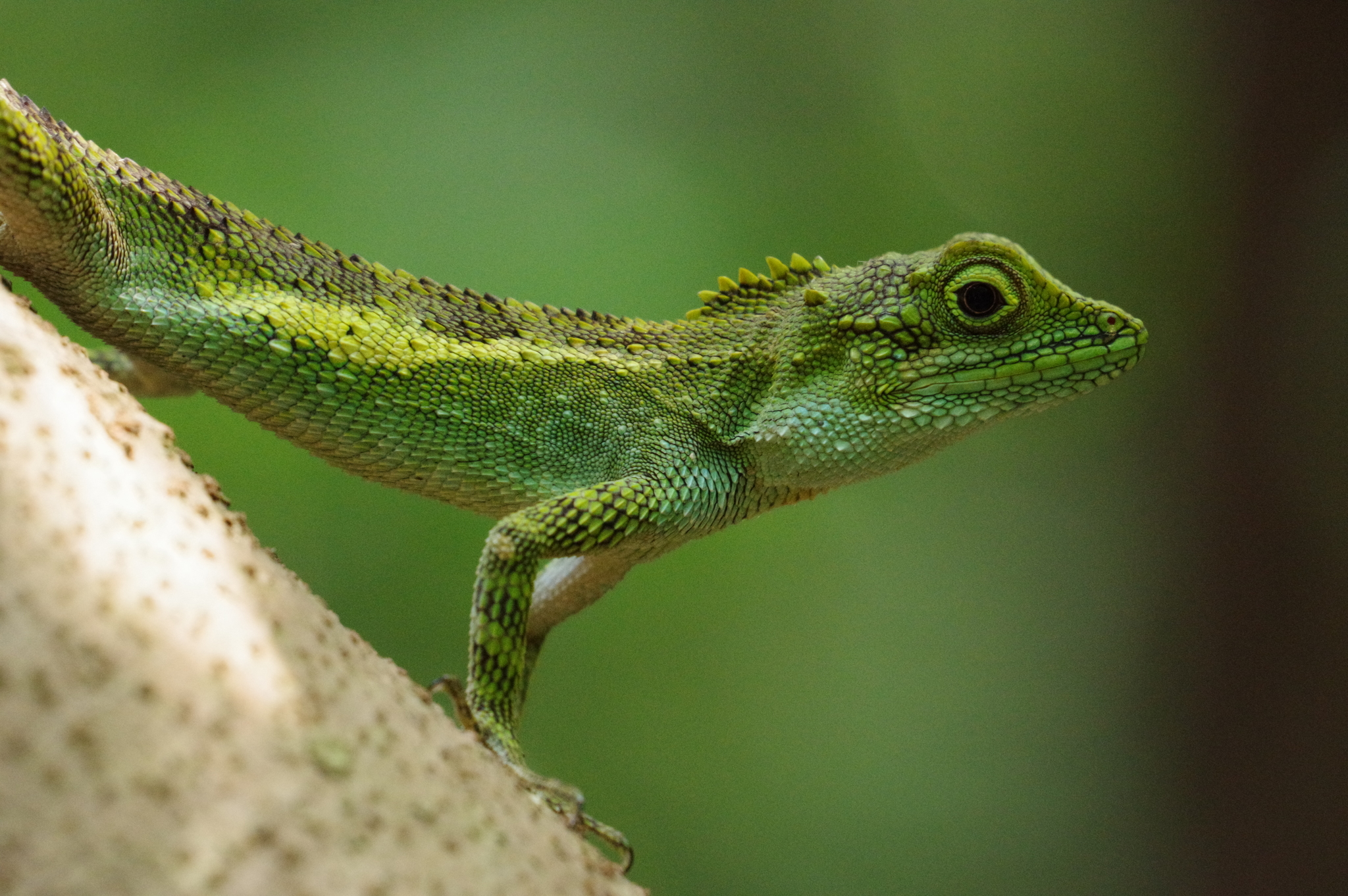
Closeup, in Japan

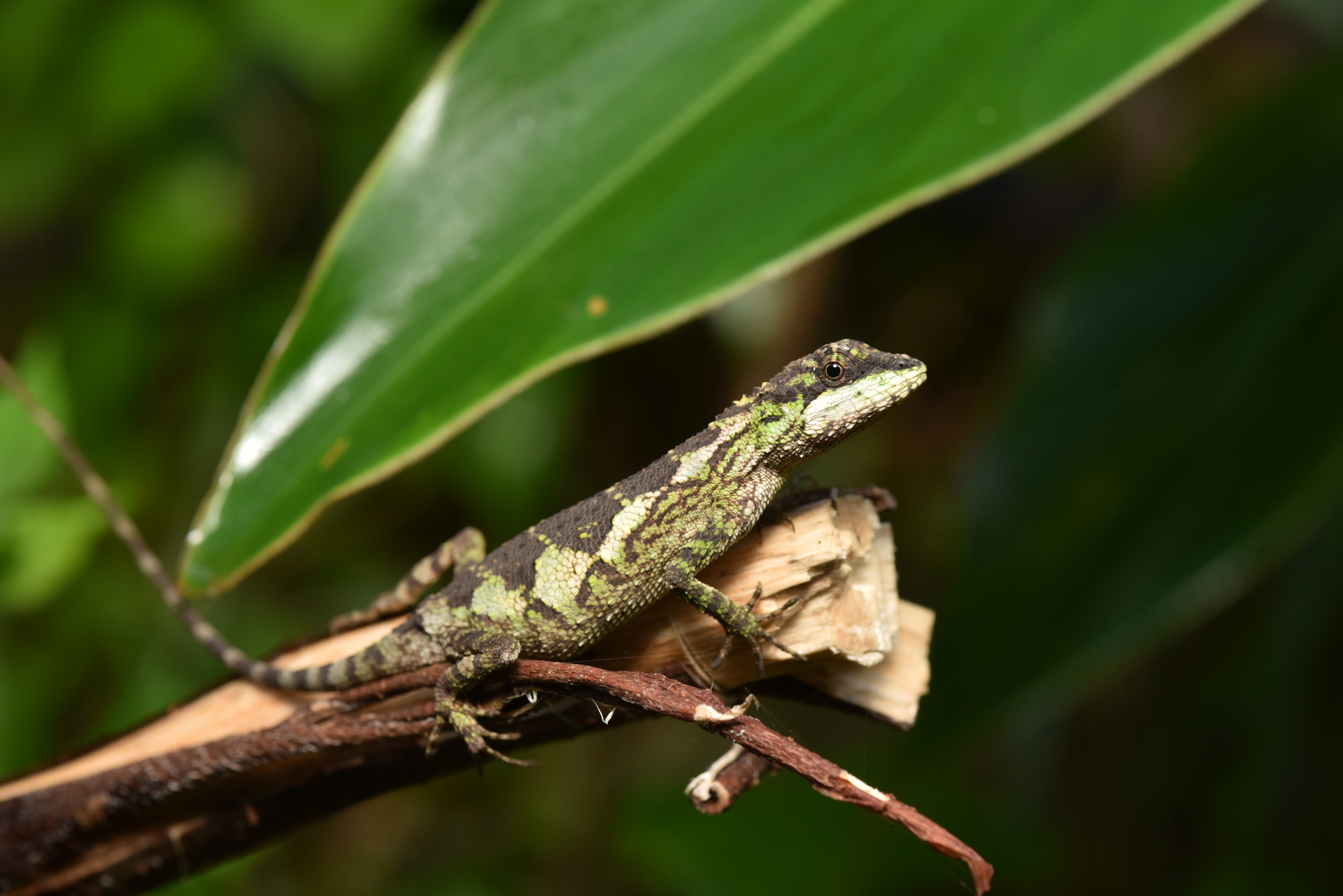
In Taiwan
