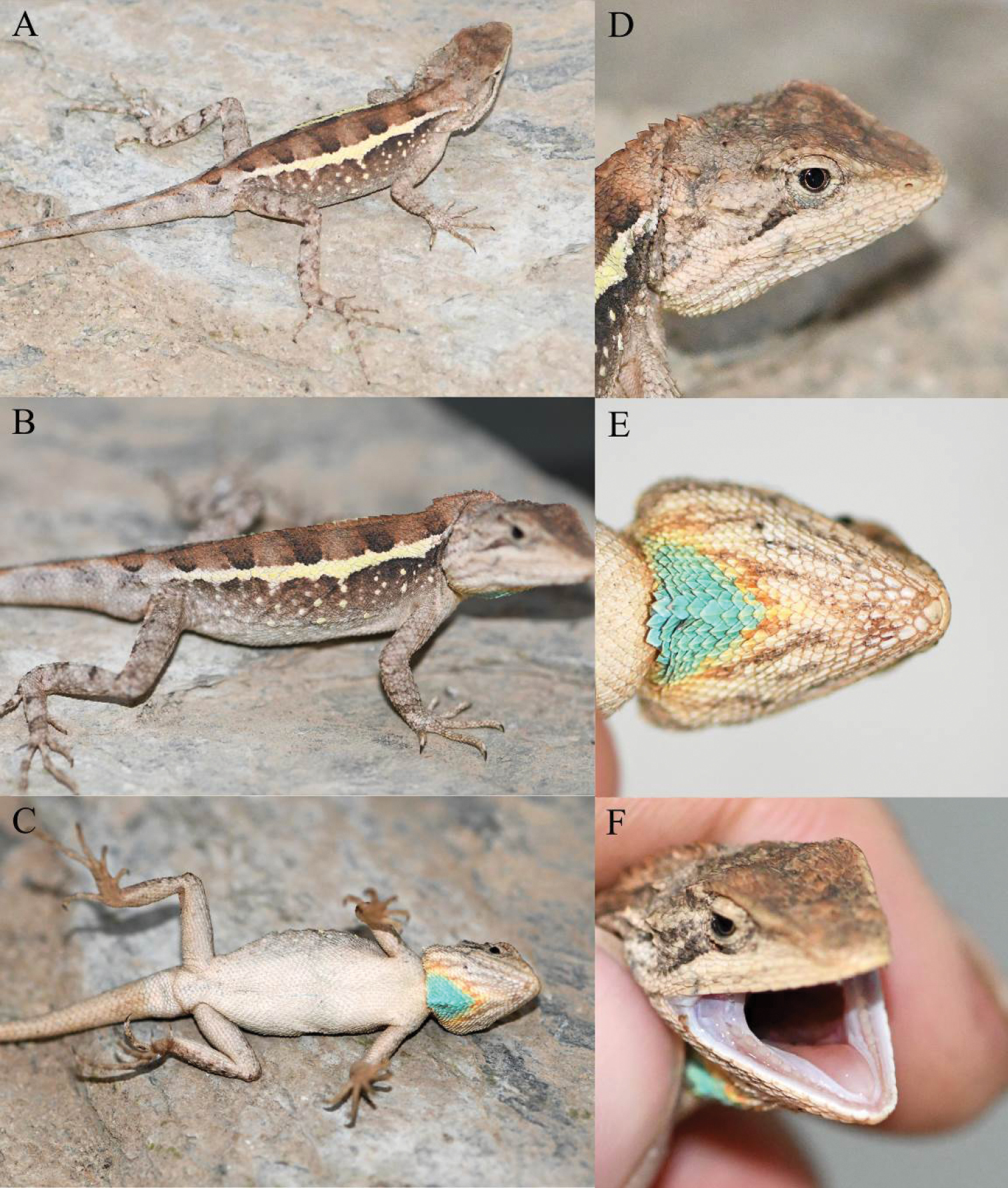

Scientific classification
- Kingdom: Animalia
- Phylum: Chordata
- Class: Reptilia
- Order: Squamata
- Suborder: Iguania
- Family: Agamidae
- Genus: Diploderma
- Species: D. yongshengense

Binomial name
- Diploderma yongshengense Liu, Hou, Rao, & Ananjeva, 2022

= Diploderma yongshengense =

Species of reptile

Diploderma yongshengense is a species of lizard in the family Agamidae. The species is endemic to China.
