= Diploderma luei =

Conservation status
- Endangered (IUCN 3.1)

Scientific classification
- Kingdom: Animalia
- Phylum: Chordata
- Class: Reptilia
- Order: Squamata
- Suborder: Iguania
- Family: Agamidae
- Genus: Diploderma
- Species: D. luei

Binomial name
- Diploderma luei (Ota, Chen & Shang, 1998)

Synonyms
- Japalura luei Ota, Chen & Shang, 1988; Diploderma luei — Wang et al., 2018

Species of lizard

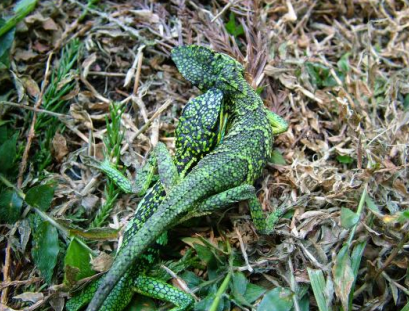

Diploderma luei is a species of lizard in the subfamily Draconinae of the family Agamidae. The species is endemic to Taiwan.

== Geographic range ==
In Taiwan Diploderma luei has only been found in the mountains of Yilan County and Hualien County.

== Habitat ==
The preferred natural habitat of Diploderma huei is forest, at elevations of 500–2,000 m (1,600–6,600 ft).

== Description ==
The snout-to-vent length (SVL) of Diploderma luei may reach 10 cm (3.9 in); the total length (including the long tail) may reach 27 cm (11 in).

== Behavior ==
Diploderma huei is arboreal.

== Reproduction ==
Diploderma luei is oviparous.

== Etymology ==
The specific name, luei, comes from the name of Taiwanese herpetologist Kuang-Yang Lue, to honor his contributions to the herpetology of Taiwan.

== Conservation status ==
Diploderma luei is listed as a rare and valuable species in the Taiwan Wildlife Conservation Act similar to Diploderma swinhonis.
