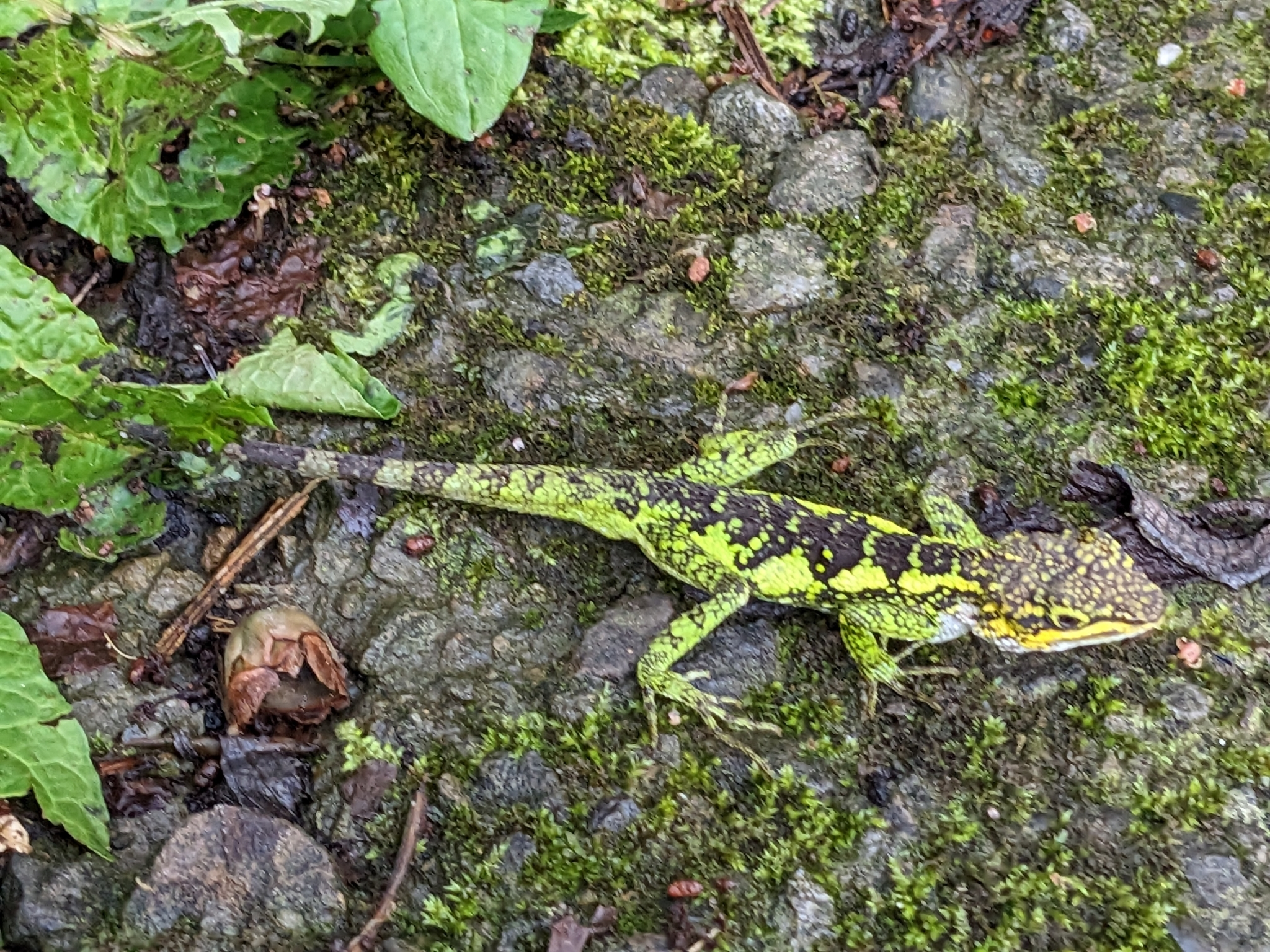

Scientific classification
- Domain: Eukaryota
- Kingdom: Animalia
- Phylum: Chordata
- Class: Reptilia
- Order: Squamata
- Suborder: Iguania
- Family: Agamidae
- Genus: Diploderma
- Species: D. brevipes

Binomial name
- Diploderma brevipes Gressitt, 1936

Synonyms
- Japalura brevipes

= Short-legged japalure =

Species of lizard

The short-legged japalure (Diploderma brevipes) is a species of lizard that is endemic to Taiwan. It is found in mountains at elevations of 1100 to 2200 m and inhabits forest edges. It has a 10-cm long body, and the total length reaches 25 cm. It is sexually dimorphic. The male has a black back, with yellow-green spots and stripes. The female is mainly green. A diurnal and oviparous species, it eats insects and other small invertebrates. The species was described by J. Linsley Gressitt in 1936. It is listed as other conservation-deserving wildlife in the Taiwan Wildlife Conservation Act. This species is closely related to Diploderma swinhonis.
