= Diploderma iadinum =

Conservation status
- Near Threatened (IUCN 3.1)

Scientific classification
- Kingdom: Animalia
- Phylum: Chordata
- Class: Reptilia
- Order: Squamata
- Suborder: Iguania
- Family: Agamidae
- Genus: Diploderma
- Species: D. iadinum

Binomial name
- Diploderma iadinum (Wang, Jiang, Siler, & Che, 2016)

Synonyms
- Japalura iadina Wang et al., 2016

Species of reptile

Diploderma iadinum, the emerald mountain dragon, is a species of lizard. It is endemic to Yunnan, China.
