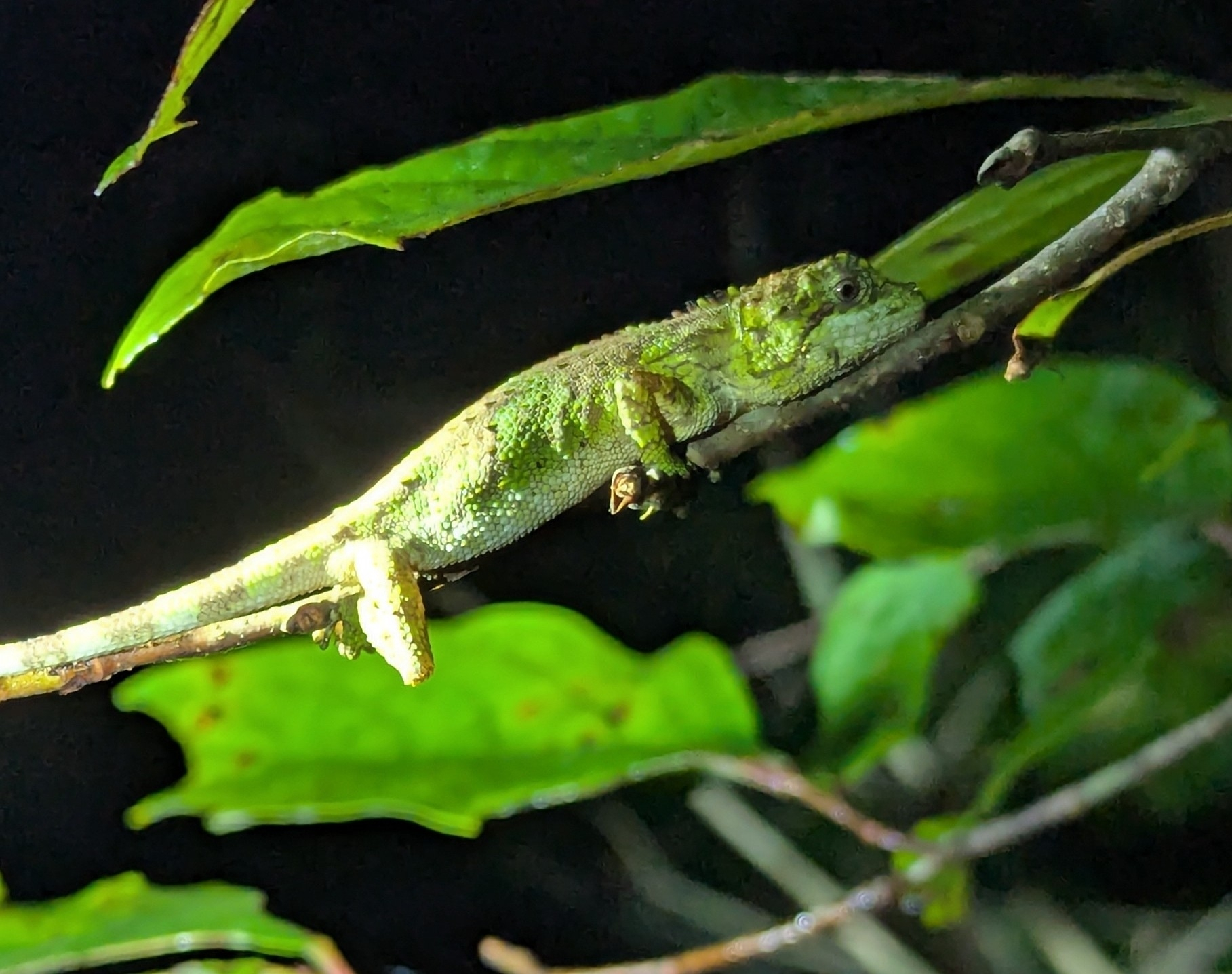

Conservation status
- Least Concern (IUCN 3.1)

Scientific classification
- Kingdom: Animalia
- Phylum: Chordata
- Class: Reptilia
- Order: Squamata
- Suborder: Iguania
- Family: Agamidae
- Genus: Diploderma
- Species: D. fasciatum

Binomial name
- Diploderma fasciatum Mertens, 1926

Synonyms
- Japalura szechwanensis Hu & Zhao, 1966; Japalura fasciata Mertens, 1926

= Banded japalure =

Species of lizard

The banded japalure (Diploderma fasciatum) is a species of lizard. It is found in northern Vietnam and Sichuan, Chongqing, Guizhou and Guangxi of China, at elevations of 800–2,000 m (2,600–6,600 ft). Its habitat is montane forests. Its snout-vent length is 7.5 cm (3.0 in). The IUCN Red List of Threatened Species has assessed the species to be of least concern.
