= Diploderma swild =

Scientific classification
- Kingdom: Animalia
- Phylum: Chordata
- Class: Reptilia
- Order: Squamata
- Suborder: Iguania
- Family: Agamidae
- Genus: Diploderma
- Species: D. swild

Binomial name
- Diploderma swild Wang, Wu, Jiang, Chen, Miao, Siler, & Che, 2019

Species of lizard

Diploderma swild, the Swild mountain dragon, is a species of lizard, which was first identified in China in 2019.
