= Diploderma flavilabre =

Scientific classification
- Kingdom: Animalia
- Phylum: Chordata
- Class: Reptilia
- Order: Squamata
- Suborder: Iguania
- Family: Agamidae
- Genus: Diploderma
- Species: D. flavilabre

Binomial name
- Diploderma flavilabre Wang, Che, & Siler, 2020

Species of lizard

Diploderma flavilabre, the yellow-lipped mountain dragon, is endemic to China.

== Description ==
The snout-vent length of females is 64.2 millimetres (2.53 in)-72.9 millimetres (2.87 in), while males are smaller, being 50.8 millimetres (2.00 in)-55.2 millimetres (2.17 in) long.
