= Diploderma dymondi =

Conservation status
- Least Concern (IUCN 3.1)

Scientific classification
- Kingdom: Animalia
- Phylum: Chordata
- Class: Reptilia
- Order: Squamata
- Suborder: Iguania
- Family: Agamidae
- Genus: Diploderma
- Species: D. dymondi

Binomial name
- Diploderma dymondi (Boulenger, 1906)

Synonyms
- Acanthosaura dymondi Boulenger, 1906; Japalura dymondi — M.A. Smith, 1935; Diploderma dymondi — Wang et al., 2018

Species of lizard

Diploderma dymondi, also known commonly as Dymond's japalure, is a species of lizard in the family Agamidae. The species is endemic to China.

== Etymology ==
The specific name, dymondi, is in honor of the Rev. Francis John "Frank" Dymond (1866–1932), who was a Methodist missionary in China.

== Geographic range ==
D. dymondi is found in southern Sichuan Province and northern Yunnan Province, China.

== Habitat ==
The preferred natural habitat of D. dymondi is forest, at altitudes of 2,000–2,500 m (6,600–8,200 ft).

== Description ==
D. dymondi may attain a snout-to-vent length (SVL) of almost 8 cm (3.1 in), with a tail length of 18.5 cm (7.3 in).

== Reproduction ==
D. dymondi is oviparous.
