= Diploderma hamptoni =

Conservation status
- Data Deficient (IUCN 3.1)

Scientific classification
- Kingdom: Animalia
- Phylum: Chordata
- Class: Reptilia
- Order: Squamata
- Suborder: Iguania
- Family: Agamidae
- Genus: Diploderma
- Species: D. hamptoni

Binomial name
- Diploderma hamptoni (M.A. Smith, 1935)

Synonyms
- Japalura hamptoni M.A. Smith, 1935

Species of lizard

Diploderma hamptoni, also known commonly as Hampton's japalure, is a species of lizard in the family Agamidae. The species is endemic to Myanmar.

== Etymology ==
The specific name, hamptoni, is in honor of Herbert Hampton, collector of the holotype.

== Geographic range ==
D. hamptoni is found in northern Myanmar.

== Habitat ==
The preferred natural habitat of D. hamptoni is forest.

== Behavior ==
D. hamptoni is diurnal.

== Reproduction ==
D. hamptoni is oviparous.
