= Diploderma grahami =

Conservation status
- Data Deficient (IUCN 3.1)

Scientific classification
- Kingdom: Animalia
- Phylum: Chordata
- Class: Reptilia
- Order: Squamata
- Suborder: Iguania
- Family: Agamidae
- Genus: Diploderma
- Species: D. grahami

Binomial name
- Diploderma grahami (Stejneger, 1924)

Synonyms
- Phoxophrys grahami Stejneger, 1924; Japalura grahami — Inger, 1960; Diploderma grahami — K. Wang et al., 2018

Species of lizard

Diploderma grahami, also known commonly as Graham's japalure, is species of lizard in the family Agamidae. The species is endemic to China.

== Etymology ==
The specific name, grahami, is in honor of American Christian missionary, the Rev. Dr. David Crockett Graham, who collected natural history specimens in China.

== Geographic range ==
D. grahami is found in the Chinese province of Sichuan.

== Habitat ==
The preferred natural habitat of D. grahami is forest.

== Reproduction ==
D. grahami is oviparous.
