= Diploderma kangdingense =

Scientific classification
- Kingdom: Animalia
- Phylum: Chordata
- Class: Reptilia
- Order: Squamata
- Suborder: Iguania
- Family: Agamidae
- Genus: Diploderma
- Species: D. kangdingense

Binomial name
- Diploderma kangdingense Cai, Zhang, Li, Du, Xie, Hou, Zhou, & Jiang, 2022

Species of reptile

Diploderma kangdingense, the Kangding mountain lizard, is a species of lizard in the family Agamidae. The species is endemic to China.
