= Diploderma formosgulae =

Scientific classification
- Kingdom: Animalia
- Phylum: Chordata
- Class: Reptilia
- Order: Squamata
- Suborder: Iguania
- Family: Agamidae
- Genus: Diploderma
- Species: D. formosgulae

Binomial name
- Diploderma formosgulae Wang, Gao, Wu, Dong, Shi, Qi, Siler, & Che, 2021

Species of lizard

Diploderma formosgulae, the vibrant-gulared mountain dragon, is endemic to China.
