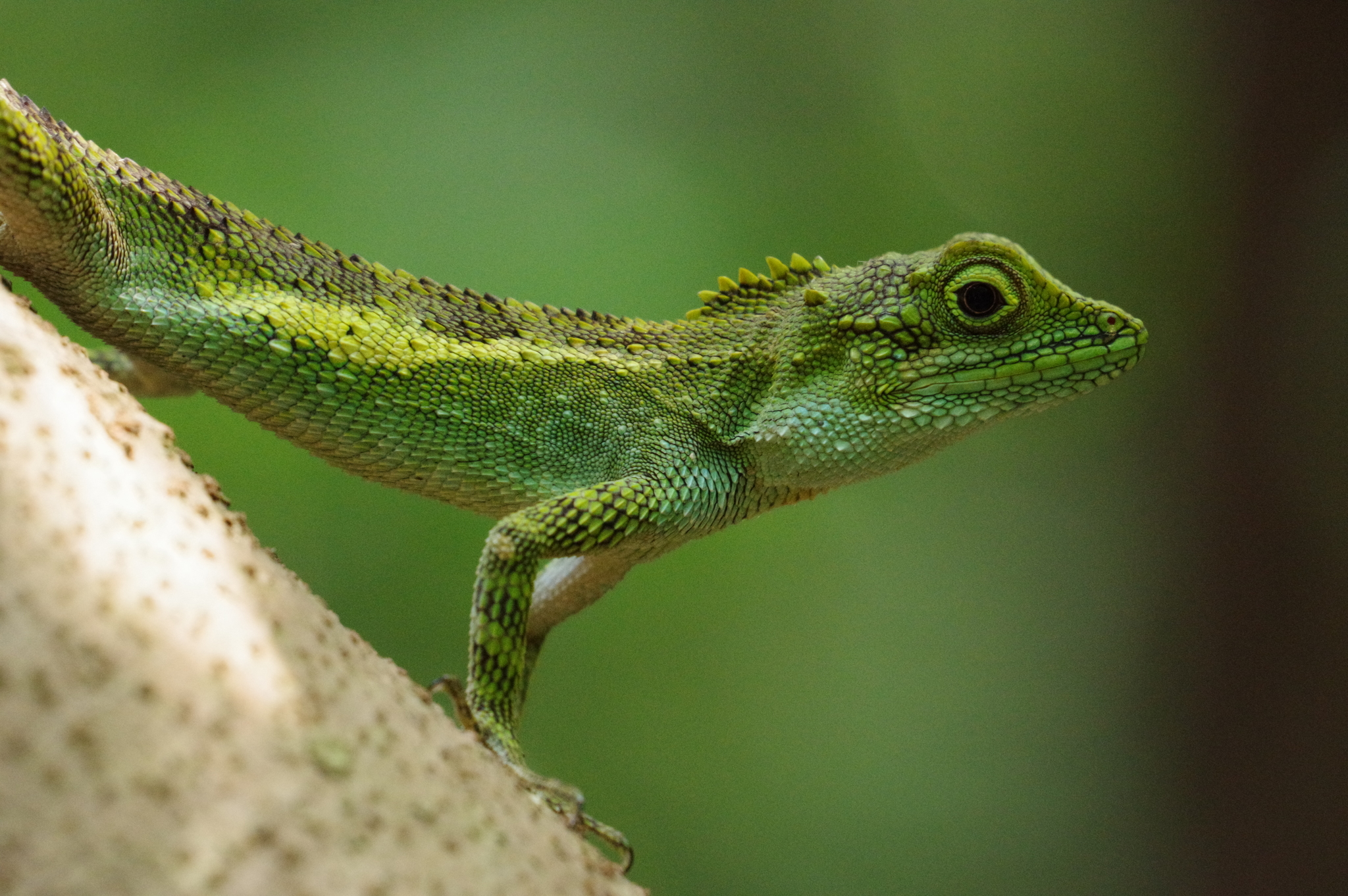
- Diploderma polygonatum

Scientific classification
- Kingdom: Animalia
- Phylum: Chordata
- Class: Reptilia
- Order: Squamata
- Suborder: Iguania
- Family: Agamidae
- Subfamily: Draconinae
- Genus: Diploderma; Hallowell, 1861

Species
- 46, see text.

= Diploderma =

Genus of lizards

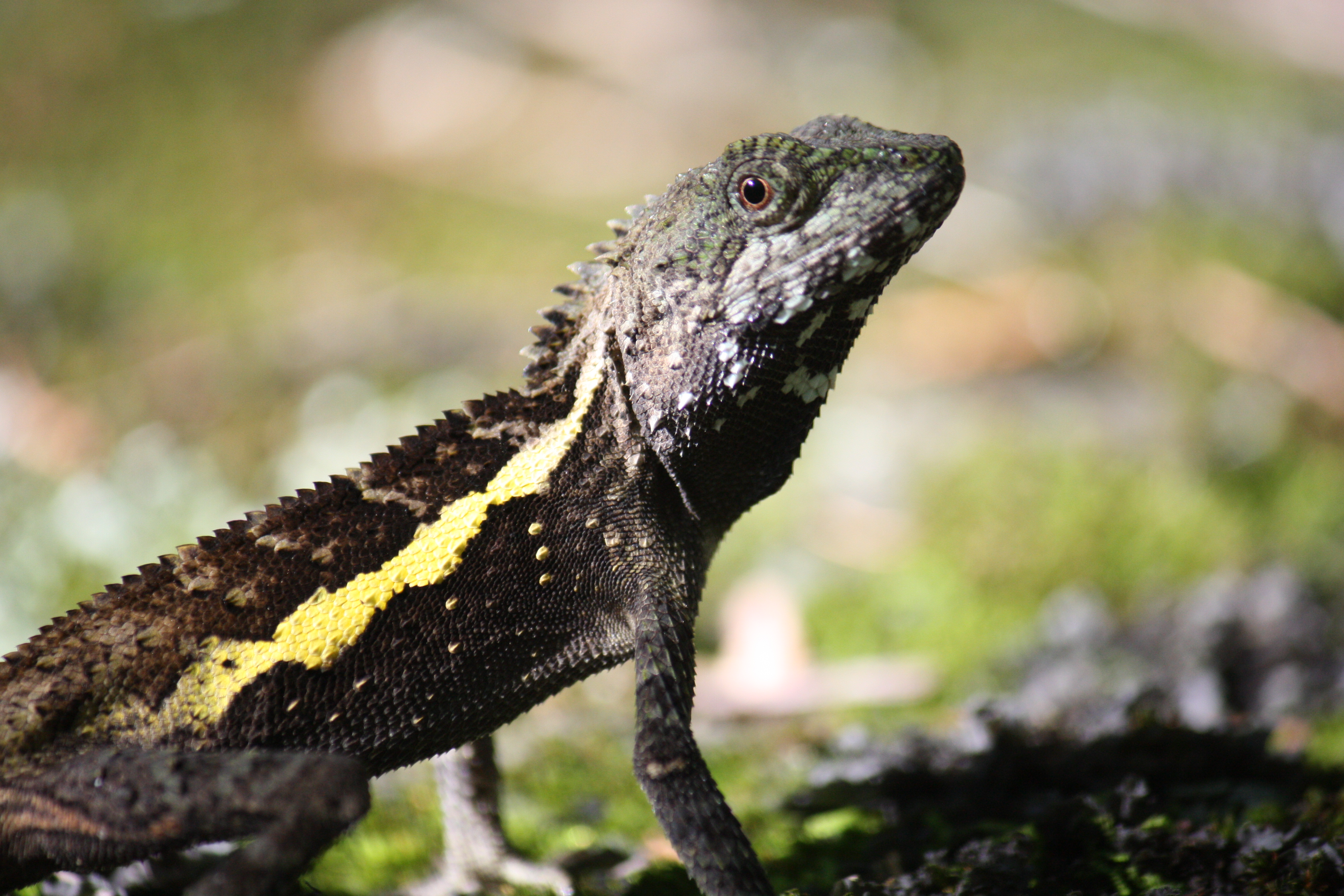
Diploderma swinhonis

Diploderma is a genus of lizards in the family Agamidae. Species of Diploderma are native to Myanmar, China, Vietnam, Taiwan, and Japan. Most of the species are found in China, including many endemics.

== Species ==
The following 49 species are recognized as being valid:

- Diploderma angustelinea K. Wang, Ren, J. Wu, Che & Siler, 2020 – narrow-striped mountain dragon
- Diploderma aorun K. Wang, Jiang, Zheng, Xie, Che & Siler, 2020 – Aorun mountain dragon
- Diploderma batangense (C. Li, Deng, Y. Wu & Y. Wang, 2001)
- Diploderma bifluviale F. Liu, Wu, Zhang, Yang, S. Liu, Chen, Chang, Xie & Cai. 2025- Hengduan mountain dragon
- Diploderma bowoense K. Wang, Gao, J. Wu, Siler & Che, 2021 – Bowo mountain dragon
- Diploderma brevicauda (Manthey, Denzer, Hou & X. Wang, 2012)
- Diploderma brevipes (Gressitt, 1936) – short-legged japalure
- Diploderma chapaense (Bourret, 1937)
- Diploderma crypticum Liu, Wang, Hou, Zeng, Zhang & Rao, 2026
- Diploderma daduense Cai, Liu & Chang, 2024
- Diploderma danbaense Liu, Hou, Ananjeva, & Rao, 2023
- Diploderma daochengense Cai, Zhang, Li, Du, Xie, Hou, Zhou, & Jiang, 2022 – Daocheng mountain lizard
- Diploderma donglangense Liu, Hou, Ananjeva, & Rao, 2023
- Diploderma drukdaypo K. Wang, Ren, Jiang, Zou, J. Wu, Che & Siler, 2019 – dwarf mountain dragon
- Diploderma dymondi (Boulenger, 1906) – Dymond's japalure
- Diploderma fasciatum (Mertens, 1926) – banded japalure
- Diploderma flaviceps (Barbour & Dunn, 1919) – Szechwan japalure
- Diploderma flavilabre K. Wang, Che & Siler, 2020 – yellow-lipped mountain dragon
- Diploderma formosgulae K. Wang, Gao, J. Wu, Dong, Shi, Qi, Siler & Che, 2021 – vibrant-gulared mountain dragon
- Diploderma grahami (Stejneger, 1924) – Graham's japalure
- Diploderma gulaense (Cai, Yao, Wu & Guo, 2026) – Gula mountain lizard
- Diploderma hamptoni (M.A. Smith, 1935) – Hampton's japalure
- Diploderma iadinum (K. Wang, Jiang, Siler & Che, 2016) – emerald mountain dragon
- Diploderma jiulongense Liu, Hou, Ananjeva, & Rao, 2023
- Diploderma kangdingense Cai, Zhang, Li, Du, Xie, Hou, Zhou, & Jiang, 2022 – Kangding mountain lizard
- Diploderma laeviventre (K. Wang, Jiang, Siler & Che, 2016) – smooth-venter mountain dragon
- Diploderma limingense Liu, Hou, Rao, & Ananjeva, 2022
- Diploderma luei (Ota, S. Chen & Shang, 1998)
- Diploderma makii (Ota, 1989) – Ota's japalure
- Diploderma menghaiense Liu, Hou, J. Wang, Ananjeva & Rao, 2020 – Menghai mountain lizard
- Diploderma micangshanense (Song, 1987)
- Diploderma ngoclinense (Ananjeva, Orlov & Nguyen, 2017)
- Diploderma panchi K. Wang, Zheng, Xie, Che & Siler, 2020 – Panchi mountain dragon
- Diploderma panlong K. Wang, Che, Siler, 2020 – Pan Long mountain dragon
- Diploderma polygonatum Hallowell, 1861 – Ryukyu japalure, Okinawa tree lizard
- Diploderma qiaojiaense Liu, Hou & Rao, 2024 – Qiaojia mountain dragon
- Diploderma qilin K. Wang, Ren, Che & Siler, 2020 – Qilin mountain dragon
- Diploderma shuoquense Liu, Hou, Rao, & Ananjeva, 2022
- Diploderma slowinskii (Rao, Vindum, Ma, Fu & Wilkinson, 2017)
- Diploderma splendidum (Barbour & Dunn, 1919) – green striped tree dragon, splendid japalure
- Diploderma swild K. Wang, J. Wu, Jiang, J. Chen, Miao, Siler & Che, 2019 – Swild mountain dragon
- Diploderma swinhonis (Günther, 1864) – Taiwan japalure
- Diploderma tachengense Liu, Hou, Ananjeva, & Rao, 2023
- Diploderma varcoae (Boulenger, 1918) – Chinese japalure
- Diploderma vela (K. Wang, Jiang & Che, 2015) – sail mountain lizard, sail japalura
- Diploderma xinlongense Cai, Zhang, Li, Du, Xie, Hou, Zhou, & Jiang, 2022 – Xinlong mountain lizard
- Diploderma yangi K. Wang, Zhang & X. Li, 2022
- Diploderma yongshengense Liu, Hou, Rao, & Ananjeva, 2022
- Diploderma yulongense (Manthey, Denzer, Hou & X. Wang, 2012)
- Diploderma yunnanense (Anderson, 1878) – Yunnan japalure
- Diploderma zhaoermii (Gao & Hou, 2002)

Nota bene: a binomial authority in parentheses indicates that the species was originally described in a genus other than Diploderma.
