= Diploderma qilin =

Scientific classification
- Kingdom: Animalia
- Phylum: Chordata
- Class: Reptilia
- Order: Squamata
- Suborder: Iguania
- Family: Agamidae
- Genus: Diploderma
- Species: D. qilin

Binomial name
- Diploderma qilin Wang, Ren, Che, & Siler, 2020

Species of lizard

Diploderma qilin, the Qilin mountain dragon, is endemic to China.
