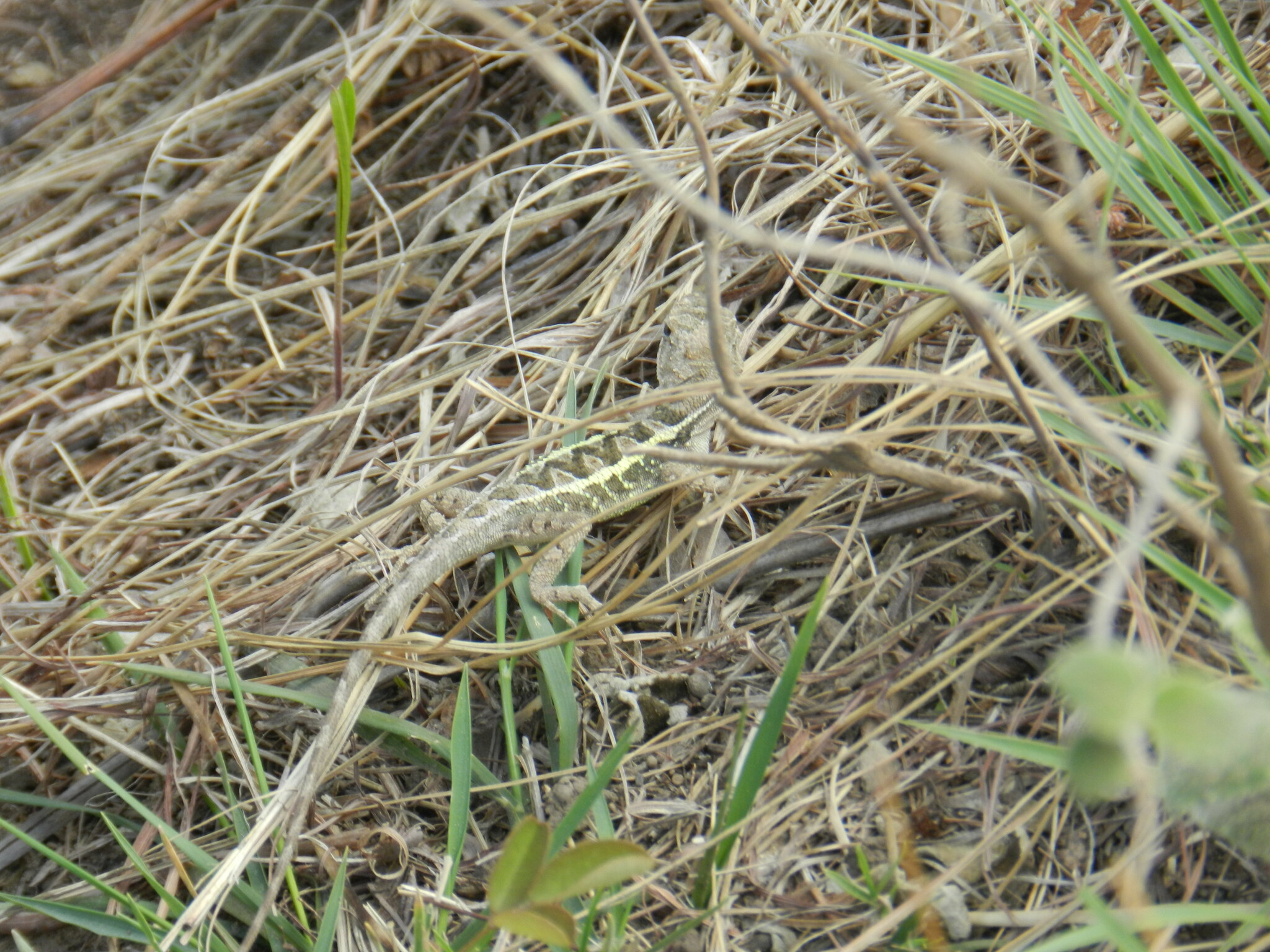

Scientific classification
- Kingdom: Animalia
- Phylum: Chordata
- Class: Reptilia
- Order: Squamata
- Suborder: Iguania
- Family: Agamidae
- Genus: Diploderma
- Species: D. brevicauda

Binomial name
- Diploderma brevicauda (Manthey, Denzer, Hou, & Wang, 2012)

= Diploderma brevicauda =

Species of lizard

Diploderma brevicauda is a species of reptile endemic to China.
