= Diploderma zhaoermii =

Conservation status
- Least Concern (IUCN 3.1)

Scientific classification
- Kingdom: Animalia
- Phylum: Chordata
- Class: Reptilia
- Order: Squamata
- Suborder: Iguania
- Family: Agamidae
- Genus: Diploderma
- Species: D. zhaoermii

Binomial name
- Diploderma zhaoermii (Gao & Hou, 2002)

Synonyms
- Japalura zhaoermii Gao & Hou, 2002; Diploderma zhaoermii — Wang et al., 2018

Species of reptile

Diploderma zhaoermii is a species of lizard in the family Agamidae. The species is endemic to Sichuan, China.

== Etymology ==
The specific name, zhaoermii, is in honor of Chinese herpetologist Zhao Er-mi.

== Geographic range ==
D. zhaoermii is found in western Sichaun province, China.

== Habitat ==
The preferred natural habitat of D. zhaoermii is shrubland, at altitudes of 1,200–1,600 m (3,900–5,200 ft).

== Taxonomy ==
D. zhaoermii was first collected in 1933, but not described until 2002.

== Reproduction ==
D. zhaoermii is oviparous.
