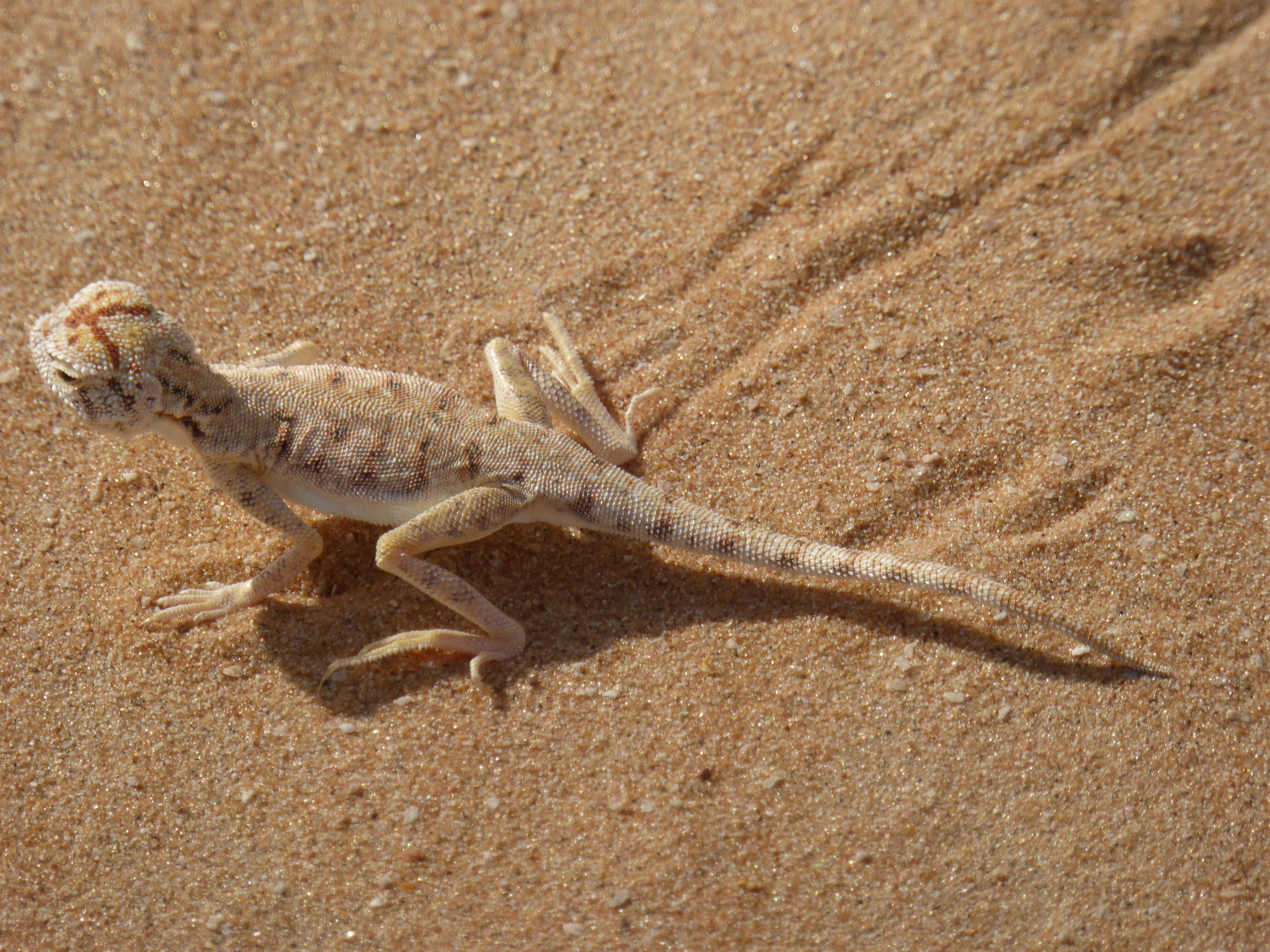

Scientific classification
- Kingdom: Animalia
- Phylum: Chordata
- Class: Reptilia
- Order: Squamata
- Suborder: Iguania
- Family: Agamidae
- Genus: Phrynocephalus
- Species: P. sakoi

Binomial name
- Phrynocephalus sakoi Melnikov, Melnikova, Nazarov, Al-Johany, & Ananjeva, 2015

= Phrynocephalus sakoi =

Species of lizard

Phrynocephalus sakoi is a species of agamid lizard. It is endemic to Oman.
