= Diploderma drukdaypo =

Scientific classification
- Kingdom: Animalia
- Phylum: Chordata
- Class: Reptilia
- Order: Squamata
- Suborder: Iguania
- Family: Agamidae
- Genus: Diploderma
- Species: D. drukdaypo

Binomial name
- Diploderma drukdaypo Wang, Ren, Jiang, Zou, Wu, Che, & Siler, 2019

Species of reptile

Diploderma drukdaypo, also known as the dwarf mountain dragon, is a species of lizard native to Tibet.
