= Diploderma slowinskii =

Scientific classification
- Kingdom: Animalia
- Phylum: Chordata
- Class: Reptilia
- Order: Squamata
- Suborder: Iguania
- Family: Agamidae
- Genus: Diploderma
- Species: D. slowinskii

Binomial name
- Diploderma slowinskii Rao, Vindum, Ma, Fu, and Wilkinson, 2017

Synonyms
- Japalura slowinskii

Species of lizard

Diploderma slowinskii is a species of lizard, which was first identified in the Yunnan province of China in 2017. The lizard is named after American herpetologist, Joseph Bruno Slowinski.

== Description ==
The lizard is relatively large, it has a robust head and a compressed body. Its reproduction is oviparous.
