= Cyrtodactylus caovansungi =

Conservation status
- Endangered (IUCN 3.1)

Scientific classification
- Kingdom: Animalia
- Phylum: Chordata
- Class: Reptilia
- Order: Squamata
- Suborder: Gekkota
- Family: Gekkonidae
- Genus: Cyrtodactylus
- Species: C. caovansungi

Binomial name
- Cyrtodactylus caovansungi Orlov, T.Q. Nguyen, Nazarov, Ananjeva & N.S. Nguyen, 2007

Species of lizard

Cyrtodactylus caovansungi is a species of gecko, a lizard in the family Gekkonidae. The species is endemic to Vietnam.

== Etymology ==
The specific name, caovansungi, is in honor of Vietnamese biologist Cao Van Sung.

== Geographic range ==
C. caovansungi is found in southern Vietnam, in Ninh Thuan Province

== Habitat ==
The preferred natural habitat of C. caovansungi is forest at an altitude of 400 m (1,300 ft).

== Description ==
Relatively large for its genus, C. caovansungi may attain a snout-to-vent length (SVL) of 9.4 cm (3.7 in), plus a tail length of 12 cm (4.7 in).

== Reproduction ==
C. caovansungi is oviparous.
