= Diploderma daduense =

Scientific classification
- Kingdom: Animalia
- Phylum: Chordata
- Class: Reptilia
- Order: Squamata
- Suborder: Iguania
- Family: Agamidae
- Genus: Diploderma
- Species: D. daduense

Binomial name
- Diploderma daduense Cai, Liu & Chang 2024

Species of lizard

Diploderma daduense is a species of lizard in the genus Diploderma of the Agamidae family. This species was reported from lower Dadu River Valley, Sichuan Province, Western China. D. daduense shows a unique combination of morphological attributes and distinct genetic divergence compare with near relatives.
