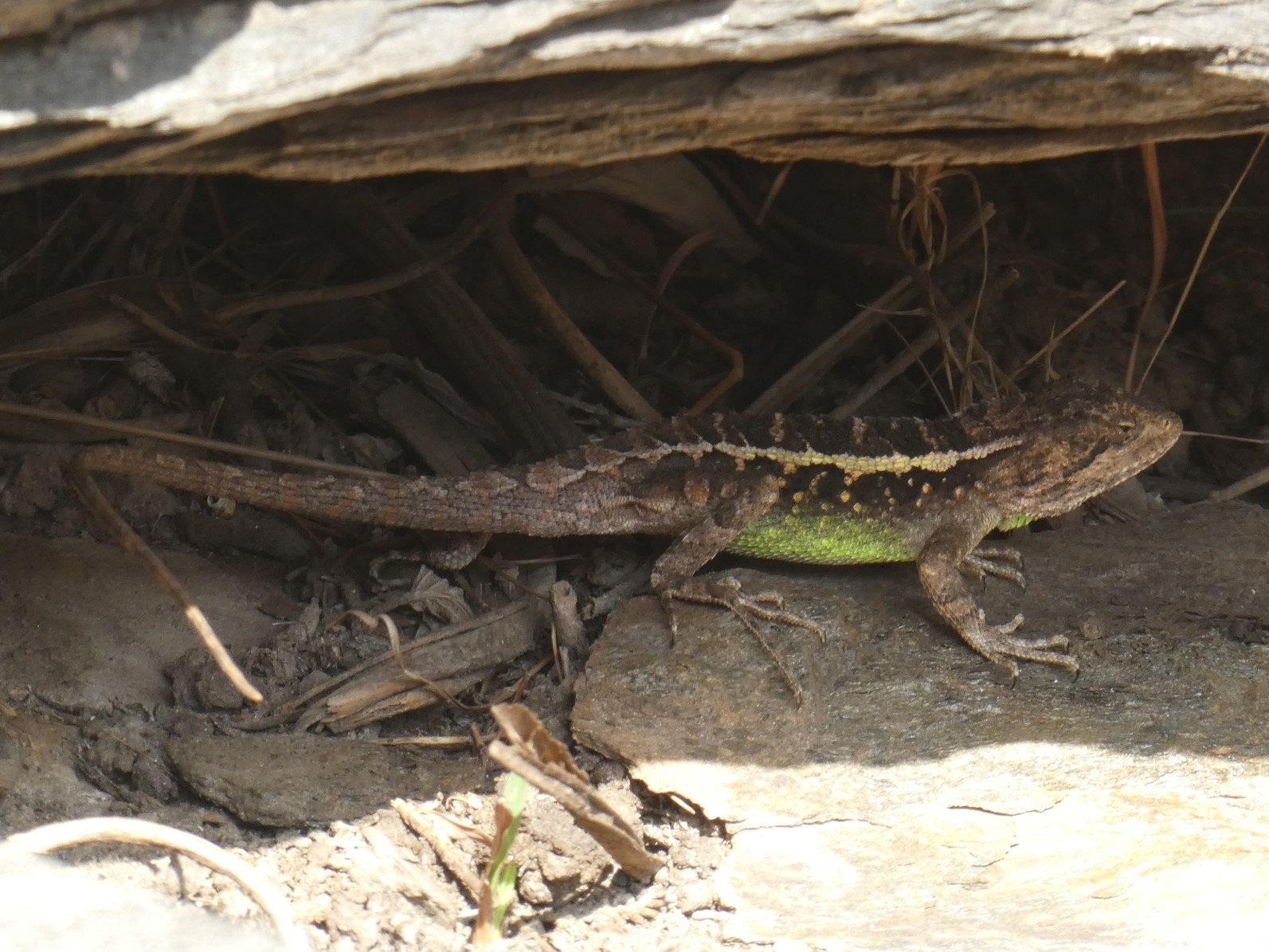

Scientific classification
- Kingdom: Animalia
- Phylum: Chordata
- Class: Reptilia
- Order: Squamata
- Suborder: Iguania
- Family: Agamidae
- Genus: Diploderma
- Species: D. yulongense

Binomial name
- Diploderma yulongense (Manthey, Denzer, Hou & Wang, 2012)

Synonyms
- Japalura yulongensis Manthey, Denzer, Hou & Wang, 2012

= Diploderma yulongense =

Species of lizard

Diploderma yulongense is a species of lizard found in the Chinese province of Yunnan. It was first collected in 1914, but not recorded again in the wild until 2012, when it was described based on the original and new specimens.
