= Scincella darevskii =

Conservation status
- Data Deficient (IUCN 3.1)

Scientific classification
- Kingdom: Animalia
- Phylum: Chordata
- Class: Reptilia
- Order: Squamata
- Family: Scincidae
- Genus: Scincella
- Species: S. darevskii

Binomial name
- Scincella darevskii Nguyen, Ananjeva, Orlov, Rybaltovsky, & Böhme, 2010

Species of lizard

Darevsky's ground skink (Scincella darevskii) is a species of skink in the family Scincidea found in Vietnam in forests. They are large in size for skinks being around 88.6 millimeters long.
