= Diploderma micangshanense =

Conservation status
- Least Concern (IUCN 3.1)

Scientific classification
- Kingdom: Animalia
- Phylum: Chordata
- Class: Reptilia
- Order: Squamata
- Suborder: Iguania
- Family: Agamidae
- Genus: Diploderma
- Species: D. micangshanense

Binomial name
- Diploderma micangshanense (Song, 1987)

Synonyms
- Japalura micangshanensis Song, 1987; Diploderma micangshanensis (Song, 1987); Japalura ningjiangensis Song, 1987

Species of reptile

Diploderma micangshanense is a species of lizard. It is endemic to central and southern China and known from the provinces of Gansu, Henan, Shaanxi, Shanxi, and Sichuan.
