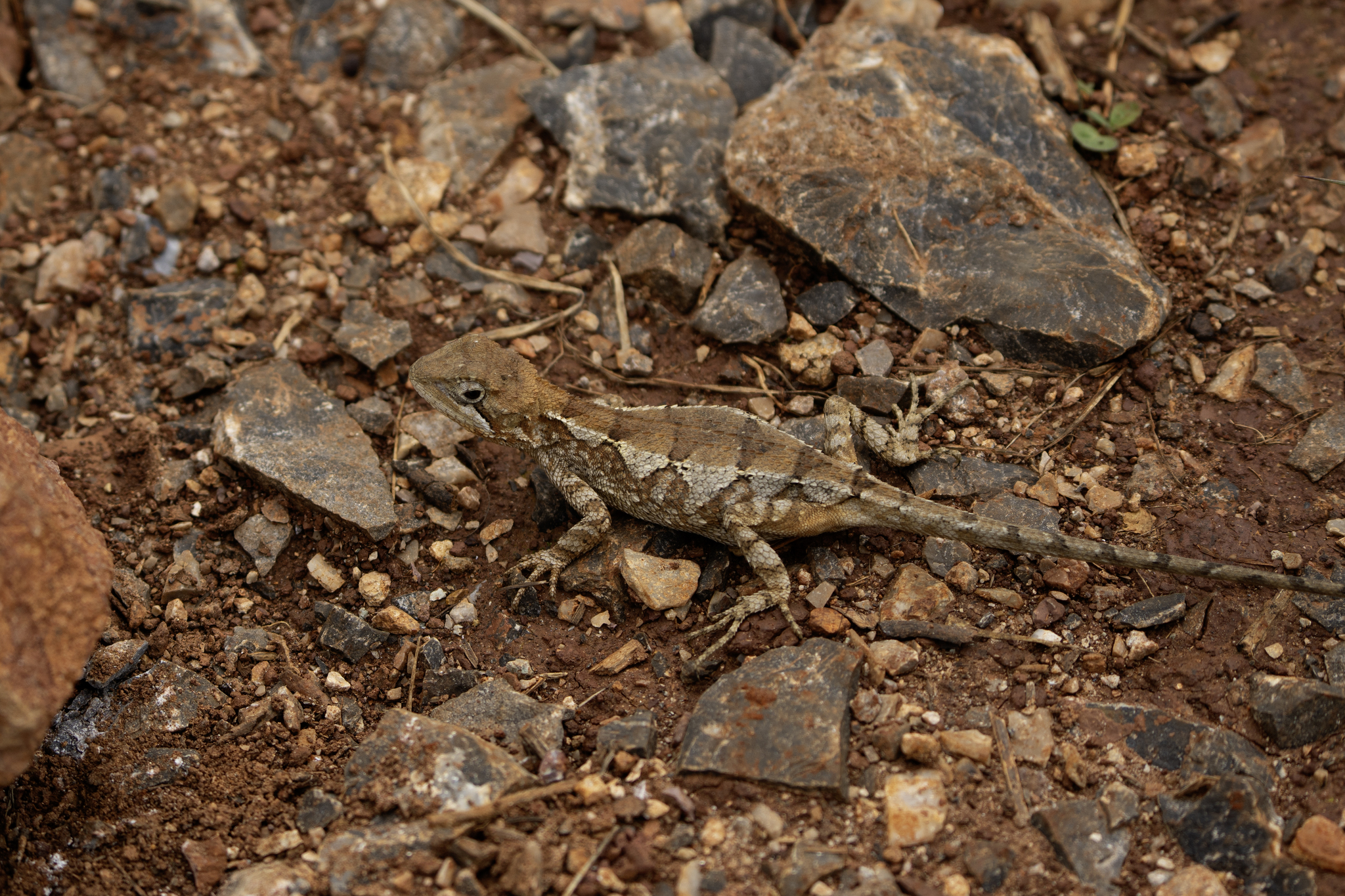

Conservation status
- Least Concern (IUCN 3.1)

Scientific classification
- Kingdom: Animalia
- Phylum: Chordata
- Class: Reptilia
- Order: Squamata
- Suborder: Iguania
- Family: Agamidae
- Genus: Diploderma
- Species: D. varcoae

Binomial name
- Diploderma varcoae Boulenger, 1918

= Diploderma varcoae =

Species of lizard

Diploderma varcoae, the Chinese japalure, is a species of lizard endemic to China.
