= Cyrtodactylus chauquangensis =

Scientific classification
- Kingdom: Animalia
- Phylum: Chordata
- Class: Reptilia
- Order: Squamata
- Suborder: Gekkota
- Family: Gekkonidae
- Genus: Cyrtodactylus
- Species: C. chauquangensis

Binomial name
- Cyrtodactylus chauquangensis Quang, Orlov, Ananjeva, Johns, Ngoc Thao, & Quang Vinh, 2007

Species of lizard

Cyrtodactylus chauquangensis is a species of gecko that is endemic to Vietnam.
