= Diploderma panlong =

Scientific classification
- Kingdom: Animalia
- Phylum: Chordata
- Class: Reptilia
- Order: Squamata
- Suborder: Iguania
- Family: Agamidae
- Genus: Diploderma
- Species: D. panlong

Binomial name
- Diploderma panlong Wang, Che, & Siler, 2020

Species of lizard

Diploderma panlong, the Pan Long mountain dragon, is endemic to China.
