= Diploderma ngoclinense =

Scientific classification
- Kingdom: Animalia
- Phylum: Chordata
- Class: Reptilia
- Order: Squamata
- Suborder: Iguania
- Family: Agamidae
- Genus: Diploderma
- Species: D. ngoclinense

Binomial name
- Diploderma ngoclinense (Ananjeva, Orlov, & Nguyen, 2017)

Species of reptile

Diploderma ngoclinense is a species of lizard native to Vietnam.
