= Diploderma panchi =

Scientific classification
- Kingdom: Animalia
- Phylum: Chordata
- Class: Reptilia
- Order: Squamata
- Suborder: Iguania
- Family: Agamidae
- Genus: Diploderma
- Species: D. panchi

Binomial name
- Diploderma panchi Wang, Jiang, Zheng, Xie, Che, & Siler, 2020

Species of lizard

Diploderma panchi, the Panchi mountain dragon, is a species of lizard endemic to China. The Diploderma panchi is closely related to the Diploderma xinlongense. However, the Diploderma panchi is slightly larger, has more suborbital scale rows, and does not have cyan gular spots.
