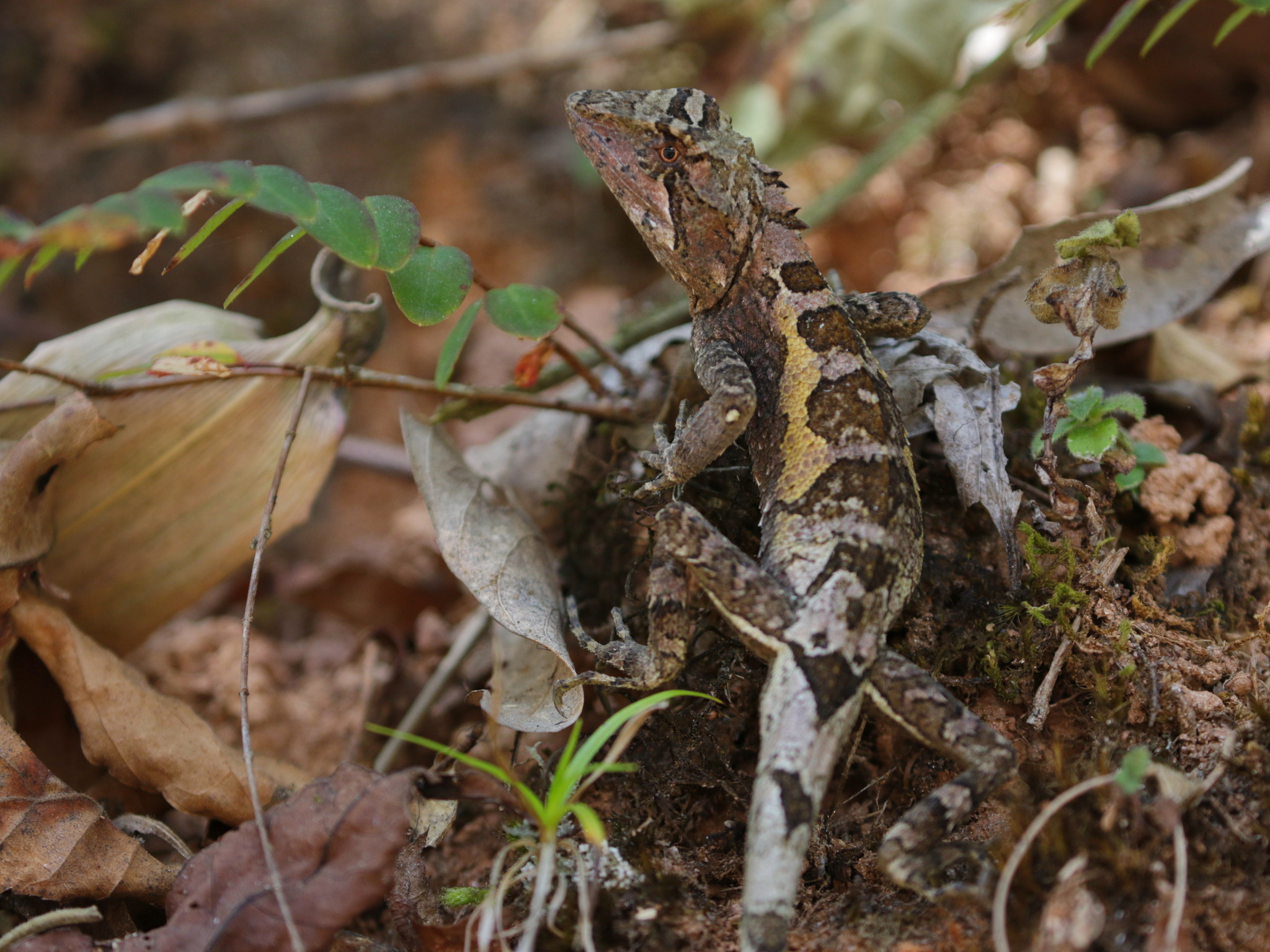

Scientific classification
- Kingdom: Animalia
- Phylum: Chordata
- Class: Reptilia
- Order: Squamata
- Suborder: Iguania
- Family: Agamidae
- Genus: Diploderma
- Species: D. menghaiense

Binomial name
- Diploderma menghaiense Liu, Hou, Wang, Ananjeva, & Rao, 2020

= Diploderma menghaiense =

Species of reptile

Diploderma menghaiense, also known as the Menghai mountain lizard, is a species of lizard native to China.
