= Diploderma chapaense =

Scientific classification
- Kingdom: Animalia
- Phylum: Chordata
- Class: Reptilia
- Order: Squamata
- Suborder: Iguania
- Family: Agamidae
- Genus: Diploderma
- Species: D. chapaense

Binomial name
- Diploderma chapaense (Bourret, 1937)

Species of lizard

Diploderma chapaense is endemic to Vietnam.
