= Diploderma bifluviale =

Scientific classification
- Kingdom: Animalia
- Phylum: Chordata
- Class: Reptilia
- Order: Squamata
- Suborder: Iguania
- Family: Agamidae
- Genus: Diploderma
- Species: D. bifluviale

Binomial name
- Diploderma bifluviale F. Liu, Wu, Zhang, Yang, S. Liu, Chen, Chang, Xie & Cai, 2025

Species of lizard

Diploderma bifluviale, the Upper Dadu mountain lizard, is a species of lizard in the genus Diploderma found in the Dadu River valley in Sichuan Province, China. It was first described by Fengjing Liu, Yayong Wu, Jindong Zhang, Guang Yang, Shuo Liu, Xue Chen, Jiang Chang, Qiang Xie, and Bo Cai in a 2025 paper.

== Etymology ==
The species name bifluviale comes from the Latin terms bi- (two) and fluviale (related to rivers). It refers to the species being discovered near Shuangjiangkou, which is located where the Chuosijia River and Jiaomuzu River meet. The common name "Upper Dadu mountain dragon" refers to the upper Dadu River valley where the species is found. Both the English common name and its Chinese common name, 双江口攀蜥 (pinyin: shuāngjiāngkǒu pānxī) were proposed by the authors of the paper describing it.

== Description ==
Oral cavity of Diploderma bifluviale. The species' unique wheat-colored tongue is visible.

The snout-vent length ranges from 62.51 to 72.55 millimeters. The tympanum is concealed. There is no gular spot (a circular marking on the gular scales). Males have two pale yellow serrated stripes along their backs. The tongue is wheat-colored, a trait not shared by any other species in the genus. D. bifluviale has been observed to prey on insects in the Dadu River valley.

== Distribution ==
The species is found in the upper portion of the Dadu River valley, at elevations between 2,187 and 2,314 meters.
