= Diploderma batangense =

Conservation status
- Least Concern (IUCN 3.1)

Scientific classification
- Kingdom: Animalia
- Phylum: Chordata
- Class: Reptilia
- Order: Squamata
- Suborder: Iguania
- Family: Agamidae
- Genus: Diploderma
- Species: D. batangense

Binomial name
- Diploderma batangense (Li, Deng, Wu & Wang, 2001)

Synonyms
- Japalura batangensis Li, Deng, Wu & Wang, 2001

Species of lizard

Diploderma batangense is a species of lizard. It is endemic to China and known from eastern Tibet, northern Yunnan, and western Sichuan.
