= Diploderma flaviceps =

Conservation status
- Least Concern (IUCN 3.1)

Scientific classification
- Domain: Eukaryota
- Kingdom: Animalia
- Phylum: Chordata
- Class: Reptilia
- Order: Squamata
- Suborder: Iguania
- Family: Agamidae
- Genus: Diploderma
- Species: D. flaviceps

Binomial name
- Diploderma flaviceps (Barbour & Dunn, 1919)

Species of lizard

Diploderma flaviceps, the Szechwan japalure, is endemic to China.
