= Diploderma yangi =

- Male

Scientific classification
- Kingdom: Animalia
- Phylum: Chordata
- Class: Reptilia
- Order: Squamata
- Suborder: Iguania
- Family: Agamidae
- Genus: Diploderma
- Species: D. yangi

Binomial name
- Diploderma yangi Wang, Zhang, & Li, 2022

Species of lizard

Diploderma yangi is endemic to China.
