= Diploderma laeviventre =

- Male specimen of Diploderma laeviventre

Conservation status
- Least Concern (IUCN 3.1)

Scientific classification
- Kingdom: Animalia
- Phylum: Chordata
- Class: Reptilia
- Order: Squamata
- Suborder: Iguania
- Family: Agamidae
- Genus: Diploderma
- Species: D. laeviventre

Binomial name
- Diploderma laeviventre (Wang, Jiang, Siler, & Che, 2016)

Synonyms
- Japalura laeviventris Wang et al., 2016

Species of reptile

Diploderma laeviventre, also known as the smooth-venter mountain dragon, is a species of lizard that belongs to the family Agamidae (dragon lizards). It is endemic to Tibet, China.
