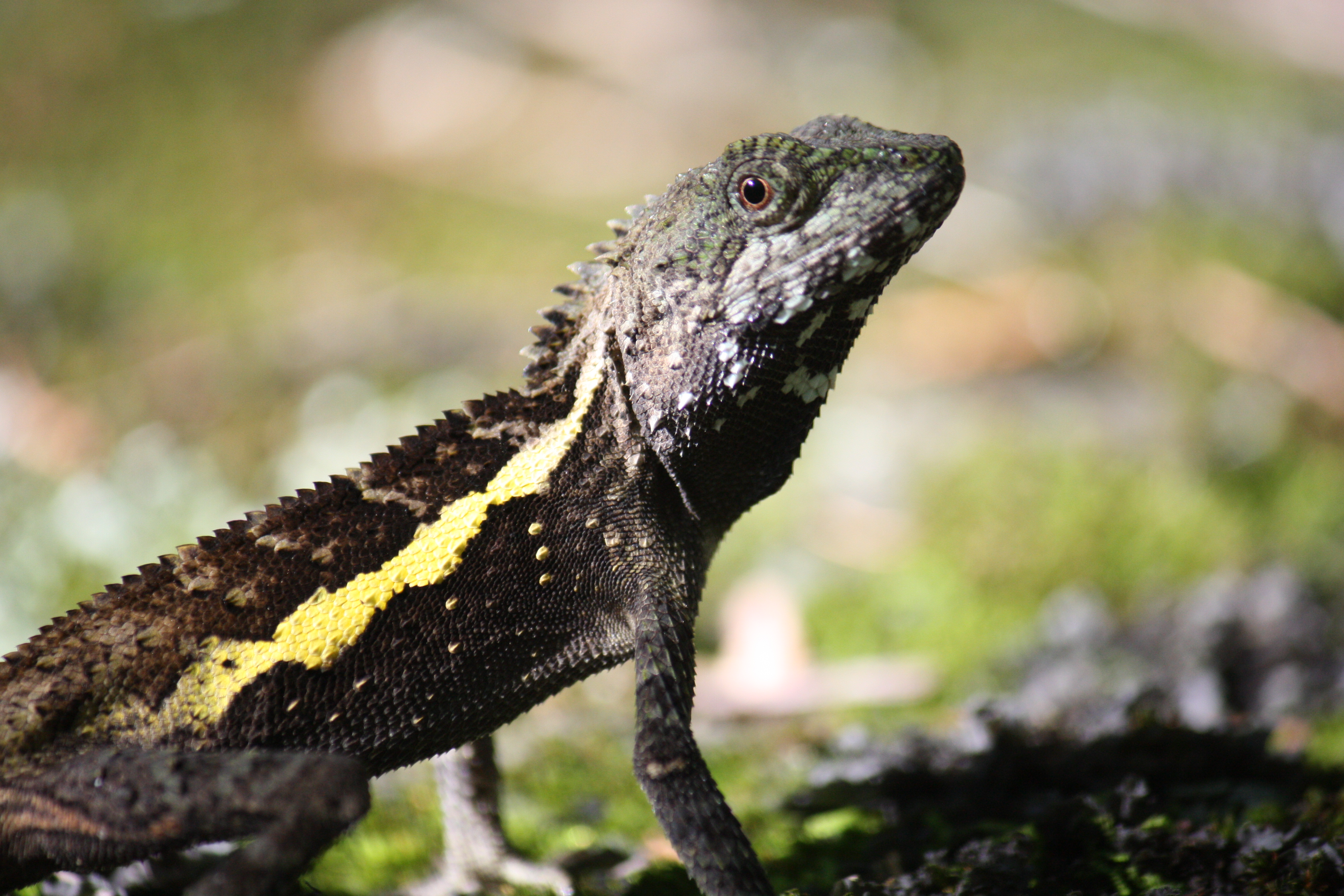
- At Taroko Gorge, Taiwan

Conservation status
- Least Concern (IUCN 3.1)

Scientific classification
- Kingdom: Animalia
- Phylum: Chordata
- Class: Reptilia
- Order: Squamata
- Suborder: Iguania
- Family: Agamidae
- Genus: Diploderma
- Species: D. swinhonis

Binomial name
- Diploderma swinhonis (Günther, 1864)

Synonyms
- List: Japalura swinhonis Günther, 1864; Japalura swinhoei Boettger, 1885 (nomen substitutum); Japalura mitsukurii Stejneger, 1898; Japalura yunnanensis popei Wettstein, 1938; Diploderma swinhonis — K. Wang et al., 2018

= Diploderma swinhonis =

Species of lizard

Diploderma swinhonis, also known commonly as the Taiwan japalure, Swinhoe's japalure, Swinhoe's lizard, and Swinhoe's tree lizard (Chinese: 斯文豪氏攀蜥), is a species of draconid lizard native to Taiwan. It is also an invasive alien species in Japan, after likely being introduced from Taiwan. A foraging ambush predator, this lizard preys primarily on arthropods and remains at the bottom of forests. The male D. swinhonis is physically distinct from the female, with its body size being much larger and having a yellow stripe.

== Etymology ==
Both the specific name, swinhonis, and some of the common names are in honour of English naturalist Robert Swinhoe. In Latin, its generic name, Diploderma, can be broken down into Diplo-, which means "many", and derma, which means "skin". It is also referred to by the common name japalure, which is an outdated common name used to previously identify lizards of the genus Japalura. The generic name, Japalura, is speculated to have derived from an Indian word.

== Taxonomy ==
There are issues with the history of taxonomic classification for Swinhoe's tree lizard. For one, Japalura swinhonis formosensis, which used to be thought of as a subspecies to Swinhoe's tree lizard, and Japalura swinhonis mitsukurii are thought to be synonyms to D. swinhonis. Also, as mentioned before, Jalapura was also used to describe the genus and now further classification has most people using the name D. swinhonis. There has been significant discussion as to the proper taxonomic classifications of several related lizards of the genus Japalura (though now this species is classified under the genus Diploderma). Ota (1991) compared specimens from genus Japalura to classify populations of D. swinhonis from Northern Tawian as its own subspecies, J. polygonata. A 2018 mitochondrial DNA and nuclear DNA analysis defines a single clade within Japalura that encompasses species among mainland China and East Asian Islands. This analysis found that J. swinhonis is closely related to J. polygonata, J. makii, J. tuei, and J. brevipes. The study also supported the use of genus name Diploderma for species apart from the clade spanning across mainland China and East Asian Islands.

== Description ==
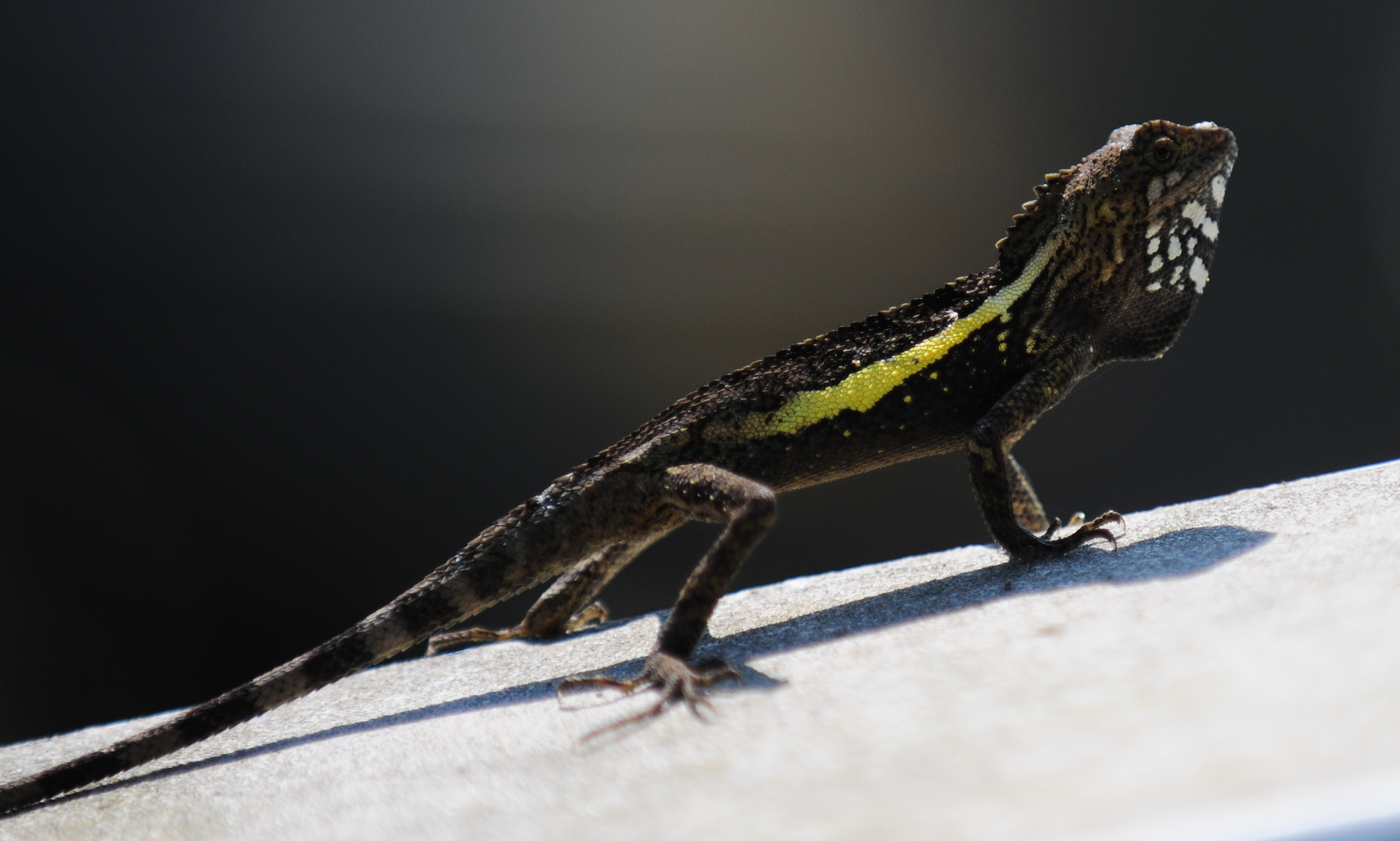
Male D. swinhonis with its characteristic yellow stripe

Diploderma swinhonis exhibit sexual dimorphism, with regard to both coloration and size. The maximum length, including its tail, of D. swinhonis is approximately 31 cm (12 in), its body is 8 cm (3.1 in) long. The average body mass of immature lizards is approximately 2 g (0.071 oz) while the average body mass of mature lizards is approximately 13.4 g (0.47 oz). The male is also known to be significantly larger than the female, with the snout-to-vent length (SVL) for adult males and females being approximately 73 mm (2.9 in) and 62 mm (2.4 in) respectively. Males also have much larger dewlaps than females. Both sexes have brown backs, but males have a brighter color and a yellow stripe on each side of the body. Some of the female lizards have a brown-red pattern on the dorsal side of the body. Males bodies are laterally compressed while female bodies are more cylindrical. In comparison to other lizards of the same genus, D. swinhonis is unique in that it has enlarged scales that occur irregularly across the dorsal side of the lizard. Also, this tree lizard has relatively long limbs compared to other lizards, but the female has shorter limbs, head, and tail in comparison to the male. It is also important to note that there have been physical differences found amongst D. swinhonis based on the region of Taiwan or Japan they are located in, with differences including weight, size, reproductive ability, and reproductive period. Therefore, these lizards do not necessarily have one unique appearance in the environment.

== Diet ==
Diploderma swinhonis is known to be a sit-and-wait predator that primarily feeds on mobile and clearly visible prey by ambushing them. This foraging behavior of ambushing prey is quite common amongst lizards. Swinhoe's tree lizards feeds on arthropods, primarily ants but also other larger insects such as grasshoppers and crickets. D. swinhonis has also been found to feed on bees and spiders, which are also arthropods. It is also very common for iguanian lizards, like D. swinhonis, to eat a large proportion of ants within their diet. Feeding on arthropods active in the daytime, like bees, grasshoppers and ants, is quite common for diurnal species like D. swinhonis while nocturnal arthropods, like crickets, are less commonly eaten. However, D. swinhonis on Orchid island and found to primarily prey on crickets, so there is some variation with regard to their diets between each of their habitats. Due to this variation, D. swinhonis is regarded as a dietary generalist.

== Reproduction ==
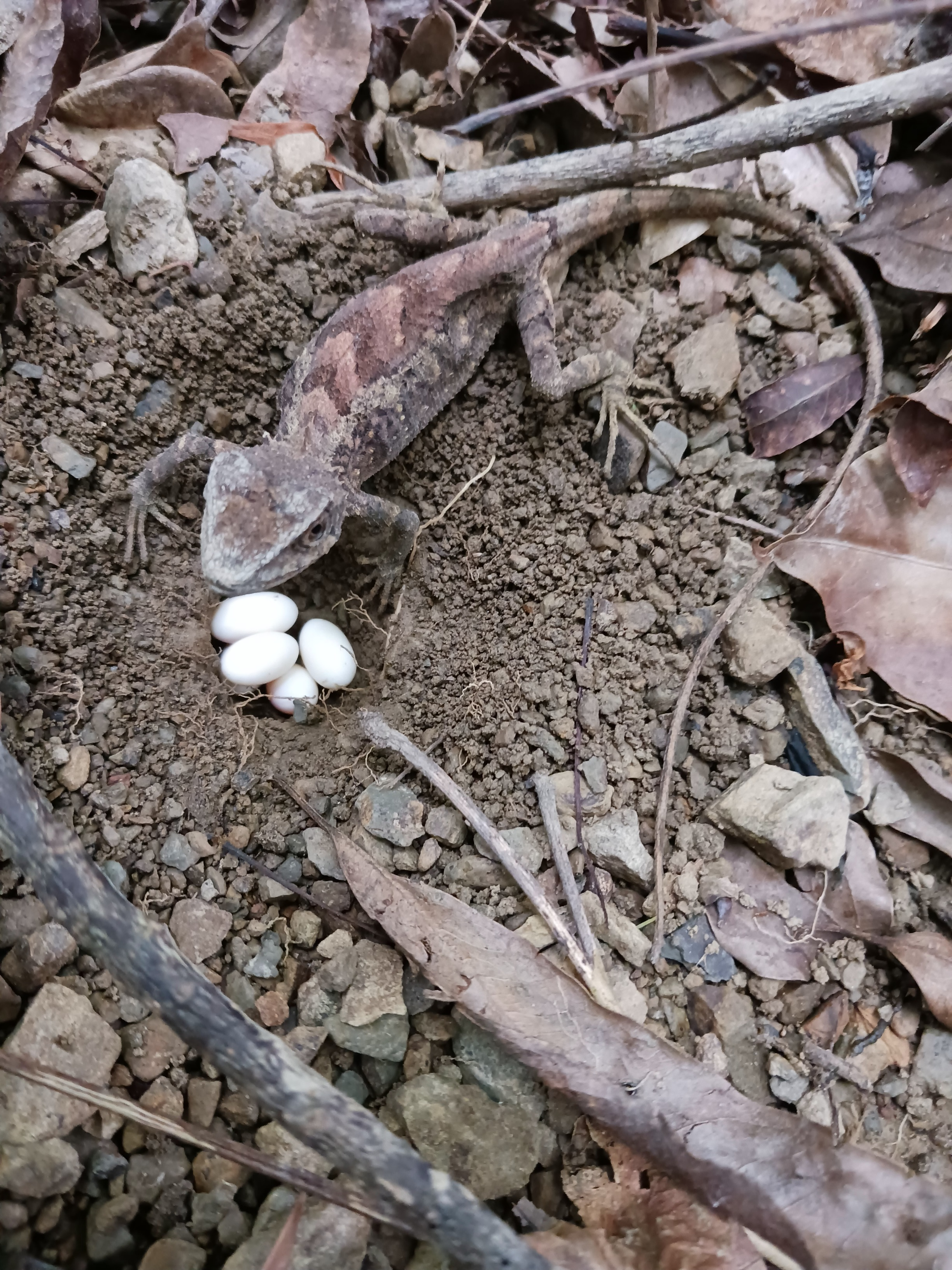
Female guarding eggs

Diploderma swinhonis is reported to sexually reproduce on a seasonal basis, with females being sexually active between the months of March to August and males being sexually active from March to July. Spermatogenesis in males occurs around this same time period that females are laying their eggs. Every year, female D. swinhonis deposit 2 litters of eggs, which include on average 4.27 eggs within every clutch. Also, eggs within the same clutch have been found to have similarities in terms of their physical dimensions. D. swinhonis is known to reproduce oviparously. The lizard's reproductive cycle is quite similar to other lizards within Japan and other reptiles living in temperate areas. It is also known that D. swinhonis female lizards take approximately 350 days to mature while male lizards take between 140 and 260 days to mature depending on whether they are from a late or early clutch. Therefore, the male lizards take less time to mature in comparison to the females. Also, it has been found that female lizards with snout-to-vent lengths greater than 50.2 mm (1.98 in) are sexually mature. Similarly, male lizards with snout-to-vent lengths greater than 53 mm (2.1 in) are also considered mature. These sizes are due to the growth needed for spermatogenesis and the development of ovarian follicles in males and females respectively.

=== Life cycle ===
Male and female Diploderma swinhonis have a monthly mortality of around 20%, and there is significant mortality prior to maturity. Specifically, around 88% of eggs do not survive past the initial incubation period of 30 days. This high level of mortality means that reproduction does not occur as quickly compared to other species of lizards. There are fluctuations in the population size of male lizards from fighting amongst each other when defending their territories and or competing for mates or resources, but female lizard population size is rather constant since their role does not describe the aforementioned behavior.

== Behaviour and habitat ==
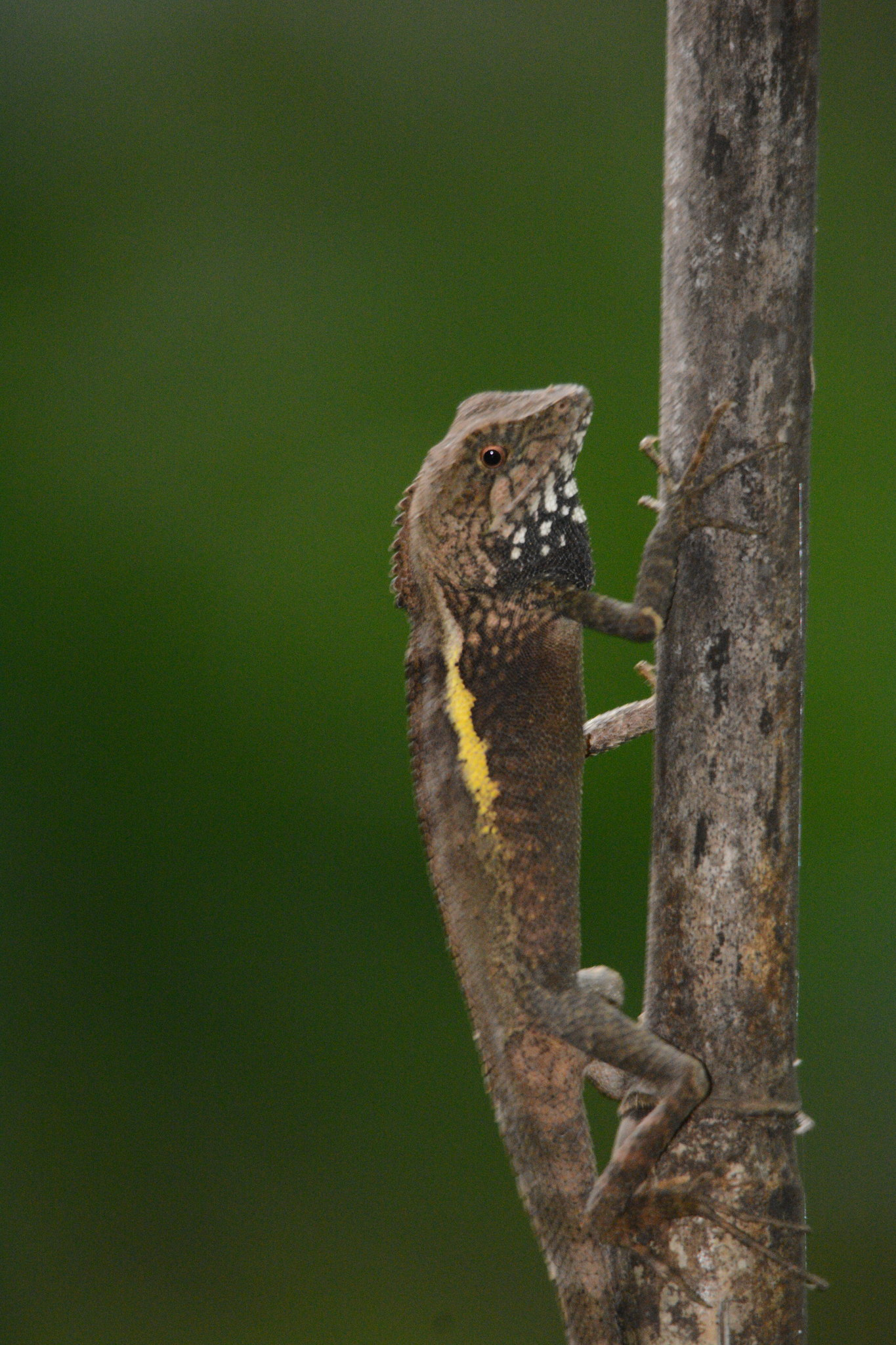
Climbing, in Taiwan

Diploderma swinhonis is arboreal (or preferential to tree habitats) and lives at low altitudes below 1,500 m (4,900 ft) in lowland forests within Taiwan. The lizard is diurnal and is commonly found in wide-ranging habitats that include forests and urban areas, such as shopping malls. This indicates that the lizard is able to adapt quite well to various environments. Additionally, it is known to reside close to the ground on tree trunks and forage on the ground. Males are typically at greater altitudes on the trees, while females and juveniles reside closer to the ground and near bushes. Male D. swinhonis use aggressive displays to maintain their territory, and the lizard is known to be an opportunistic predator that waits and ambushes their prey. The males have been found to be territorial in order to increase chances of mating rather than protecting a food resource. Larger male lizards have a competitive edge over smaller male lizards in finding mates and maintaining their territory. Therefore, there is competition within the species in order to find mates. The advantage of being larger might be why males are currently so much larger than females. Between two and three females are found within each male's territory, and females primarily dig a nest and guard their eggs, causing them to have comparatively smaller ranges. In the presence of another animal, the male expands their throat to display white spots inside their throat and scare the intruder. Within Taiwan, these lizards are known to hibernate between the months of November and March. They are not commonly found when hibernating, but are found outside of this time. The only predator currently found to prey on D. swinhonis is the brown shrike, but only during its migration season. With regard to the territories that the male D. swinhonis reside within and defend, they are established once the male is large enough). Additionally, males stay within the range that defines their home territory for when they are reproducing and also when they are not reproducing. Females on the other hand can leave these ranges after the reproductive season is over, which likely occurs for the purpose of increasing reproductive success with other mates.

=== Distribution ===
Diploderma swinhonis is native to Taiwan, where it is found on the peripheral islands of Taiwan, Orchid Island, Green Island, and Xiaoliuqiu. The species has been found in Japan, possibly carried there by humans. The lizard's presence in Japan is considered as an invasive species. This invasion may have originated from Taiwan as an accidental import on plants. The first recording of the lizard's presence in Japan was noted in 2006. The lizard is now found in multiple regions of Japan. Within Taiwan, D. swinhonis is found in areas with adequate sunlight that are below an elevation of 1500 m. This includes both wooded areas and forests not near human activity along with areas with humans, such as schools, malls, etc.

== Conservation status ==
In 2016, the species was first discovered in Japan, which was unprecedented at the time, and the population of this lizard in Japan have since grown. It is now considered an invasive species there, and action may be taken in the future to control it.

There are threats to Diploderma swinhonis in its native Taiwan. Polypedates megacephalus, a frog invasive to Taiwan, has been known to prey on D. swinhonis. Physignathus cocincinus is another invasive species, an agamid lizard native to mainland China and Southeast Asia, that predates upon D. swinhonis. Additionally, there is the possibility that Anolis sagrei, an arboreal anole invasive to Taiwan, can outcompete D. swinhonis. The A. sagrei invasion has resulted in the rapid decline of other lizards in certain regions of Taiwan.

== Relationship with humans ==
Given that Swinhoe's tree lizard preys on arthropods and other invertebrates, it is not a threat to humans. However, destruction of its habitat through forces like deforestation might endanger this species in the future. It has also entered several spaces with human activity, such as backyard gardens and shopping malls.
