= Natalia Ananjeva =

Russian herpetologist

- Наталья Ананьева
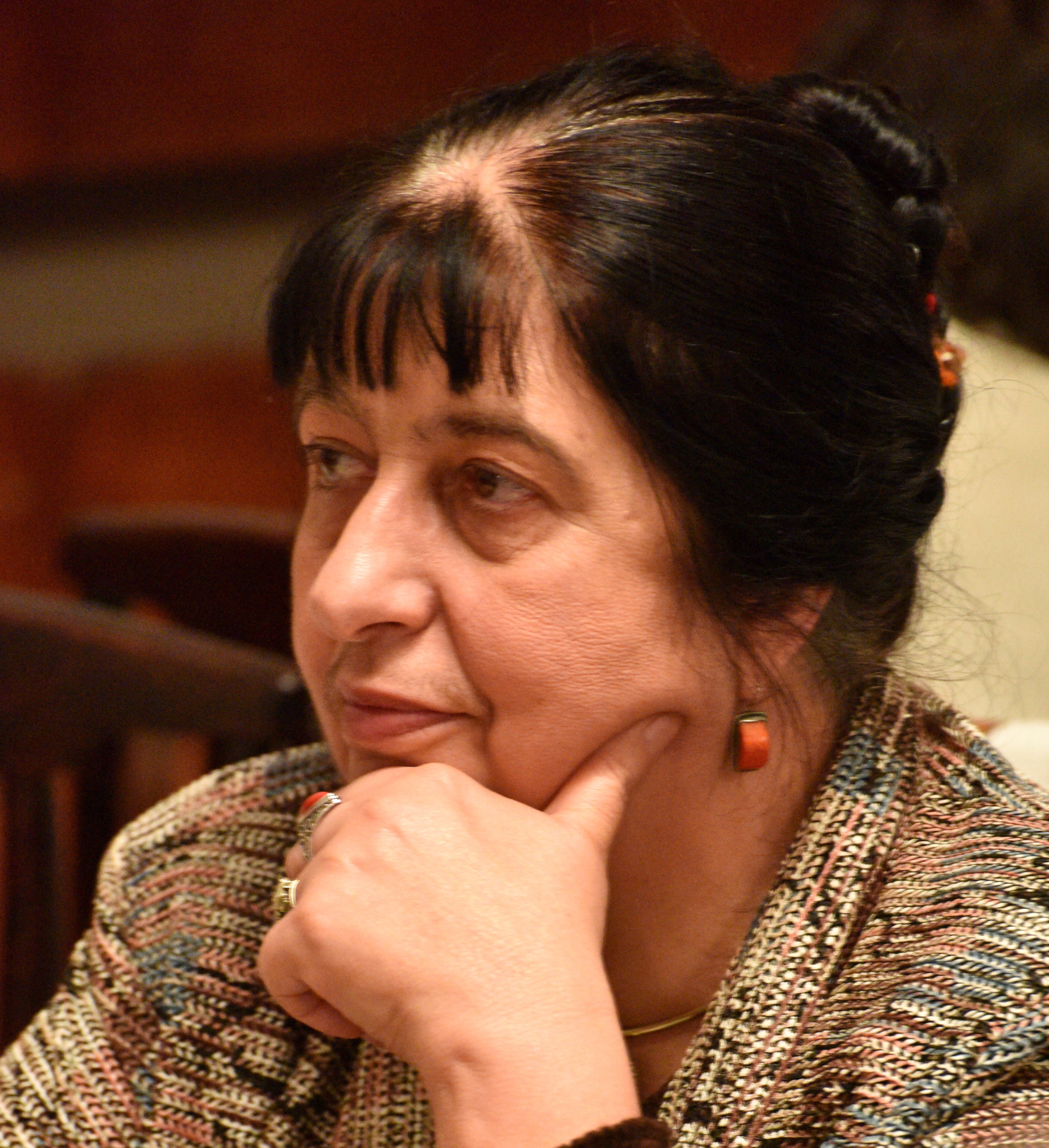
- Born: 5 January 1946 (age 80); Leningrad, USSR
- Education: Academy of Sciences of the Soviet Union
- Occupation: Herpetologist

Natalia Borisovna Ananjeva (Russian: Наталья Ананьева; born 5 January 1946) is a Russian herpetologist, zoologist, and a specialist in taxonomy, phylogeny, the biogeography of Eurasian reptiles and amphibians, and the conservation of their biodiversity.

== Biography ==
Natalia Ananjeva was born in Leningrad on 5 January 1946, to the family of Professor Boris Gerasimovich Ananjev, a psychologist. In 1968, after graduating from Leningrad University, she entered the graduate school of the Zoological Institute of the Academy of Sciences of the Soviet Union. Three years later, she joined the ornithology and herpetology laboratory staff as a junior researcher. In 1993, after defending her doctoral thesis, she became a leading researcher. Since 1996, Ananjeva has served as head of the laboratory of ornithology and herpetology at the Russian Academy of Sciences. From 2006 to 2017, she also served as Deputy Director of Research at the Zoological Institute of the RAS.

== Species named by Ananjeva ==
As of 2021, Ananjeva has taken part in the description of 21 reptile species:

- Acanthosaura brachypoda
- Acanthosaura prasina
- Calamaria concolor
- Colubroelaps nguyenvansangi
- Cophotis dumbara
- Cyrtodactylus caovansungi
- Cyrtodactylus chauquangensis
- Cyrtopodion belaense
- Cyrtopodion golubevi
- Cyrtopodion persepolense
- Diploderma menghaiense
- Diploderma ngoclinense
- Phrynocephalus ahvazicus
- Phrynocephalus sakoi
- Pseudocalotes ziegleri
- Pseudocophotis kontumensis
- Pseudotrapelus aqabensis
- Pseudotrapelus chlodnickii
- Pseudotrapelus jensvindumi
- Scincella darevskii
- Teratoscincus mesriensis

== Species named after Ananjeva ==
- Kurixalus ananjevae
- Phrynocephalus ananjevae
- Ptyodactylus ananjevae
- Acanthosaura nataliae
