= List of reptiles of Korea =

This is a list of reptiles of Korea. It includes reptiles found on the Korean Peninsula as well as the adjoining waters and islands.

== Turtles ==
Scientific name	Common English name	Common Korean name	Image	Distribution	Status
Caretta caretta	Loggerhead sea turtle	붉은바다거북 (red sea turtle)	Caretta caretta		
Chelonia mydas	Green sea turtle	바다거북 (sea turtle)	Chelonia mydas		
Dermochelys coriacea	Leatherback sea turtle	장수거북 (general or giant turtle)	Dermochelys coriacea		I: critically endangered
Chinemys reevesii	Chinese pond turtle	남생이 (namsaengi)			
Trachemys scripta elegans	Red-eared slider	붉은귀거북 (red eared tortoise) or 청거북 (blue tortoise)	Trachemys scripta elegans		
Pelodiscus sinensis	Chinese softshell turtle	중국자라 (Chinese soft-shelled turtle)	Pelodiscus sinensis		
Pelodiscus maackii	Northern Chinese softshell turtle	자라 (soft-shelled turtle)	Pelodiscus maackii		

== Lizards ==
Scientific name	Common English name	Common Korean name	Image	Distribution	Status
Gekko japonicus	Schlegel's Japanese gecko	도마뱀붙이 (gecko)			
Plestiodon coreensis	Smith's skink	장수도마뱀 (long-lived skink)			
Scincella vandenburghi	Korean skink	도마뱀 (skink)			
Scincella huanrenensis	Huanren dwarf skink	북도마뱀 (northern skink)			
Eremias argus	Mongolian racerunner	표범장지뱀 (leopard lizard)			SK: endangered
Takydromus amurensis	Amur grass lizard	아무르장지뱀 (Amur lizard)			
Takydromus wolteri	White-striped grass lizard	줄장지뱀 (stripped lizard)			

== Snakes ==
Scientific name	Authority	Common English name	Common Korean name	Distribution
Dinodon rufozonatum rufozonatum	Cantor	Red-banded snake	능구렁이	Throughout
Elaphe davidi	Sauvage, 1884	David's ratsnake	세줄무늬뱀	Found in North Korea and likely occurs in adjacent areas of northwestern South Korea
Elaphe dione	Pallas	Steppe rat snake or Dione rat snake	누룩뱀, 시루레기, 밀뱀	Common throughout
Elaphe schrenckii, Elaphe anomala	Strauch	Amur rat snake, Korean rat snake, Russian rat snake	먹구렁이 or 흑질백장 when black, 황구렁이 when brown/yellow	Common throughout mainland; not found on Jeju
Elaphe taeniura taeniura	Cope	Korean beauty snake	줄꼬리뱀	Found only in North Korea
Gloydius brevicauda	Stejneger, 1907	Short-tailed mamushi	살모사	Throughout mainland; not found on Jeju
Gloydius saxatilis	Emelianov	Rock mamushi	까치살모사	In the higher reaches of the Taebaek and Sobaek Mountains
Gloydius ussuriensis	Emelianov	Ussuri mamushi	쇠살모사	Throughout
Hebius vibakari ruthveni	Van Denburgh	Asian keelback or Japanese keelback	대륙유혈목이	Most common in the south, particularly Jeju
Hydrophis cyanocinctus	Daudin, 1803	Annulated sea snake	얼룩바다뱀	
Hydrophis melanocephalus	Gray, 1849	Slender-necked sea snake	먹대가리바다뱀	
Oocatochus rufodorsatus	Cantor, 1842	Chinese garter snake, frog-eating rat snake, or red-backed rat snake	무자치, 무좌수, 물뱀, 떼뱀	Throughout
Orientocoluber spinalis	Peters	Slender racer	실뱀, 줄뱀	Throughout; most common in the south
Pelamis platurus	Linnaeus, 1766	Pelagic sea snake or yellow-bellied sea snake	바다뱀	
Rhabdophis tigrinus tigrinus	Boie	Tiger keelback	유혈목이, 꽃뱀	Common throughout
Sibynophis collaris	Gray	Black-headed snake or collared snake	비바리뱀	Jeju (discovered there in 1981)
Vipera berus sachalinensis		Common viper	북살모사	North Korea
