= Qingshui Cliff =

Coastal cliffs in Xiulin Township, Hualien County, Taiwan

Qingshui Cliff 清水斷崖
- Cliffs
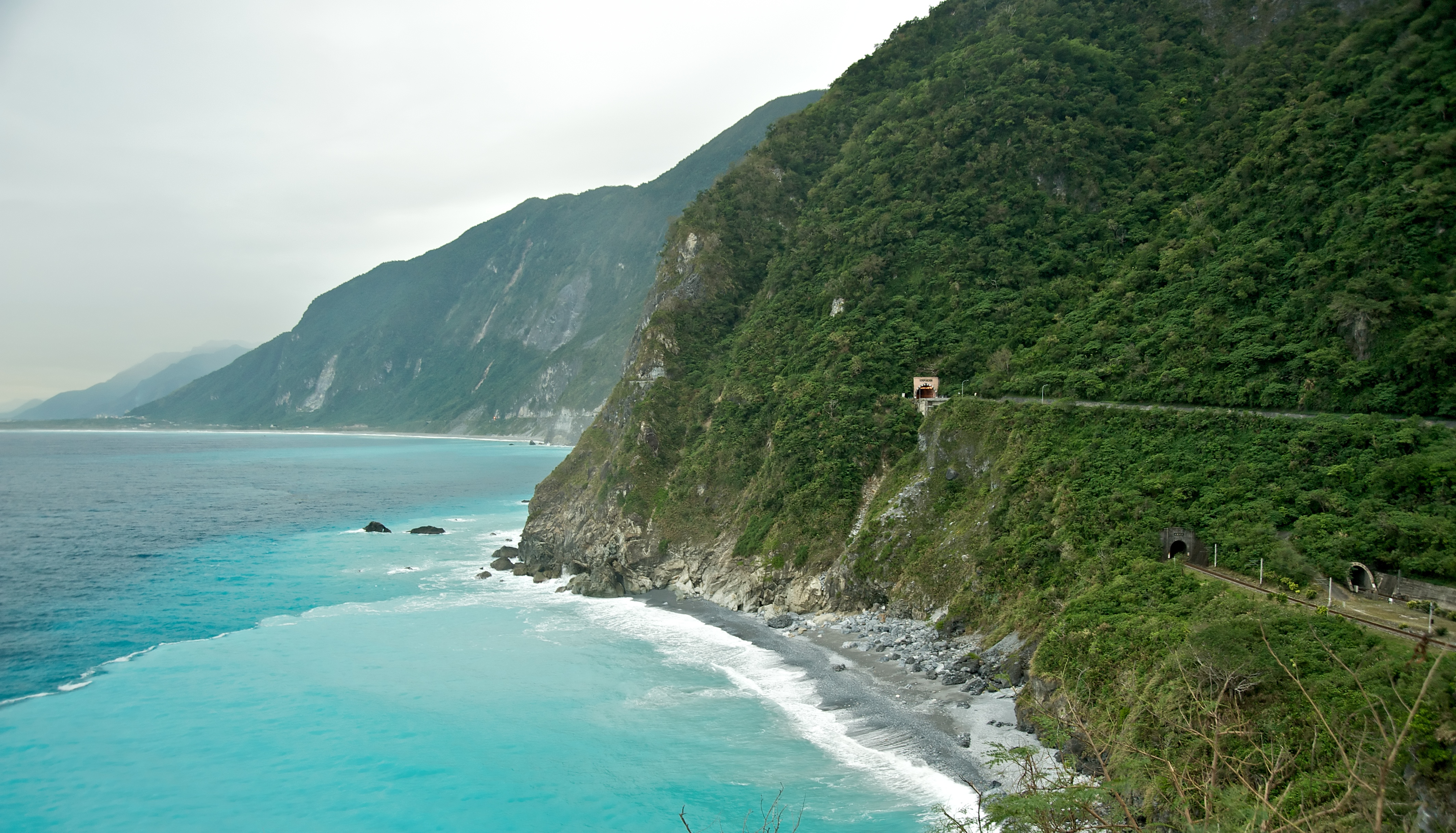

- Location within Taiwan
- Coordinates: 24.2188°N 121.6932°E
- Location: Xiulin, Hualien County, Taiwan
- Geology: Cliff

Dimensions
  - Length: 21 km (13 mi)
- Elevation: 800 m (2,600 ft)
- Highest elevation: 2,408 m (7,900 ft) (Mount Qingshui)

Qingshui Cliff (Chinese: 清水斷崖; Hanyu Pinyin: Qīngshuǐ Duànyá; Tongyong Pinyin: Cingshuěi Duànyá; Wade–Giles: Ch'ing^{1}-shui^{3} Tuan^{4}ya^{2}) is a 21 kilometer length of coastal cliffs averaging 800 meters above sea level in Xiulin Township, Hualien County, Taiwan. The tallest peak, Qingshui Mountain, rises 2408 meters directly from the Pacific Ocean. The cliff is located at the southern part of the Suhua Highway that connects the counties of Yilan and Hualien in eastern Taiwan. It is considered to be a very scenic area and is the highest coastal cliff in Taiwan. It is located within Taroko National Park.

== Geology ==
The formation of the Qingshui Cliff was caused by the orogenic movement, with the Philippine Plate and the Eurasian Plate forming a fault line. The outcropping above sea level is composed of metamorphosed limestone marble, gneiss, and green schist, and is classified as a metamorphic complex area of Dananao on the geological map. Because there are very few coastal cliffs in the world that exhibit such a great elevation drop, the natural landscape of "high cliff valley" makes Qingshui cliff a rare coastal cliff. The coast of the Qingshui Cliff is continually beaten and eroded by the sea water of the Pacific Ocean, and the rock walls on it are subject to natural forces such as earthquakes and typhoons. The beaches below are full of different sizes of marble stones, from giant boulders to grains of sand.

== Political disputes ==
The depiction of Qingshui Cliff is featured in the newly issued passport of the People's Republic of China in 2012, a move that triggered protest from Taipei to Beijing.

== Biogeographic significance ==
Qingshui Cliff can act as a dispersal barrier. It separates the eastern and western clades of brown tree frog (Buergeria robusta) as well as two sibling species of Takydromus lizards, T. viridipunctatus and T. luyeanus. In the latter case, the separation occurs over a single river, the Liwu River.

== Transportation ==
Qingshui Cliff is accessible southwest from Heren Station of the Taiwan Railway.

On April 2, 2021, a Taroko Express train derailed at the entrance of Daqingshui Tunnel near the cliffs after it collided with a truck that rolled down onto the tracks, killing at least 51.

== Gallery ==
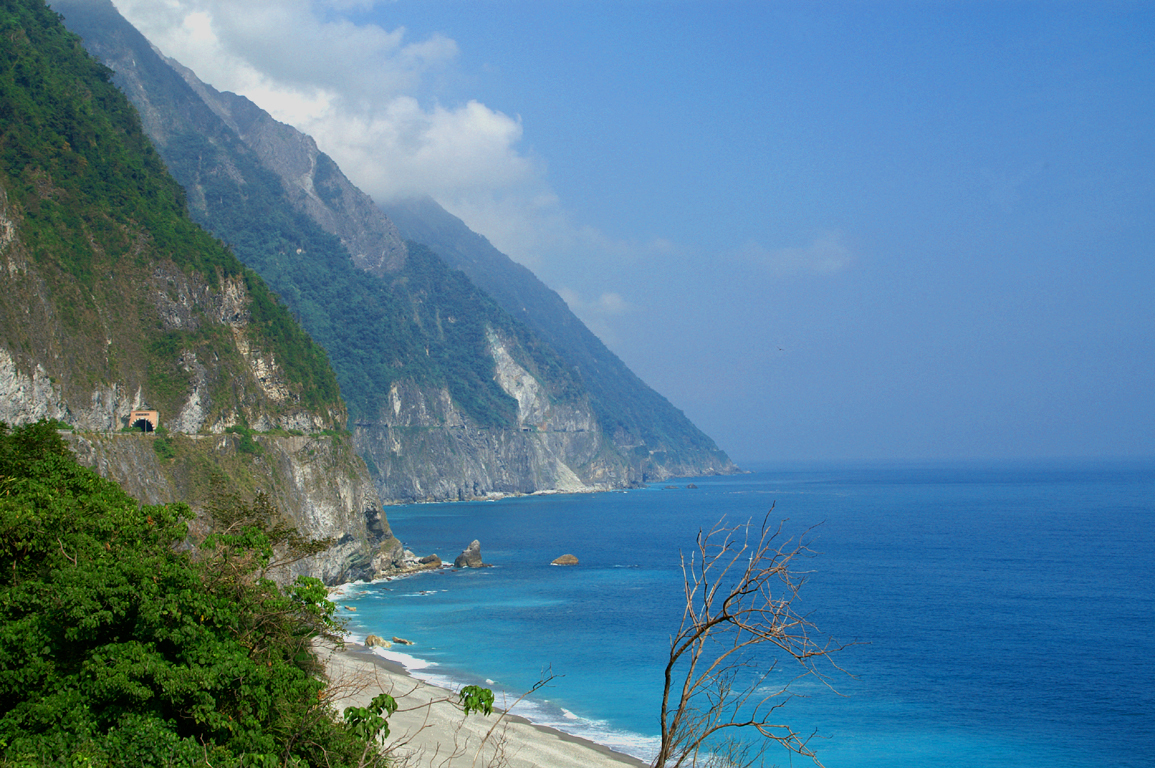

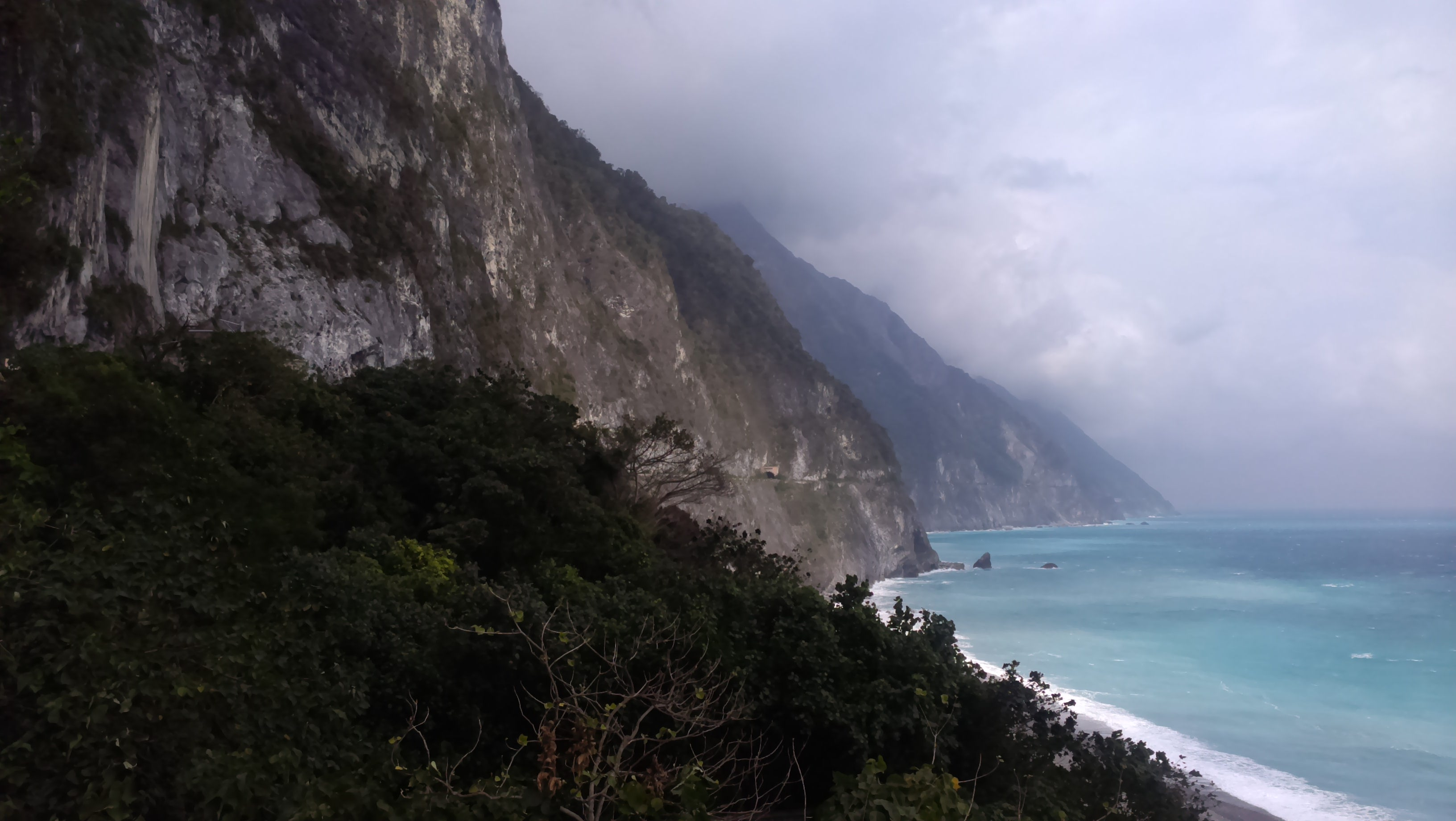

== See also ==
- List of tourist attractions in Taiwan
- Geology of Taiwan
- Taroko National Park
- National parks of Taiwan
- Daqingshui Tunnel
