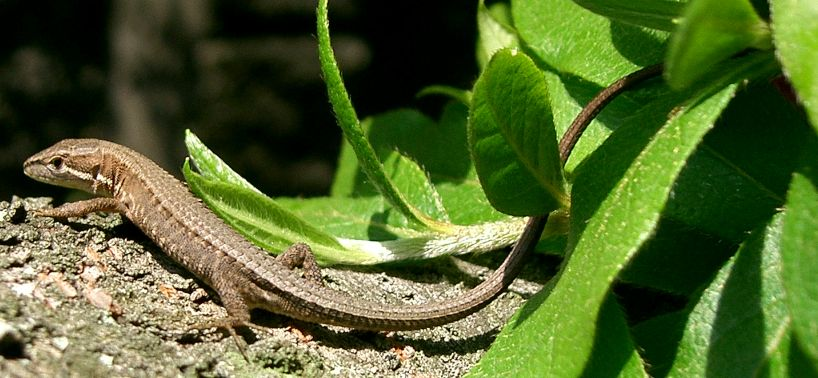

Conservation status
- Least Concern (IUCN 3.1)

Scientific classification
- Kingdom: Animalia
- Phylum: Chordata
- Class: Reptilia
- Order: Squamata
- Family: Lacertidae
- Genus: Takydromus
- Species: T. tachydromoides

Binomial name
- Takydromus tachydromoides (Schlegel, 1838)

= Takydromus tachydromoides =

Species of lizard

Takydromus tachydromoides, the Japanese grass lizard, is a wall lizard species of the genus Takydromus. It is found in Japan. Its Japanese name is 'kanahebi' (ニホンカナヘビ). 'Hebi' means 'snake' in Japanese, although this lizard is not a snake. There are three species of lizards found on the four main islands of Japan. The other two are the Japanese gekko (also known as Schlegel's Japanese gekko, Gekko japonicus, or 'yamori' (ヤモリ) in Japanese) and the Okada's Five-lined Skink (Eumeces latiscutatus, also Plestiodon latiscutatus; the five lines on its back are only visible in its juvenile form).

It is a type of reptile characterized by its powerful running.

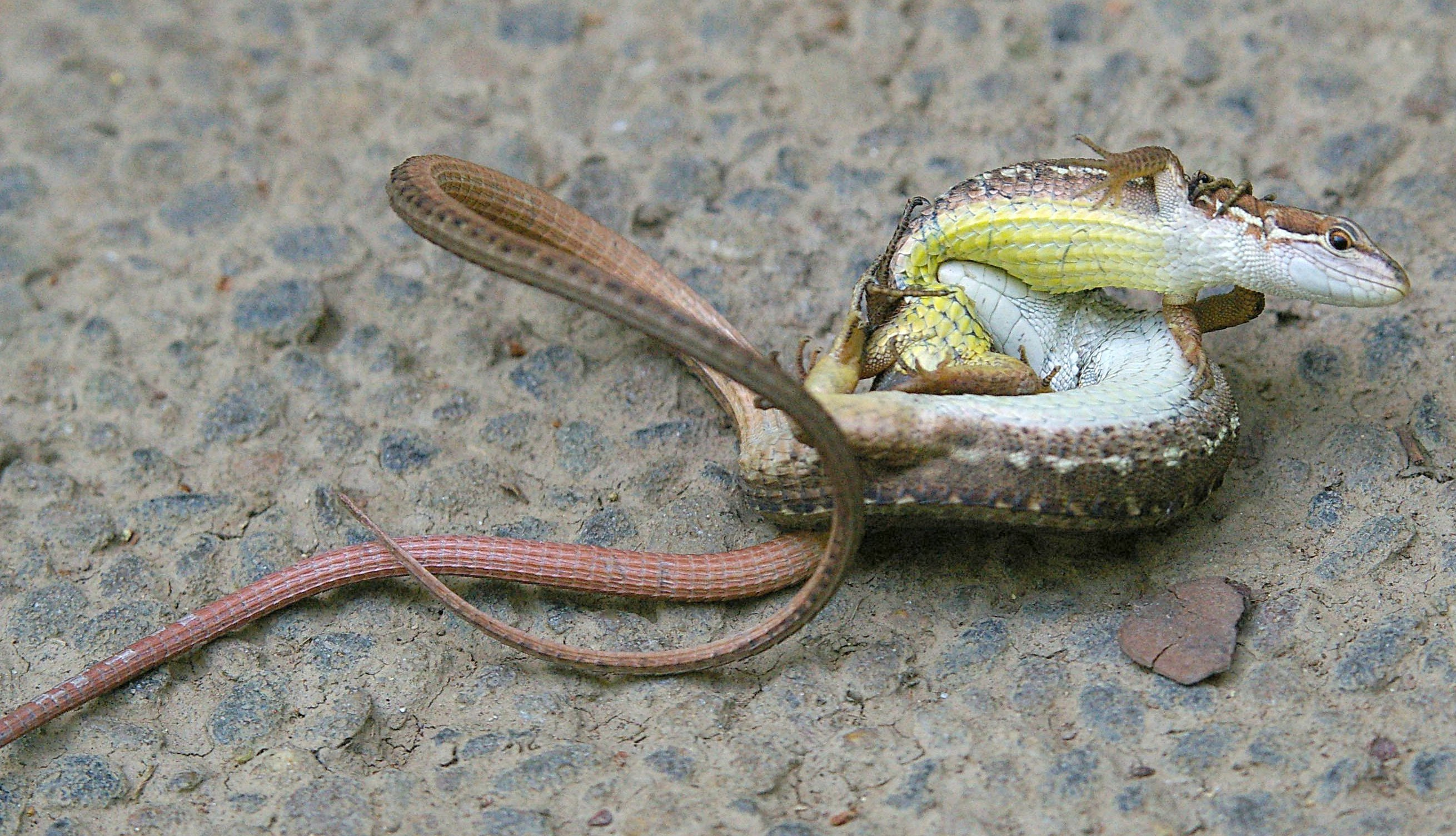
Copulation between two Japanese grass lizards

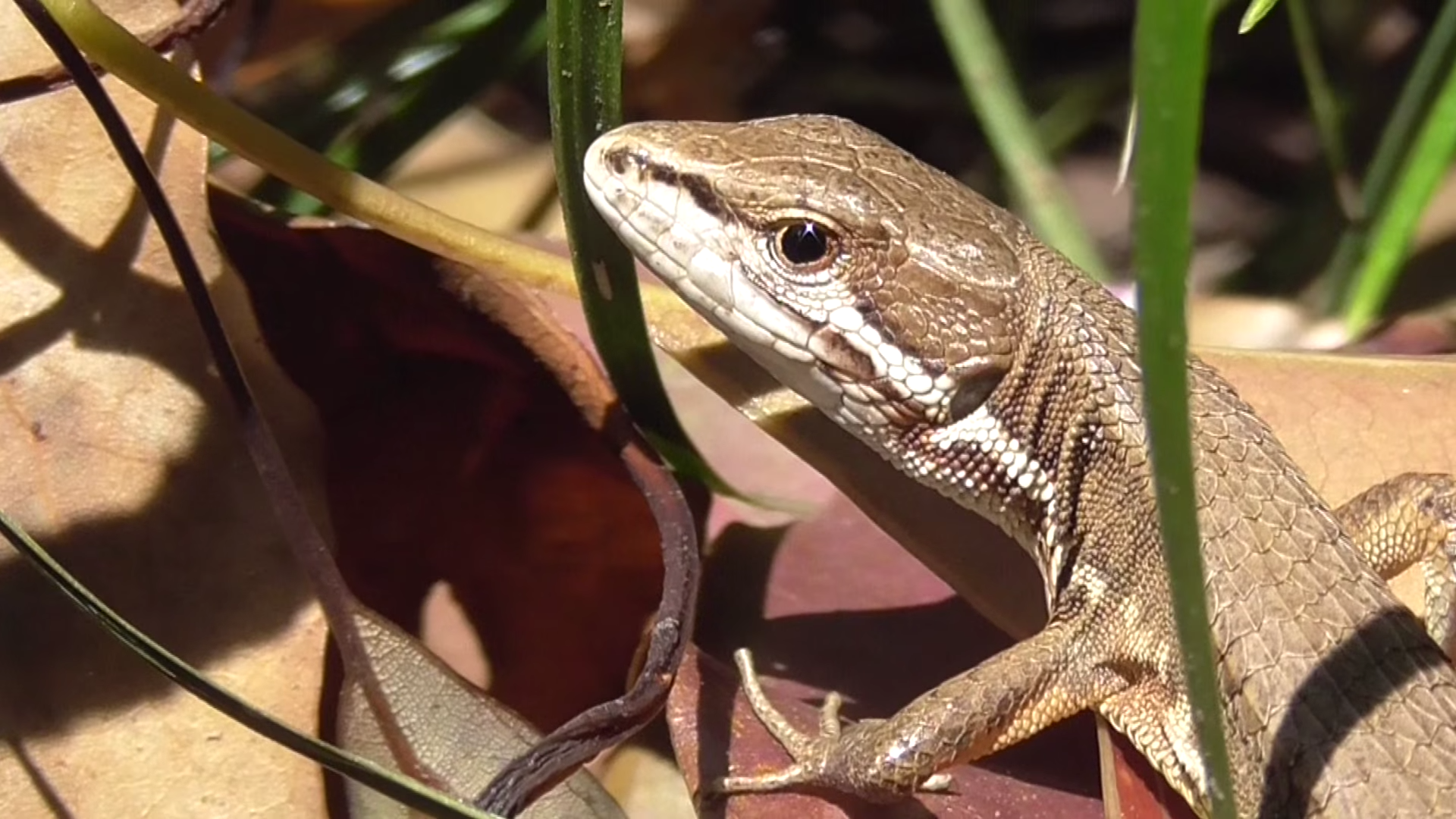
Specimen in Tokyo

== Live food ==
- Cricket
- Waxworm
- Rough woodlouse
