= Takydromus haughtonianus =

Conservation status
- Data Deficient (IUCN 3.1)

Scientific classification
- Kingdom: Animalia
- Phylum: Chordata
- Class: Reptilia
- Order: Squamata
- Family: Lacertidae
- Genus: Takydromus
- Species: T. haughtonianus

Binomial name
- Takydromus haughtonianus (Jerdon, 1870)

Synonyms
- Tachydromus [sic] haughtonianus Jerdon, 1870; Takydromus haughtonianus — M.A. Smith, 1935

Species of lizard

Takydromus haughtonianus, commonly known as the Goalpara grass lizard, is a species of lizard in the family Lacertidae. The species is endemic to India.

== Geographic range ==
T. haughtonianus is found in northeastern India in the Indian state of Assam.

The type locality is "Goalpara, Assam".

== Behavior ==
T. haughtonianus is terrestrial.

== Reproduction ==
T. haughtonianus is oviparous.
