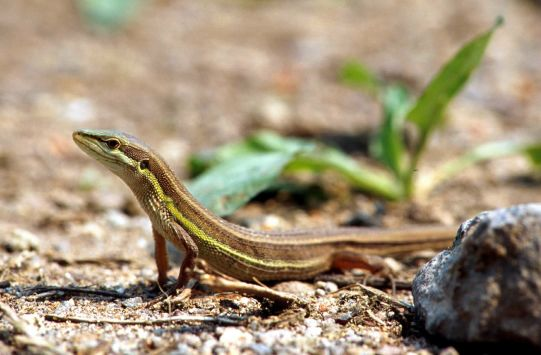

Scientific classification
- Domain: Eukaryota
- Kingdom: Animalia
- Phylum: Chordata
- Class: Reptilia
- Order: Squamata
- Family: Lacertidae
- Genus: Takydromus
- Species: T. formosanus

Binomial name
- Takydromus formosanus (Boulenger, 1894)

Synonyms
- Tachydromus formosanus Boulenger, 1894

= Takydromus formosanus =

Species of lizard

Takydromus formosanus, also known as the Formosa grass lizard, is a species of lizard endemic to Taiwan. Its body is about 6 cm long, and the total length reaches 22 cm. Its back is brown, with a yellow-green stripe on its side. It can be commonly found around the island, usually at elevations under 1500 m, living in grasses and shrubs. It is diurnal and eats small invertebrates. It is capable of caudal autotomy. The species was described by George Albert Boulenger in 1894.
