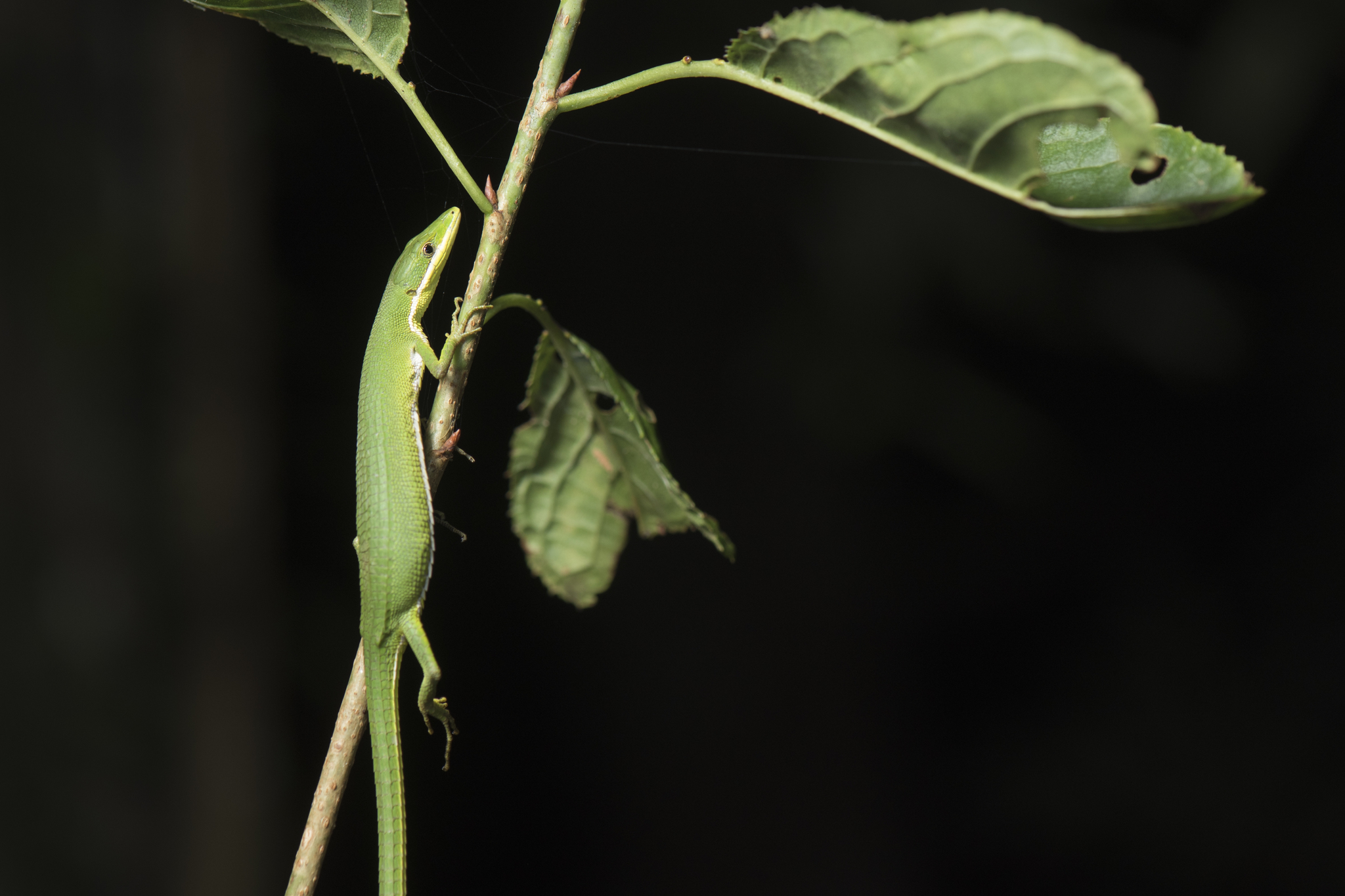

Conservation status
- Near Threatened (IUCN 3.1)

Scientific classification
- Kingdom: Animalia
- Phylum: Chordata
- Class: Reptilia
- Order: Squamata
- Family: Lacertidae
- Genus: Takydromus
- Species: T. sauteri

Binomial name
- Takydromus sauteri Van Denburgh, 1909

= Takydromus sauteri =

Species of lizard

Takydromus sauteri, known commonly as the Koshun grass lizard, is a species of lizard in the family Lacertidae. The species is found in eastern and southern Taiwan, including Orchid Island.

== Etymology ==
The specific name, sauteri, is in honor of German entomologist Hans Sauter.

== Habitat ==
The preferred natural habitat of T. sauteri is forest at altitudes of 900–1,000 m (3,000–3,300 ft), but it has also been found in gardens and on bushes near houses.

== Description ==
The dorsum of T. sauteri is bright green. The upper lip and the venter are white.

The tail is very long, 4.2 times the snout-to-vent length (SVL).

== Reproduction ==
T. sauteri is oviparous. Clutch size is 2–11 eggs, and delayed fertilization appears to exist in this species.
