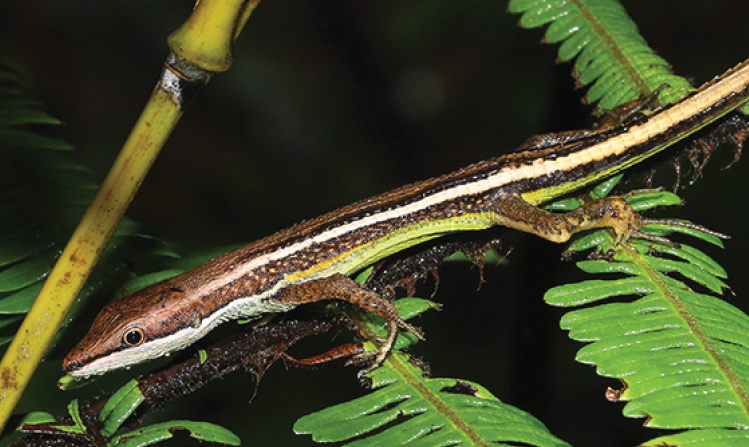

Scientific classification
- Kingdom: Animalia
- Phylum: Chordata
- Class: Reptilia
- Order: Squamata
- Family: Lacertidae
- Genus: Takydromus
- Species: T. yunkaiensis

Binomial name
- Takydromus yunkaiensis Wang, Lyu, & Wang, 2019

= Takydromus yunkaiensis =

Species of lizard

Takydromus yunkaiensis, the Yunkai grass lizard, is a species of lizard in the family Lacertidae. It is endemic to China.
