= Takydromus madaensis =

Conservation status
- Data Deficient (IUCN 3.1)

Scientific classification
- Kingdom: Animalia
- Phylum: Chordata
- Class: Reptilia
- Order: Squamata
- Family: Lacertidae
- Genus: Takydromus
- Species: T. madaensis

Binomial name
- Takydromus madaensis Bobrov, 2013

Species of lizard

Takydromus madaensis, the Ma Da grass lizard , is a species of lizard in the family Lacertidae. It is endemic to Vietnam.
