= Takydromus sikkimensis =

Scientific classification
- Kingdom: Animalia
- Phylum: Chordata
- Class: Reptilia
- Order: Squamata
- Family: Lacertidae
- Genus: Takydromus
- Species: T. sikkimensis

Binomial name
- Takydromus sikkimensis Günther, 1888

Species of lizard

Takydromus sikkimensis, the Sikkim grass lizard, is a species of lizard in the family Lacertidae. It is endemic to India.

== Distribution ==
This species is endemic to Sikkim in India.

== Etymology ==
Its species name, composed of Sikkim and the Latin suffix -ensis, "that which lives in, that which inhabits", was given in reference to the place of its discovery.
