= Takydromus toyamai =

Conservation status
- Endangered (IUCN 3.1)

Scientific classification
- Kingdom: Animalia
- Phylum: Chordata
- Class: Reptilia
- Order: Squamata
- Family: Lacertidae
- Genus: Takydromus
- Species: T. toyamai

Binomial name
- Takydromus toyamai Takeda & Ota, 1996

Species of lizard

Takydromus toyamai (ミヤコカナヘビ), also known commonly as the Miyako grass lizard, is a species of lizard in the family Lacertidae. The species is endemic to the Ryukyu Islands.

== Etymology ==
The specific name, toyamai, is in honor of Japanese herpetologist Masanao Toyama.

== Description ==
T. toyamai rarely exceeds 10 in (25 cm) in total length, most of which is tail. It is usually green, while some juveniles can be brown.

== Behavior and diet ==
T. toyamai is an active lizard, coming out during the day to forage for small insects.

== Reproduction ==
T. toyami is oviparous.

== Geographic range ==
T. toyamai is found in the Miyako Islands in the southern Ryukyu Islands.

== Habitat ==
The preferred natural habitats of T. toyamai are grassland, shrubland, and forest.

== Conservation status ==
T. toyamai is listed as endangered by the IUCN due to deforestation, and the introduction of peacocks and weasels.

== In captivity ==
If kept as a pet, the Miyako grass lizard likes the temperature to be around 80–90 °F (27–32 °C) during the day, and 60–75 °F (16–24 °C) degrees at night. It prefers the humidity to be around 78%.
