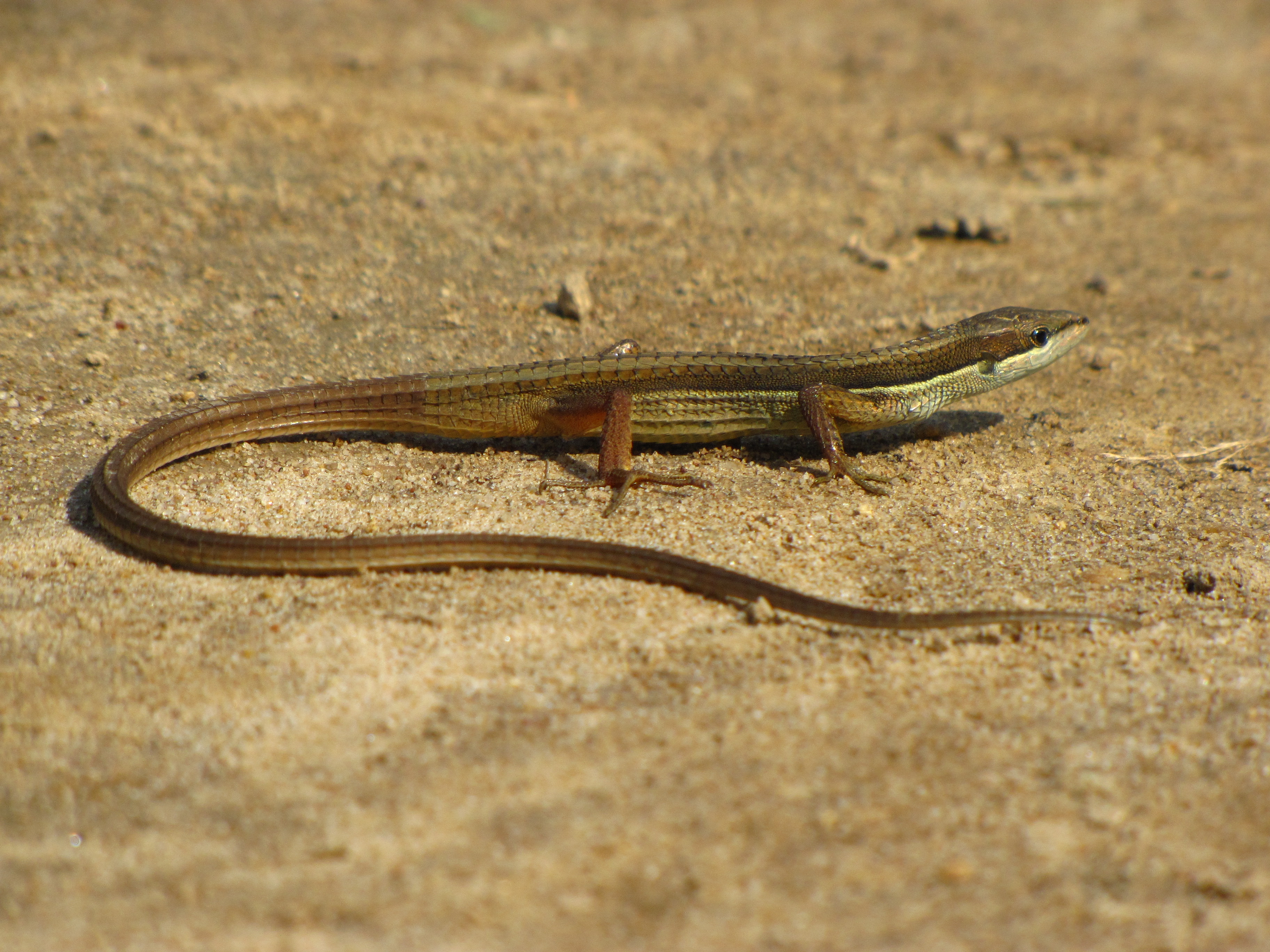

Scientific classification
- Kingdom: Animalia
- Phylum: Chordata
- Class: Reptilia
- Order: Squamata
- Family: Lacertidae
- Genus: Takydromus
- Species: T. khasiensis

Binomial name
- Takydromus khasiensis Boulenger, 1917

Synonyms
- Tachydromus khasiensis Boulenger, 1917

= Takydromus khasiensis =

Species of lizard

Takydromus khasiensis (common names: Java grass lizard, Khasi Hills long-tailed lizard) is a species of lizard. It is found in Northeast India (Assam, Meghalaya), adjacent Myanmar (Burma), and northern part of Bangladesh. The type locality is the Khasi Hills.

The type series consists of three males and two females measuring respectively 44–48 mm (1.7–1.9 in) and 51–53 mm (2.0–2.1 in) in snout–vent length.
