= Takydromus albomaculosus =

Scientific classification
- Kingdom: Animalia
- Phylum: Chordata
- Class: Reptilia
- Order: Squamata
- Family: Lacertidae
- Genus: Takydromus
- Species: T. albomaculosus

Binomial name
- Takydromus albomaculosus Wang, Gong, Liu, & Wang, 2017

Species of lizard

Takydromus albomaculosus is a species of lizard in the family Lacertidae. It is endemic to China.
