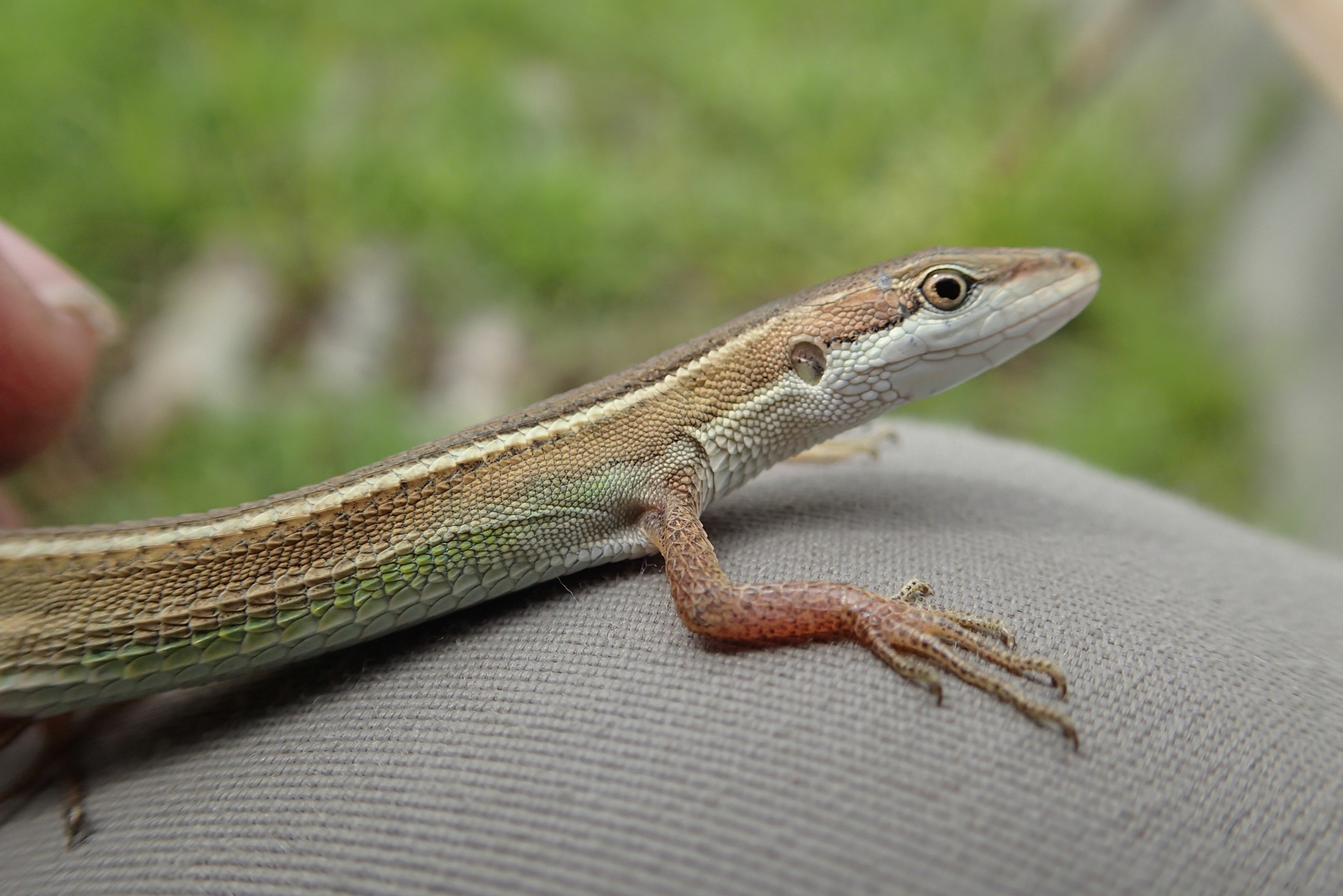

Conservation status
- Least Concern (IUCN 3.1)

Scientific classification
- Kingdom: Animalia
- Phylum: Chordata
- Class: Reptilia
- Order: Squamata
- Family: Lacertidae
- Genus: Takydromus
- Species: T. stejnegeri

Binomial name
- Takydromus stejnegeri Van Denburgh, 1912

= Takydromus stejnegeri =

Species of lizard

Takydromus stejnegeri is a species of lizard in the family Lacertidae. The species is endemic to Taiwan.

== Etymology ==
The specific name, stejnegeri, is in honor of Norwegian-American herpetologist Leonhard Stejneger.

== Habitat ==
The preferred natural habitats of T. stejnegeri are grassland and rocky areas, at altitudes from sea level to 1,000 m (3,300 ft).

== Description ==
The holotype of T. stejnegeri has a snout-to-vent length of 5.1 cm (2.0 in), and the tail is 18.4 cm (7.2 in) long.

== Reproduction ==
T. stejnegeri is oviparous.
