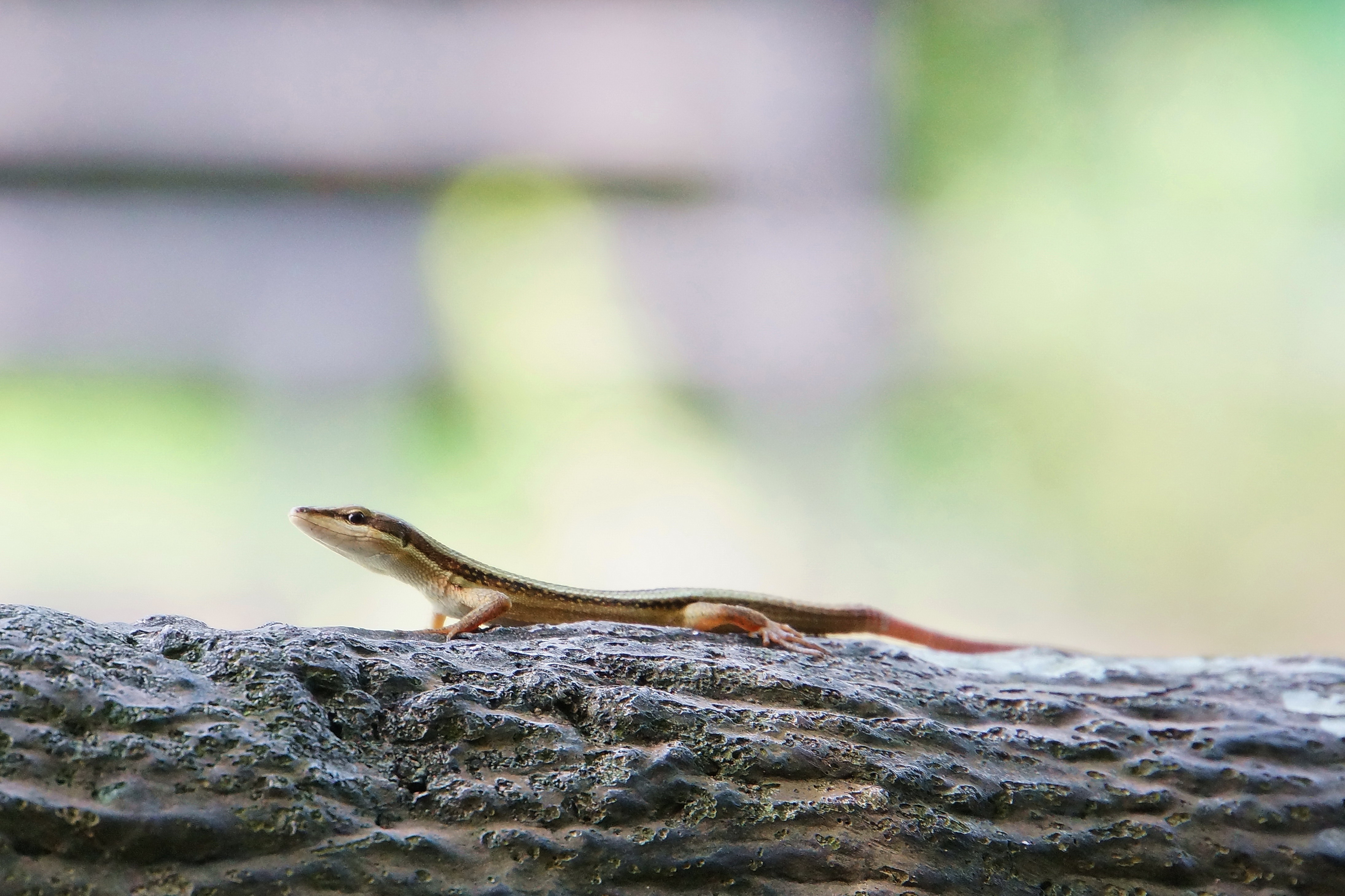

Conservation status
- Least Concern (IUCN 3.1)

Scientific classification
- Kingdom: Animalia
- Phylum: Chordata
- Class: Reptilia
- Order: Squamata
- Family: Lacertidae
- Genus: Takydromus
- Species: T. kuehnei

Binomial name
- Takydromus kuehnei Van Denburgh, 1909

Synonyms
- Platyplacopus kuehnei (Van Denburgh, 1909); Takydromus chinensis T. Vogt, 1914

= Takydromus kuehnei =

Species of lizard

Takydromus kuehnei is a species of lizard in the family Lacertidae. The species is native to Southeast Asia. There are two recognized subspecies.

== Etymology ==
The specific name, kuehnei, is in honor of American herpetologist Joseph Cheesman Thompson, who as a spy in Japan (1909–1911) used the nom de guerre Victor Kühne.

== Geographic range ==
T. kuehnei is found in southeastern China, Taiwan, and northern Vietnam.

== Description ==
Dorsally, T. kuehnei is olive or olive brown. Ventrally it is white. It has inguinal pores, 4–5 on each side.

== Habitat ==
The preferred natural habitat of T. kuehnei is forest, at altitudes from sea level to 1,110 m (3,640 ft).

== Behavior ==
T. kuehnei is terrestrial and diurnal.

== Reproduction ==
T. kuehnei is oviparous. Clutch size is one or two eggs, and a female may lay as many as four clutches in a year.

== Subspecies ==
Two subspecies are recognized as being valid, including the nominotypical subspecies.

- Takydromus kuehnei kuehnei Van Denburgh, 1909
- Takydromus kuehnei vietnamensis Ziegler & Bischoff, 1999
