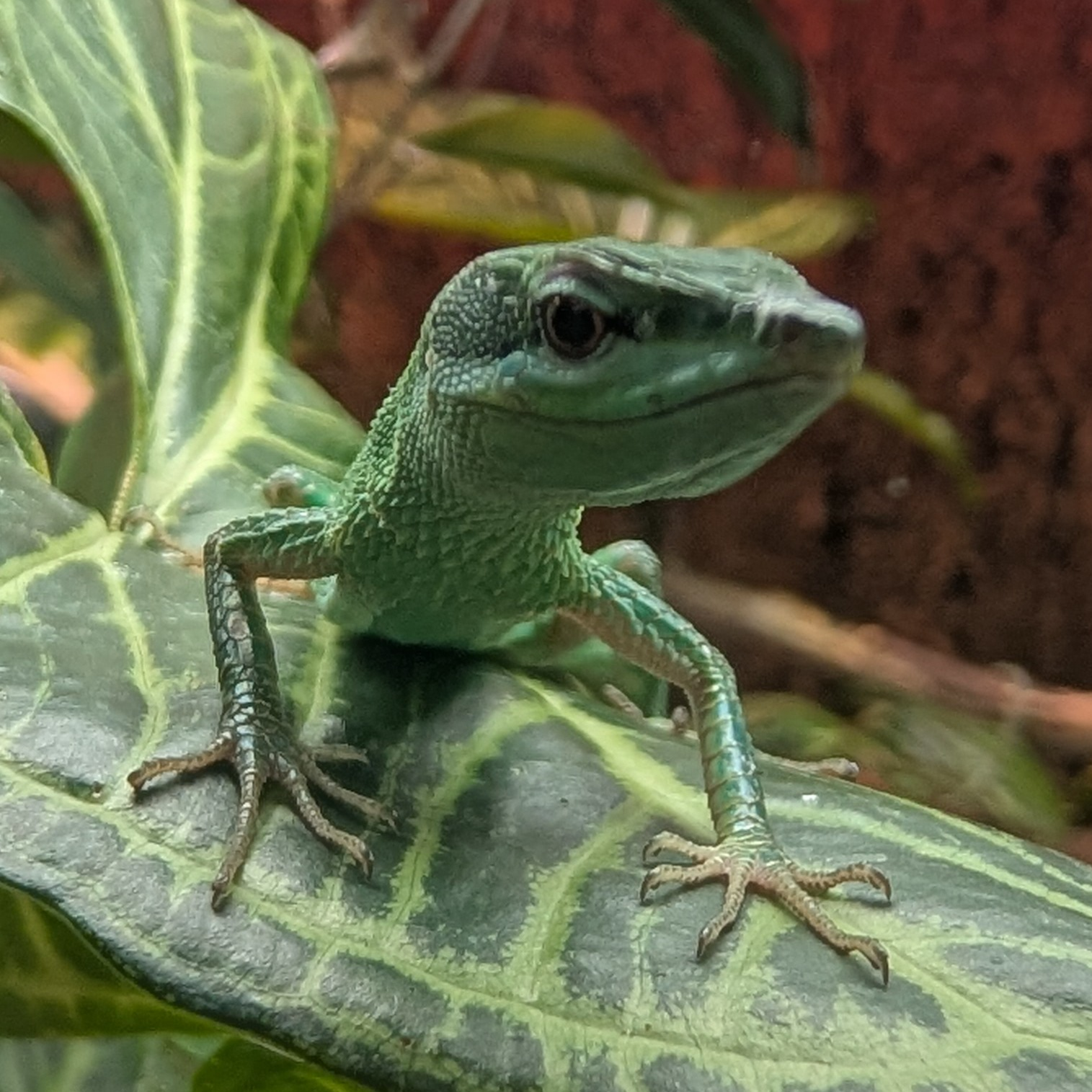

Conservation status
- Endangered (IUCN 3.1)

Scientific classification
- Kingdom: Animalia
- Phylum: Chordata
- Class: Reptilia
- Order: Squamata
- Suborder: Lacertoidea
- Family: Lacertidae
- Genus: Takydromus
- Species: T. dorsalis

Binomial name
- Takydromus dorsalis Stejneger, 1904

= Takydromus dorsalis =

Species of lizard

Takydromus dorsalis, the Sakishima grass lizard, is a species of lizard in the family Lacertidae. It is endemic to the Yaeyama Islands (Ishigaki Island, Iriomote Island, Kohama Island and Kuroshima) in southern Japan.

== Etymology ==
The name "Takydromus" means "fast-running", derived from greek. "Dorsalis" was inspired by its small, differently arranged dorsal scales that distinguish it from other species.

== Activity ==
It is diurnal. The females lay clutches of one to two eggs.

== Threats ==
The IUCN lists the species as endangered. Threats consist of habitat degradation and invasive peacocks.

== Gallery ==
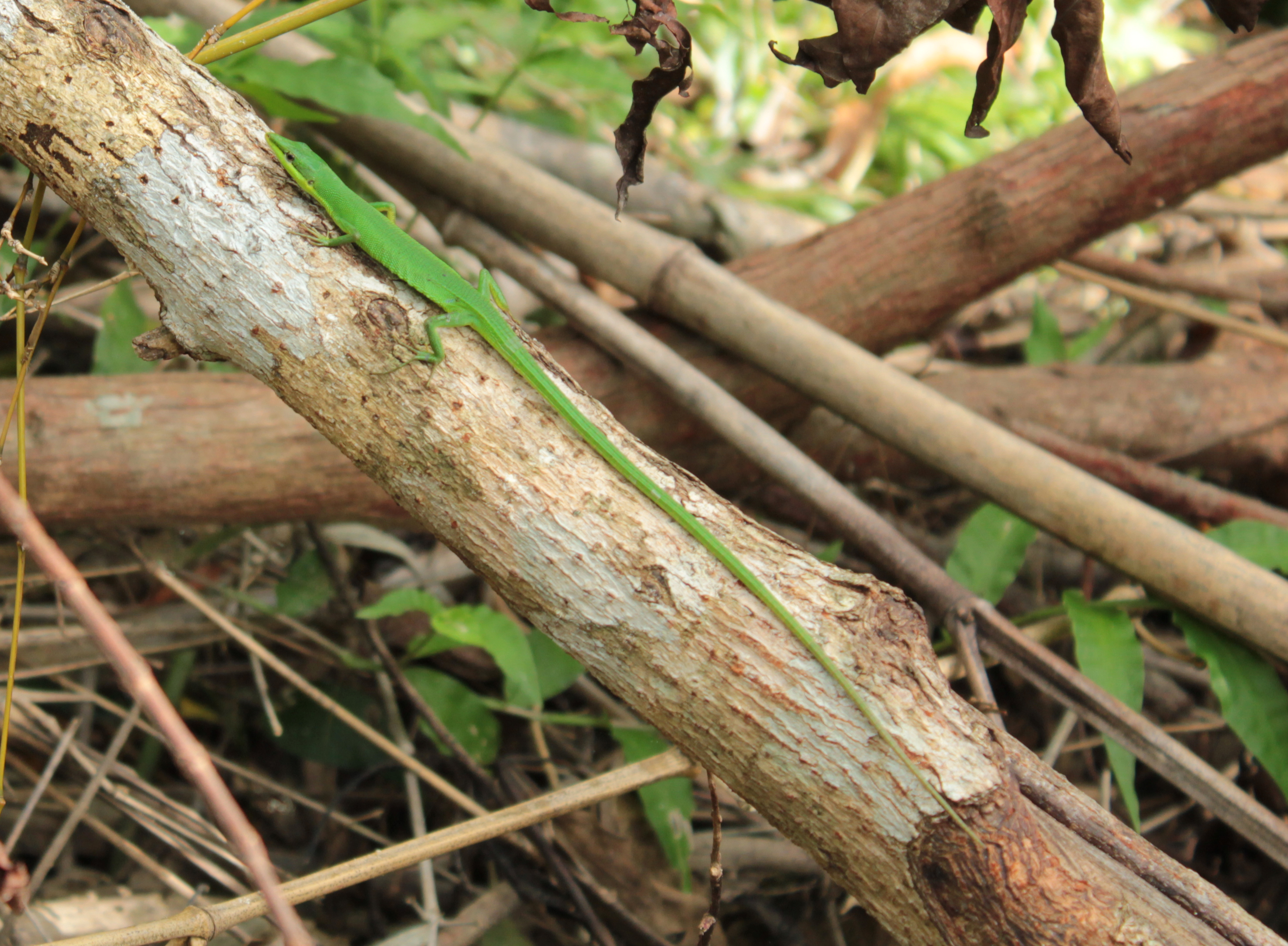
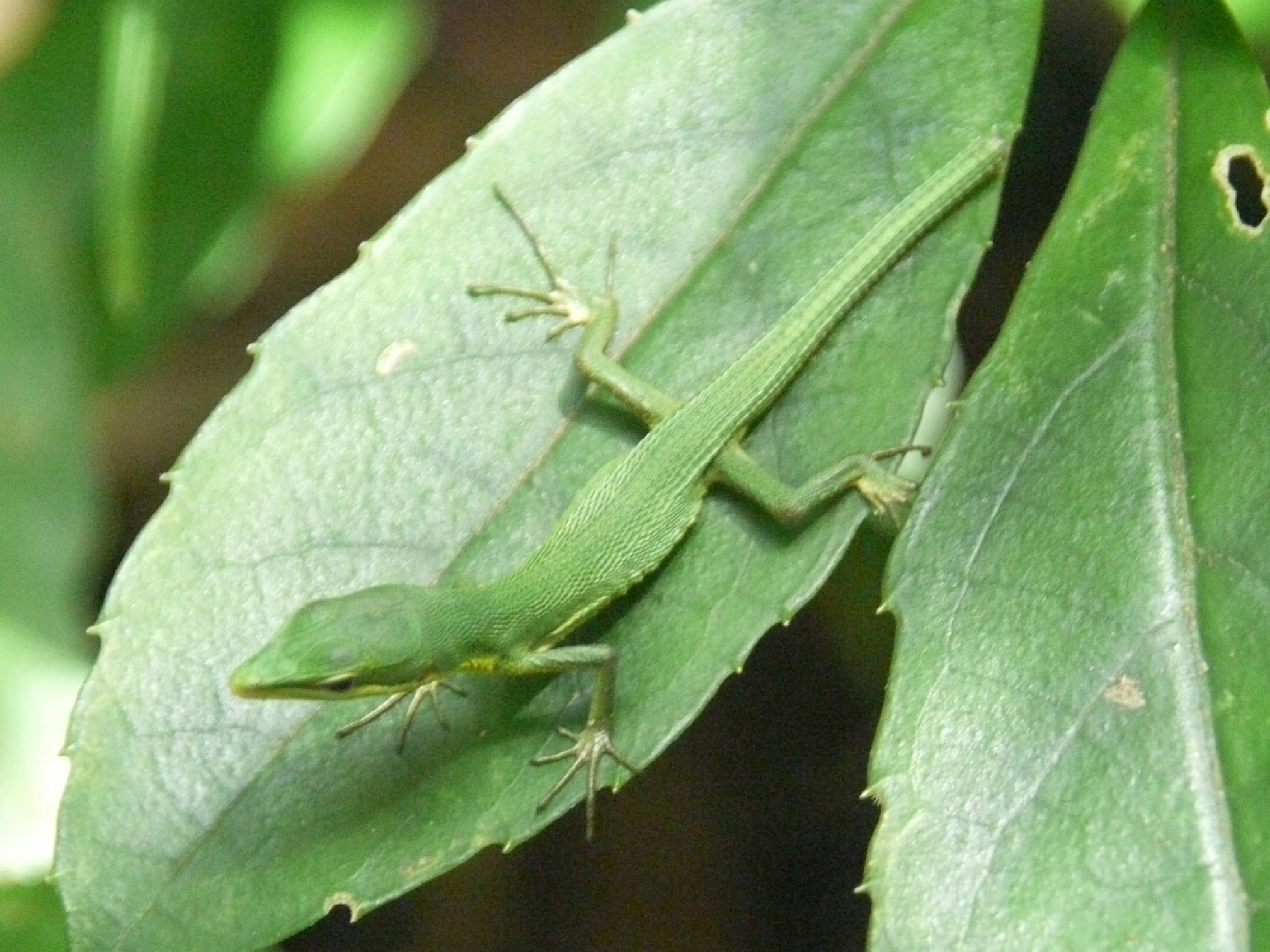
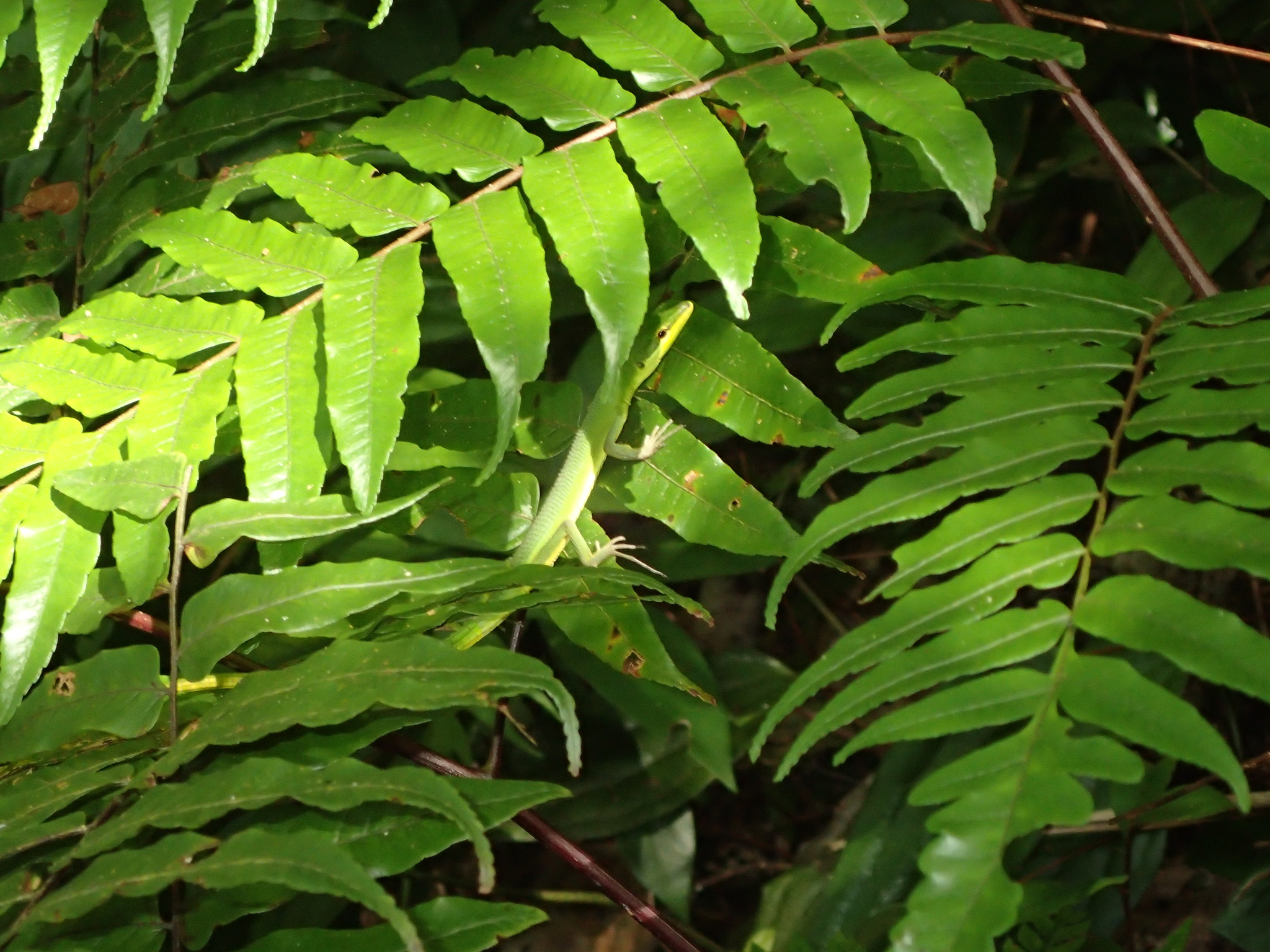
Takydromus dorsalis
