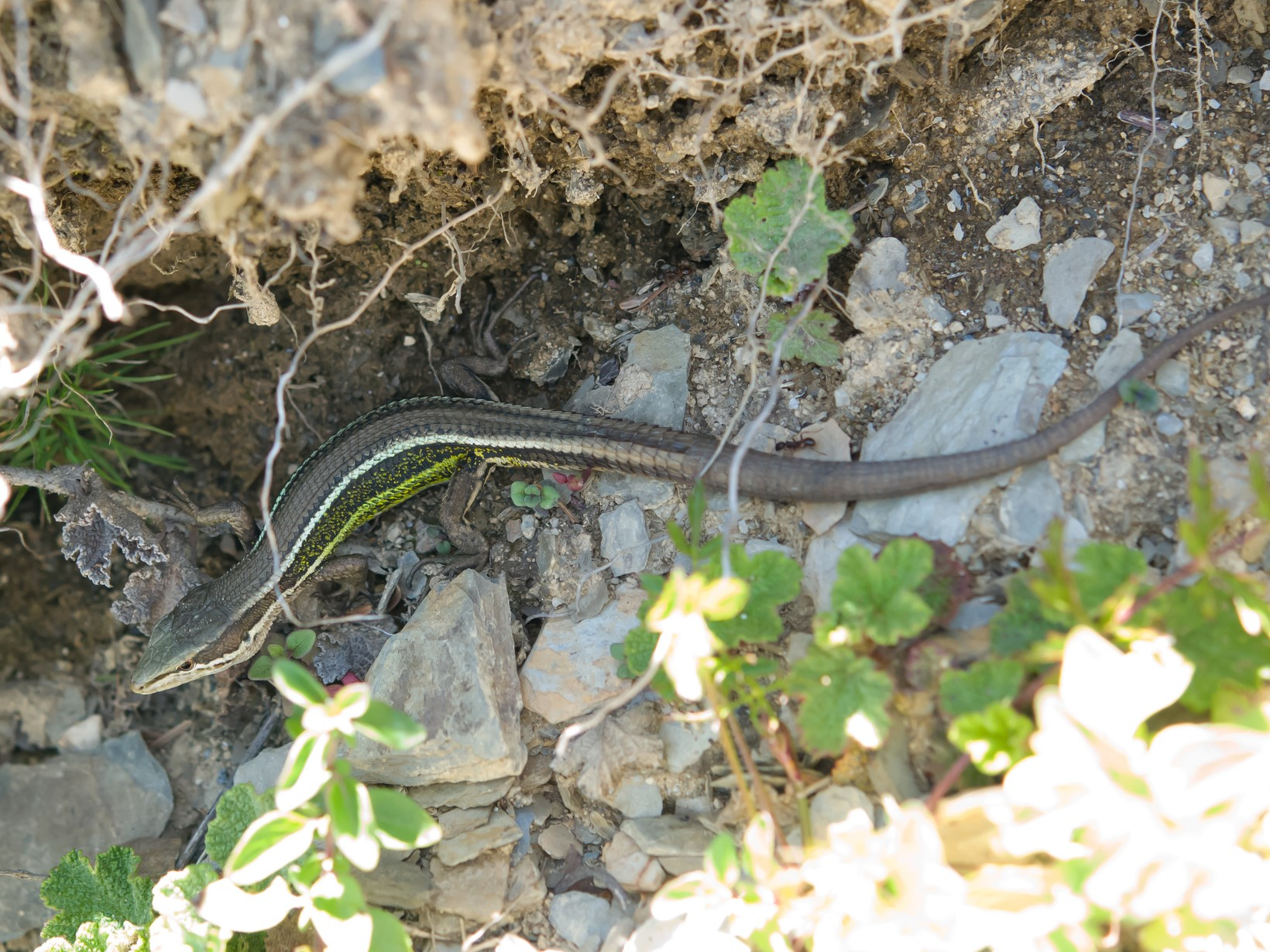

Scientific classification
- Domain: Eukaryota
- Kingdom: Animalia
- Phylum: Chordata
- Class: Reptilia
- Order: Squamata
- Family: Lacertidae
- Genus: Takydromus
- Species: T. hsuehshanensis

Binomial name
- Takydromus hsuehshanensis Lin & Cheng, 1981

= Takydromus hsuehshanensis =

Species of lizard

Takydromus hsuehshanensis is a species of lizard in the family Lacertidae. It is endemic to Taiwan.
