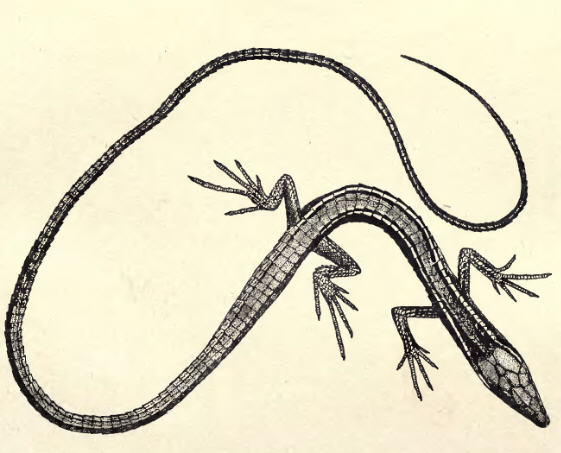

Conservation status
- Least Concern (IUCN 3.1)

Scientific classification
- Kingdom: Animalia
- Phylum: Chordata
- Class: Reptilia
- Order: Squamata
- Family: Lacertidae
- Genus: Takydromus
- Species: T. sexlineatus

Binomial name
- Takydromus sexlineatus Daudin, 1802

= Takydromus sexlineatus =

Species of lizard

Takydromus sexlineatus, the Asian grass lizard, six-striped long-tailed grass lizard, or long-tailed grass lizard, is an arboreal, diurnal species of lizard. The tail length is usually over three times the body (snout to vent) length in this species.

Males and females are similar, males being distinguishable by the presence of pre-anal pores. On average they grow to around 12 cm (4.7 in) snout-to-vent length, with the addition of a distinctive, prehensile long tail. Some individuals may have small circular spots on the sides of the bodies. This species of lizard is often kept as a pet.

Like many lizards, they can drop their tail and grow a new one when attacked.

== Appearance ==
The long-tailed grass lizard is easily identifiable by its long tail, and has a white to cream coloured underbelly with a brown, green or beige back, often adorned with brown stripes of different shades. It typically has a small head with a sharply pointed snout and a black or pink tongue. Its body is slightly elongated and thin, with small, pointy scales beneath the chin, resembling a beard. Males have white spots on their sides, while females do not. Males have tails that thicken past the vent and are generally thicker than the female's down the entire length of the tail. The light stripes on the length of the body are yellower than the female's, which are more cream coloured. They grow up to 12 inches (30 cm.) long, with the tail usually being three times their body length.

== Distribution ==
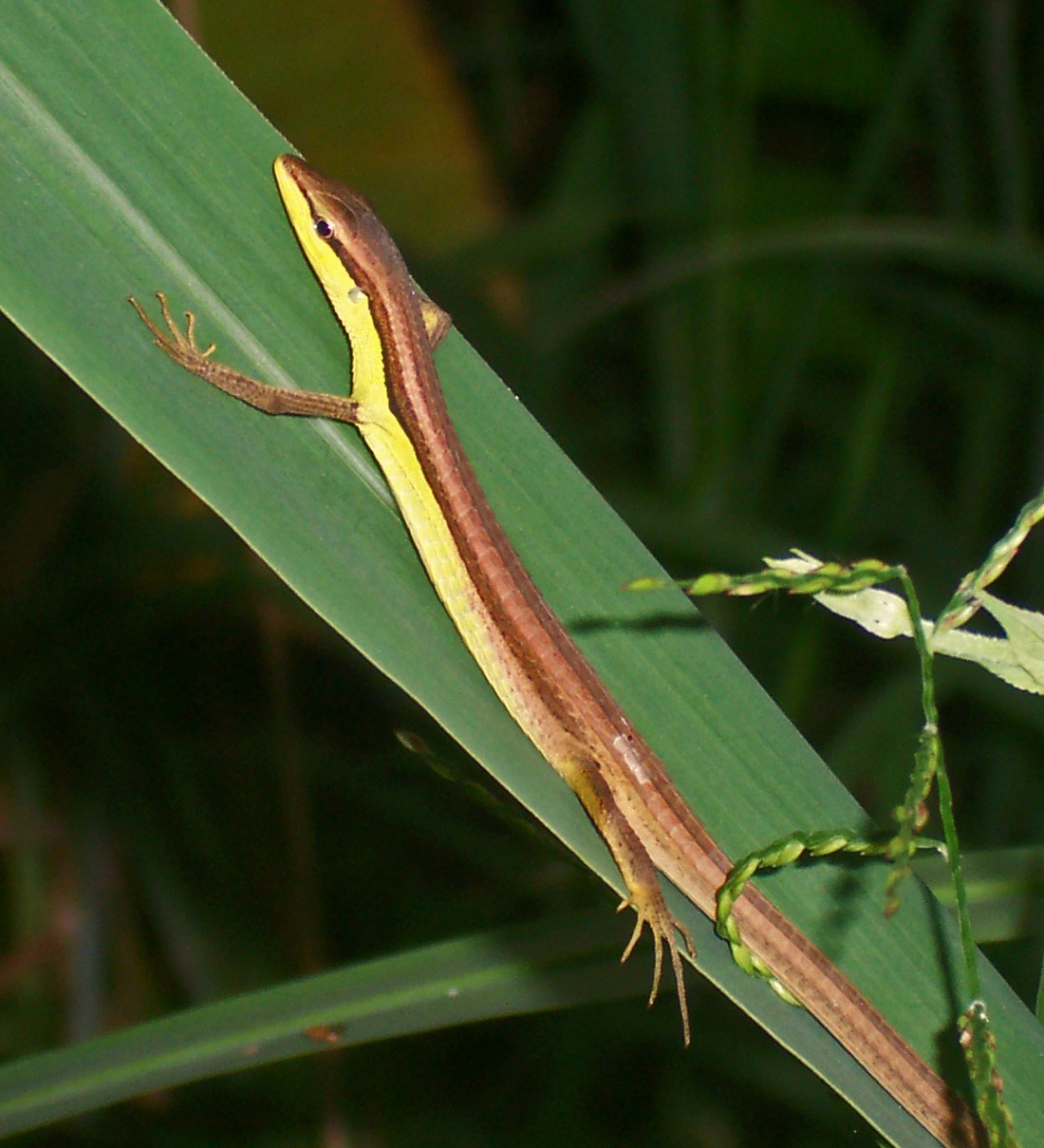
From Bogor, West Java

Takydromus sexlineatus is found throughout Southeast Asia, and is native to a number of countries including India, China, Thailand, and Indonesia. The subspecies ocellatus is found in areas such as southern China, north Burma and north Malaysia.

== Behavior ==
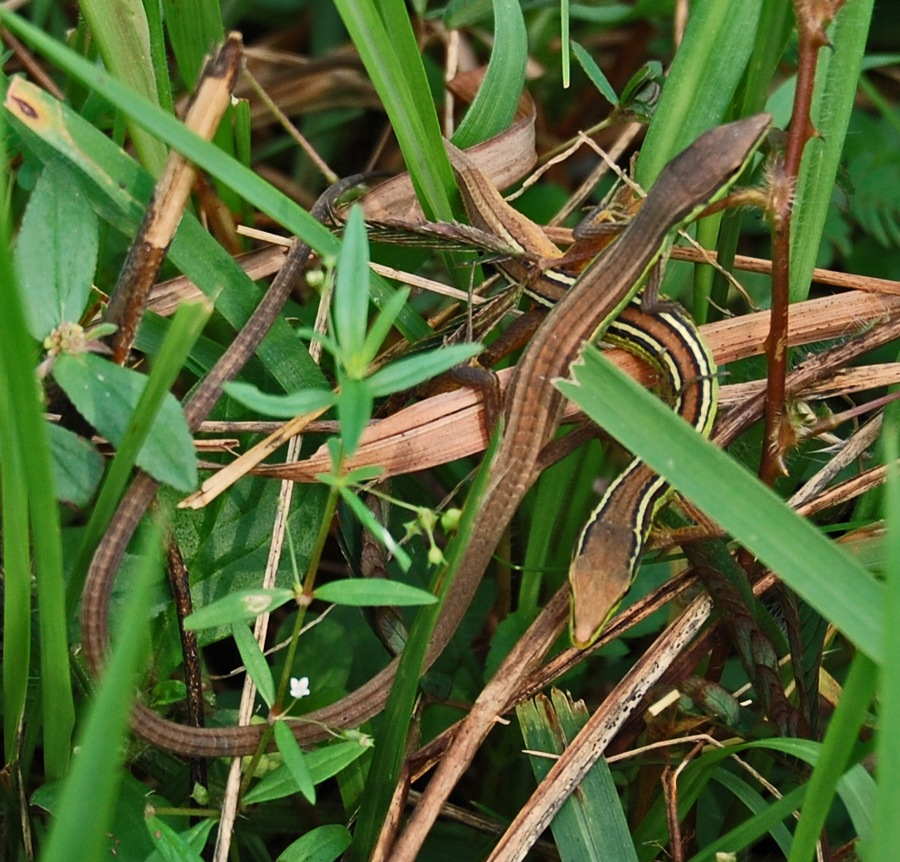
In a pair

These are entirely diurnal lizards that emerge in the early morning to bask in the sun. If a potential predator approaches, they will first remain completely still; then, if the danger persists, they will flee to the safety of the foliage. Both sexes use arm-waving gestures (similar to a front crawl swimming action), apparently to communicate with each other. They are very agile and fast.

== Diet ==
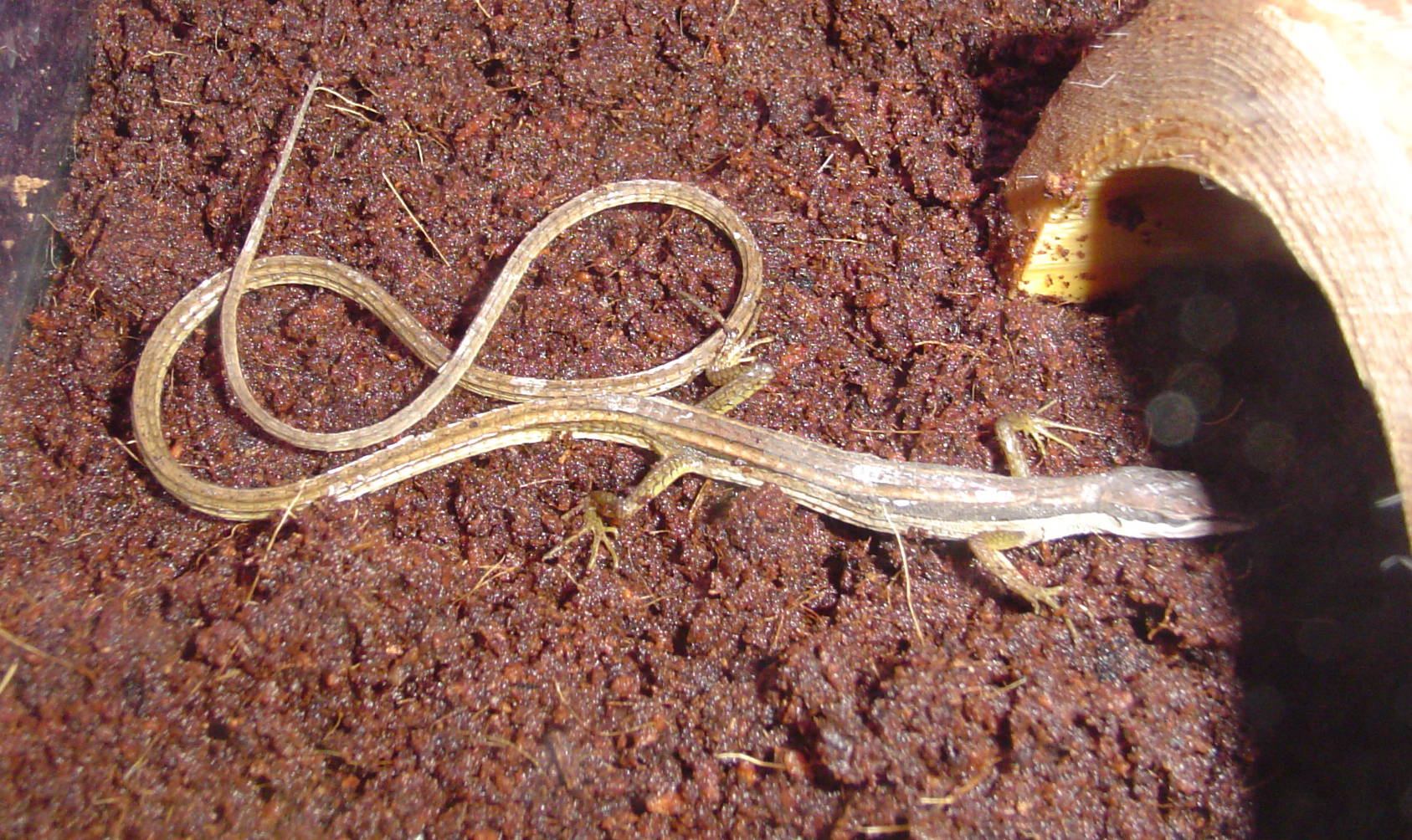
in captivity

Takydromus sexlineatus feeds on small insects such as flies. In captivity, they can be reared on crickets and, like other small lizards, may require a calcium substitute. It is advisable in captivity to vary food including mealworms, sterile maggots or waxworms in addition to crickets. Unlike some larger reptiles, these lizards have extremely fast reactions and have been observed jumping into the air to catch flying prey such as flies.
