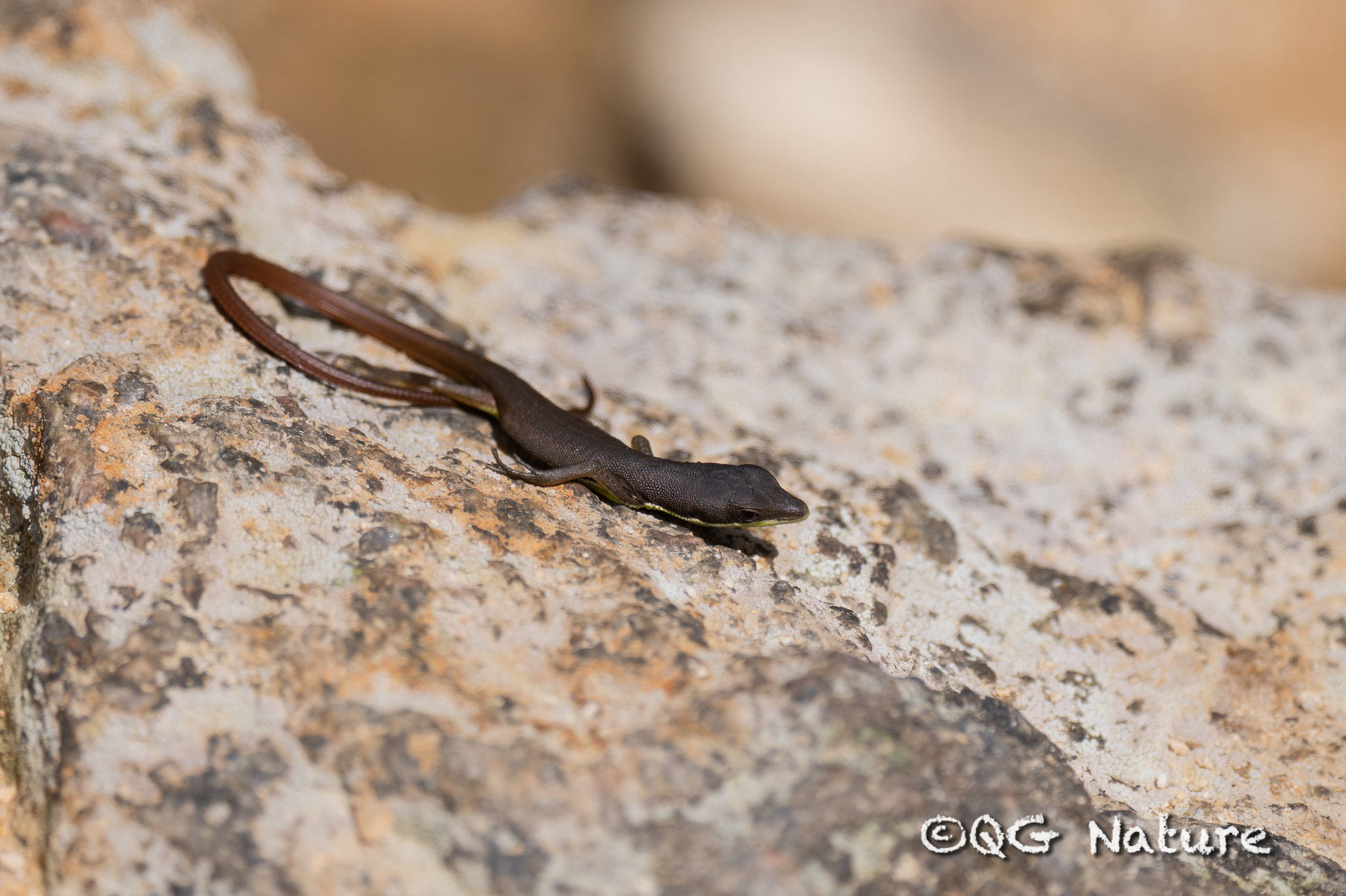

Scientific classification
- Kingdom: Animalia
- Phylum: Chordata
- Class: Reptilia
- Order: Squamata
- Family: Lacertidae
- Genus: Takydromus
- Species: T. sylvaticus

Binomial name
- Takydromus sylvaticus (Pope, 1928)

= Takydromus sylvaticus =

Species of lizard

Takydromus sylvaticus, the Chung-an ground lizard, is a species of lizard in the family Lacertidae. It is endemic to China.
