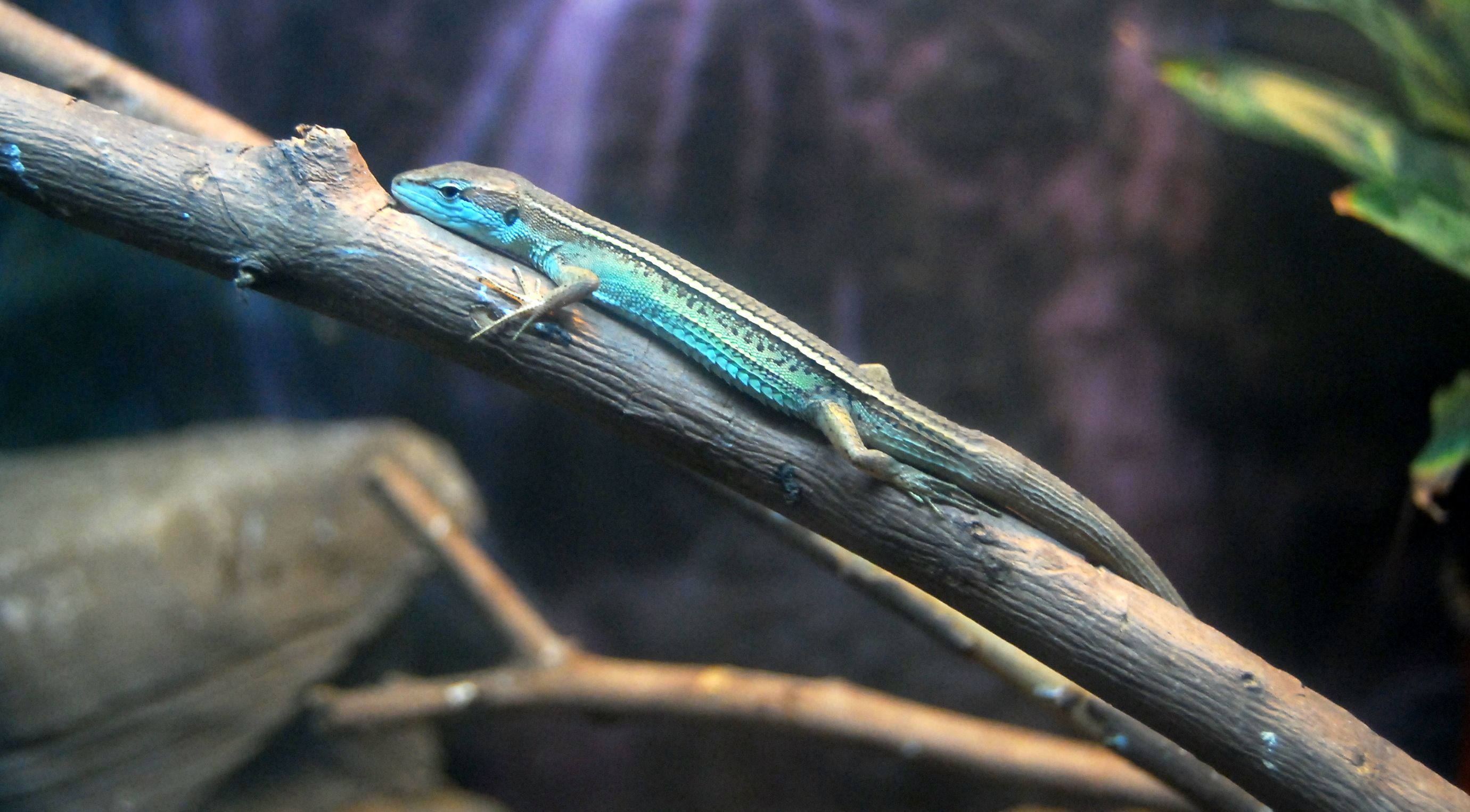

Scientific classification
- Kingdom: Animalia
- Phylum: Chordata
- Class: Reptilia
- Order: Squamata
- Family: Lacertidae
- Genus: Takydromus
- Species: T. septentrionalis

Binomial name
- Takydromus septentrionalis Günther, 1864

= Takydromus septentrionalis =

Species of lizard

Takydromus septentrionalis, the China grass lizard, is a species of lizard in the family Lacertidae. It is endemic to China.
