= Daqingshui Tunnel =

Highway tunnel in Hualien County, Taiwan

Coordinates: 24.2142°N 121.6850°E

Daqingshui Tunnel 大清水隧道
Overview
- Location: Hualien County
- Status: Enabled
- Crosses: Central Mountain Range

Operation
- Opened: November 2, 1990; 34 years ago
- Owner: Ministry of Transportation and Communications
- Operator: Ministry of Transportation and Communications
- Traffic: Car, Motorcycle, Bicycle, Pedestrian

Technical
- Operating speed: 40km/h (speed limit)

The Dachinshui Tunnel is a highway tunnel in Hualien County, Taiwan, located on the Su-Hua Highway of Provincial Highway 9, with its north entrance connecting to the Xiaqingshui Bridge and its south entrance connecting to the 13th Tunnel (North of the Jinwen Tunnel) in the form of an open-cut tunnel.

== History ==
The tunnel was constructed on April 12, 1988 (77th year of the Republic of China) and completed on November 2, 1990 (79th year of the Republic of China). It has a length of 521 meters. After its completion, vehicles no longer need to traverse the outer section of the Qingshui Cliffs.

On the night of January 11, 2023, at 11:55 P.M., due to previous seismic loosening and rainfall, the upper slope of the tunnel at the south entrance of the Dachinshui Tunnel at kilometer 159+300 of Provincial Highway 9 collapsed. Fractured rock blocks fell from a height of over 30 meters, with an impact momentum exceeding the tolerance of the tunnel, crushing a 17-meter-long concrete tunnel and an 8-meter-long steel-structured tunnel, causing a total damage length of about 25 meters and an estimated collapse volume of about 1200 cubic meters, resulting in the destruction of the tunnel and road obstruction, rendering it impassable in both directions. In the subsequent long-term plan, this section has been included in the Suhua Safety Plan. A tunnel of approximately 10 kilometers is planned to be expedited, and the comprehensive planning has been completed and submitted for departmental review, with an environmental impact assessment scheduled to be submitted to the Environmental Protection Agency by the end of the year.

On April 3, 2024, during the Hualien earthquake, the Xiaqingshui Bridge at the north entrance of the tunnel was damaged by falling rocks, resulting in the complete closure of the Su-Hua Highway.

== See also ==
- Qingshui Cliff
