= Takydromus intermedius =

Scientific classification
- Kingdom: Animalia
- Phylum: Chordata
- Class: Reptilia
- Order: Squamata
- Family: Lacertidae
- Genus: Takydromus
- Species: T. intermedius

Binomial name
- Takydromus intermedius Stejneger, 1924

Species of lizard

Takydromus intermedius is a species of lizard belonging to the Lacertidae family. It is endemic to China.
