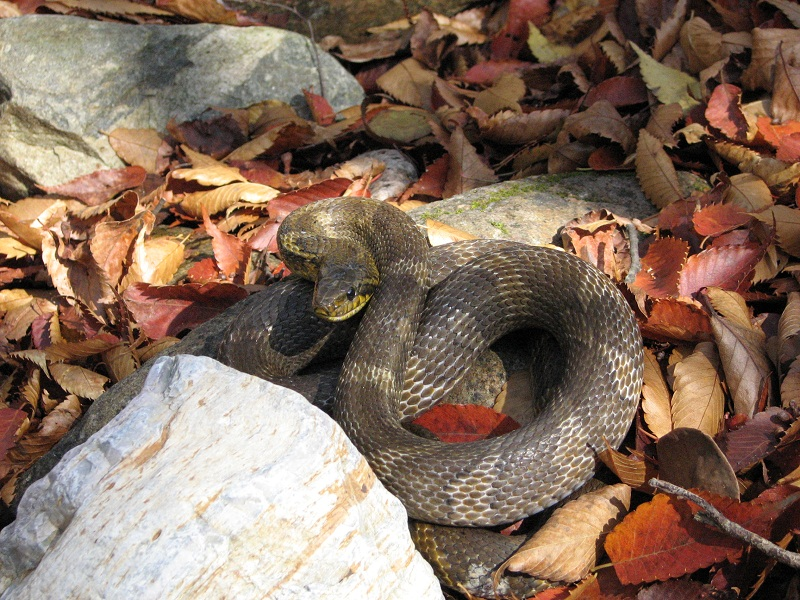

Conservation status
- Least Concern (IUCN 3.1)

Scientific classification
- Kingdom: Animalia
- Phylum: Chordata
- Class: Reptilia
- Order: Squamata
- Suborder: Serpentes
- Family: Colubridae
- Genus: Elaphe
- Species: E. anomala

Binomial name
- Elaphe anomala (Boulenger, 1916)

Synonyms
- Coluber anomalus Boulenger, 1916

= Elaphe anomala =

Species of snake

Elaphe anomala, commonly known as the Korean rat snake, southern Amur ratsnake, or as gureong-i (구렁이) in the Korean language, is a non-venomous species of colubrid snake known from China and Korea. It was formerly considered to be a subspecies of Elaphe schrenckii, the Amur ratsnake. It is a semi-arboreal snake that can be found in grasslands, dry scrub, rocky areas, and on the banks of rivers and lakes. It grows to 150–180 cm (59–71 in).
