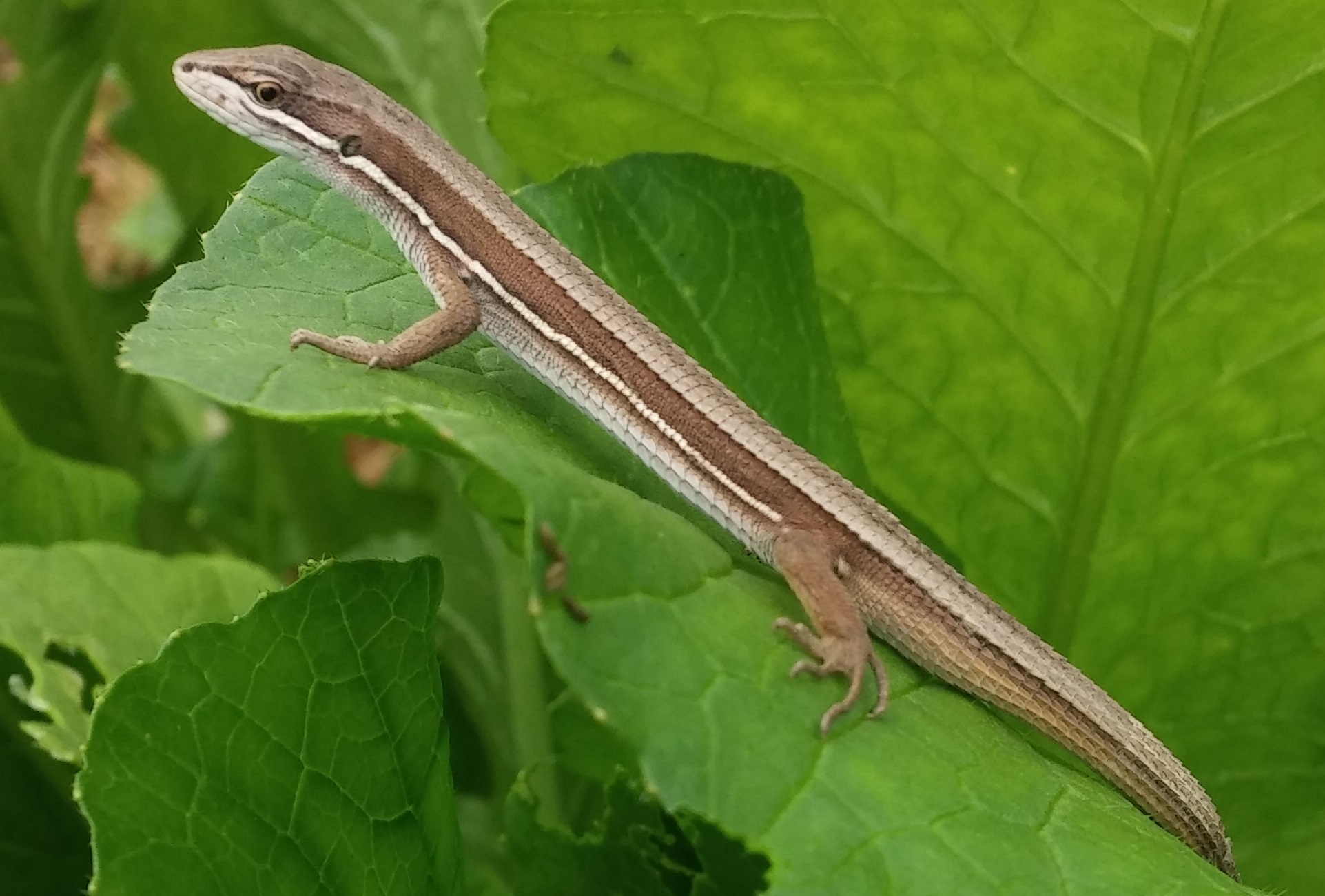

Conservation status
- Least Concern (IUCN 3.1)

Scientific classification
- Kingdom: Animalia
- Phylum: Chordata
- Class: Reptilia
- Order: Squamata
- Family: Lacertidae
- Genus: Takydromus
- Species: T. wolteri

Binomial name
- Takydromus wolteri Fischer, 1885

= Takydromus wolteri =

Species of lizard

Takydromus wolteri, also known commonly as the mountain grass lizard, is a species of lizard in the family Lacertidae. The species is native to East Asia.

== Etymology ==
The specific name, wolteri, is in honor of German amateur naturalist Karl Andreas Wolter, who collected the holotype.

== Geographic range ==
T. wolteri is found in eastern China, Korea, and eastern Russia.

== Reproduction ==
T. wolteri is oviparous.
