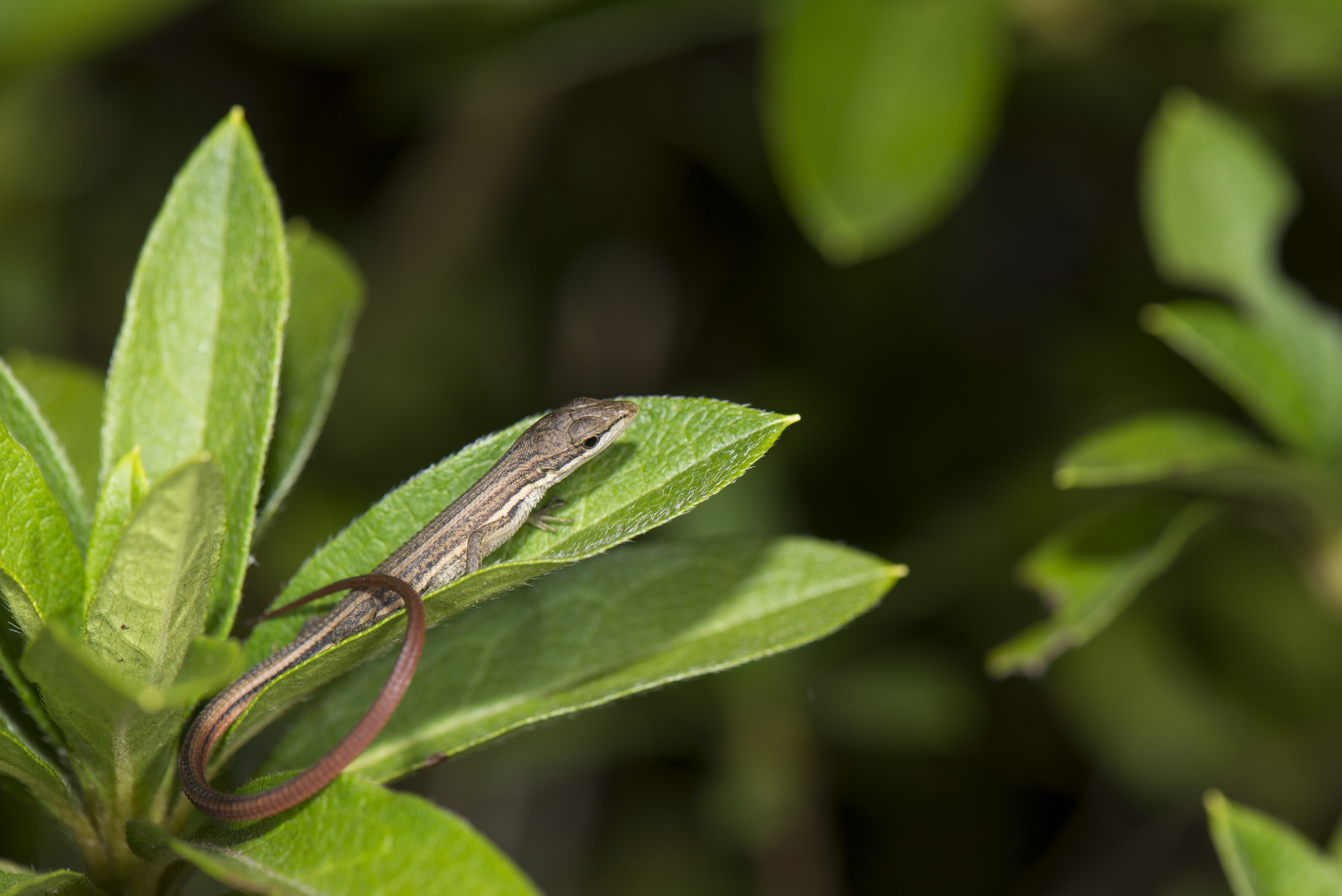

Scientific classification
- Domain: Eukaryota
- Kingdom: Animalia
- Phylum: Chordata
- Class: Reptilia
- Order: Squamata
- Family: Lacertidae
- Genus: Takydromus
- Species: T. viridipunctatus

Binomial name
- Takydromus viridipunctatus Lue & Lin, 2008

= Takydromus viridipunctatus =

Species of lizard

Takydromus viridipunctatus is a species of lizard in the family Lacertidae. It is endemic to Taiwan.
