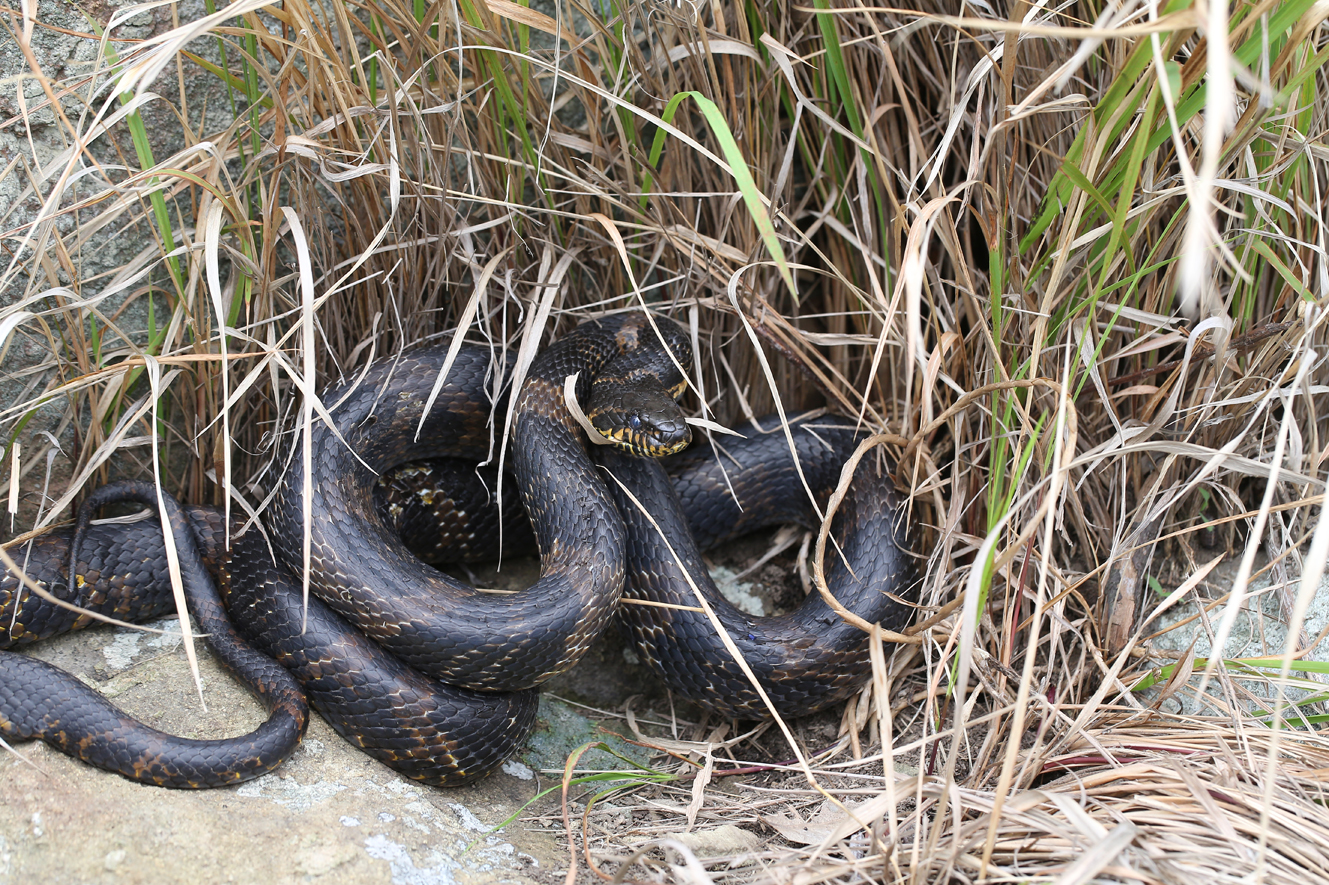

Conservation status
- Least Concern (IUCN 3.1)

Scientific classification
- Kingdom: Animalia
- Phylum: Chordata
- Class: Reptilia
- Order: Squamata
- Suborder: Serpentes
- Family: Colubridae
- Genus: Elaphe
- Species: E. schrenckii

Binomial name
- Elaphe schrenckii (Strauch, 1873)

Synonyms
- List: Elaphis Schrenckii Strauch, 1873; Coluber schrenckii — Boulenger, 1894: 48; Coluber virgatus Boettger, 1898: 51 (fide Stejneger, 1907); Elaphe schrenckii — Stejneger, 1907: 313 Elaphe schrenckii schrenckii — Pope, 1935; Elaphe schrenckii — Schulz, 1996: 235; Elaphe schrenckii — Utiger et al., 2002; Elaphe schrenki [sic] — Burbrink & Lawson, 2007 (in error); Elaphe shrenki [sic] Burbrink & Lawson, 2007 (in error); Elaphe schrenckii — Wallach et al., 2014

= Elaphe schrenckii =

Species of snake

Elaphe schrenckii is a species of nonvenomous snake in the family Colubridae. The species is indigenous to Northeast Asia.

== Common names ==
Common names for E. schrenckii include Amur rat snake, Manchurian black racer, Manchurian black water snake, Russian rat snake, Schrenck's rat snake, and Siberian rat snake.

== Taxonomy ==
Elaphe schrenckii, formerly E. schrenckii schrenckii, is similar to the Korean rat snake E. anomala, which was once thought to be a subspecies of E. schrenckii and was classified as E. schrenckii anomala. However, under the current taxonomic arrangement of Elaphe they are no longer considered as members of the same species. The Korean Ratsnake is currently classified as E. anomala while the Amur Ratsnake remains as E. schrenckii.

== Etymology ==
The specific name, schrenckii, is in honor of zoologist Leopold von Schrenck.

== Conservation ==
The species E. schrenckii is on the China Species Red List with a classification of "Vulnerable VU". It is an officially protected species in Russia and South Korea. Globally it is considered to be of "least concern" by the International Union for Conservation of Nature.

== Geographic range ==
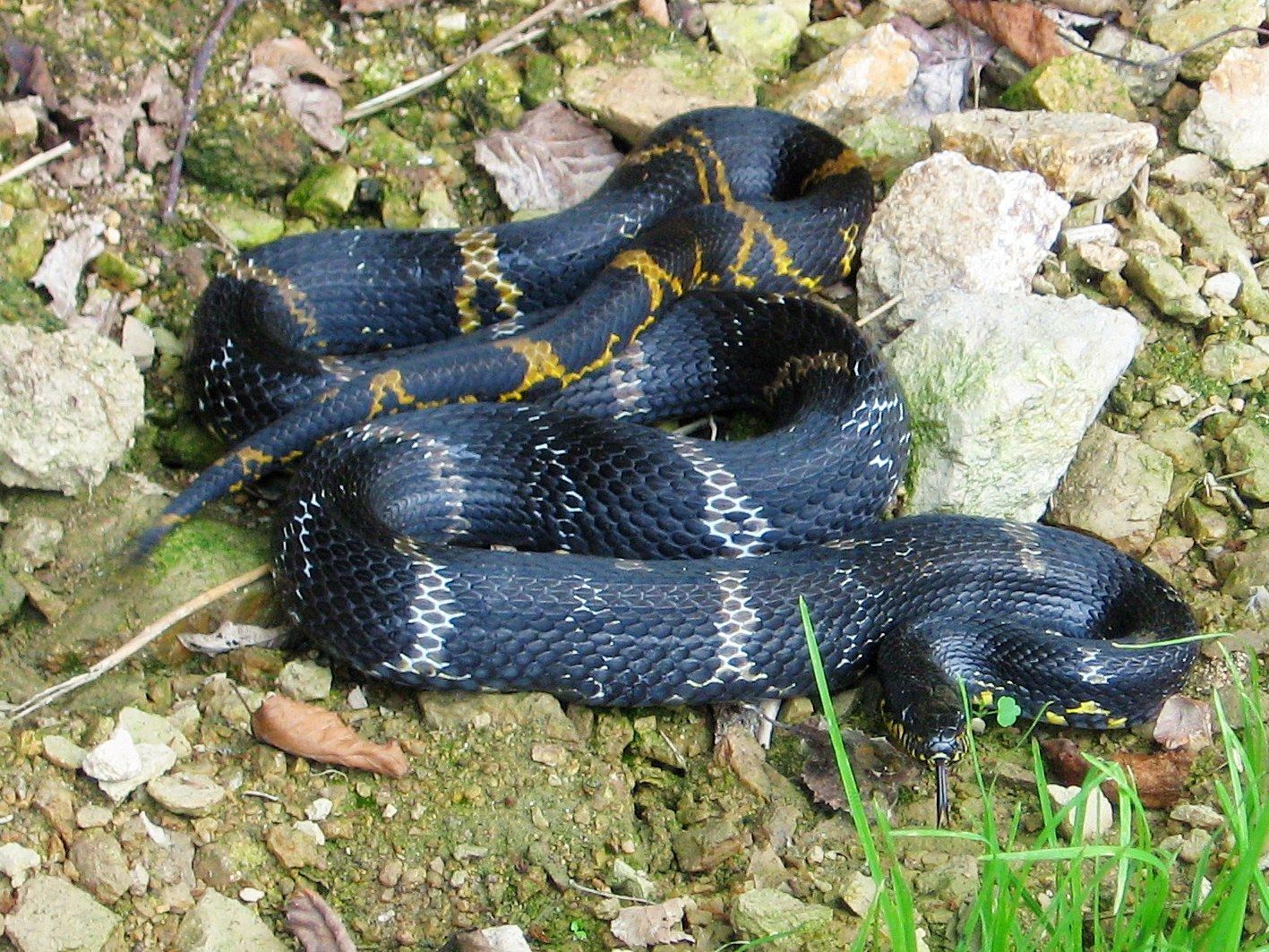
E. schrenckii

Endemic to Northeast Asia, E. schrenckii is found in China, Korea, Mongolia, and Russia. It occurs in Russia and China, to the east to Khabarovsk in the Amur region, west to the Chingan mountains, and north to Manchuria (Northeastern China). The common name, Russian rat snake, is misleading as only a small portion of the geographic range of E. schrenckii is in Russia. It has been reported from Chinese provinces of Jilin, Heilongjian, and the Quingyuan area of Liaoning. (Ji Daming e.a., 1985).

In the Netherlands the species occurs as an introduced exotic around Groningen airport near Eelde, where it was first seen in the mid nineteen nineties. Reportedly, pet snakes were released into the wild by someone who did not expect that they would survive the winter. However, the snakes which were hardier than expected bred, and the species is now gradually increasing its range.

== Habitat ==
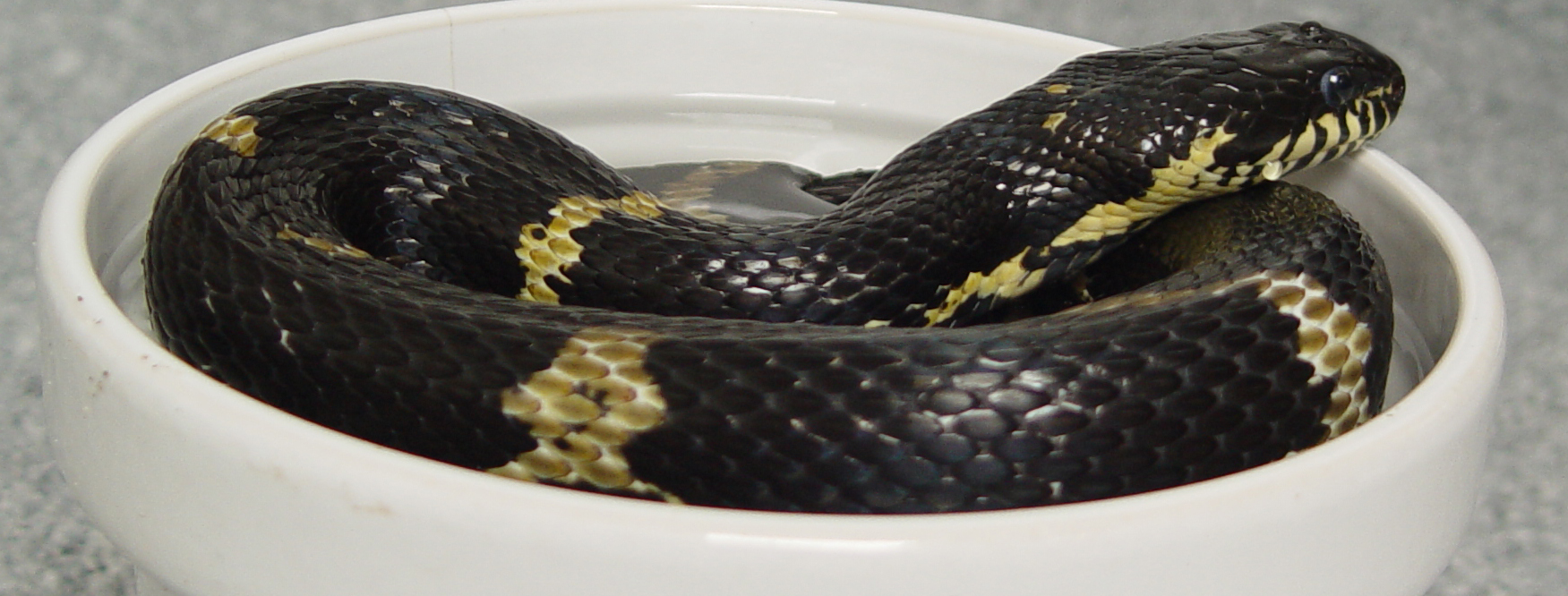
A wild-caught specimen

As one common name, Manchurian black water snake, suggests, this species inhabits fairly moist biotopes such as forest clearings, scrub, farmland, hiding amongst cavities in trees, piles of stone or wood, and when threatened can flee up a tree or into the water. E. schrencki has been noted up to 6 m (20 ft) high in trees. This species occurs up to 2,000 m (6,600 ft) altitude and can live in cooler areas than many other snakes.

== Description ==
E. schrenckii can reach average lengths (including tail) of 1.2–1.6 m (3.9–5.2 ft). It is among the most robust of all the rat snake species. It varies greatly in colouration, from creme saddles to dark brown saddles. Many captive bred specimens have been line bred to produce clean yellow saddles. The northern, darker, is the most common variety. This species has 200-236 ventral scales, 55-78 subcaudal scales, and 21-23 rows of dorsal scales.

== Behavior ==
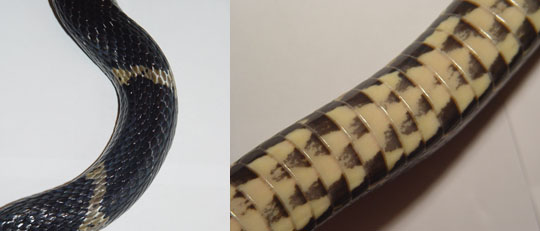
View of dorsal/ventral side

E. schrenckii feeds primarily on small mammals, birds, and bird eggs. It is often found in wetlands, but also found in a wide variety of mainly moist environments such as scrub land, farmland, river banks, swamp land, gardens, stones, log piles, forests, and up in trees. The Manchurian black water snake is an excellent swimmer (hence one common name) and is a very good climber, as it is semi-arboreal. This snake is believed to be mostly crepuscular (active only at dawn and dusk).

== Reproduction ==
Adult females of E. schrenckii lay from 6 to 30 eggs in June or July. They may retain their eggs for a time, as they may deposit them in a well-advanced state. Eggs usually hatch within 40 days.
