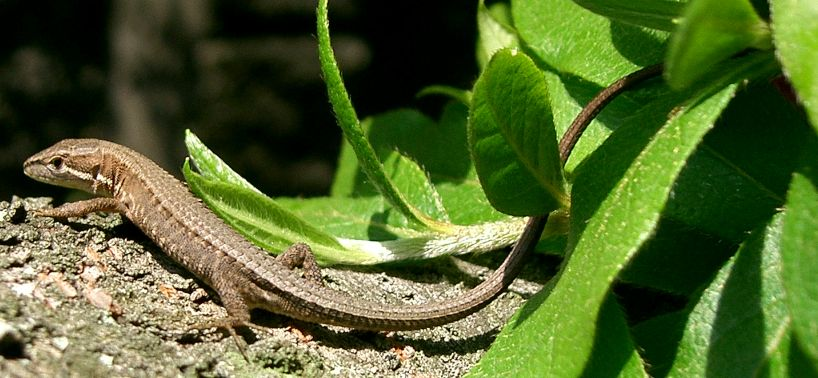
- Takydromus tachydromoides

Scientific classification
- Kingdom: Animalia
- Phylum: Chordata
- Class: Reptilia
- Order: Squamata
- Family: Lacertidae
- Subfamily: Lacertinae
- Genus: Takydromus; Daudin, 1802

= Takydromus =

Genus of lizards

Takydromus is a genus of lizards, commonly called grass lizards or oriental racers. Species of the genus Takydromus are endemic to a large part of Asia. Members of this genus are noticeable because of their slender appearance and their agile movements. The word takydromus derives from Greek ταχυδρόμος (takhudromos), "fast-running", from ταχύς (takhus), "swift" + δρόμος (dromos), "course, race".

== Description ==
Members of the genus Takydromus are extremely slender in appearance. The tail is about 2 to 5 times as long as the snout-vent length. The basic colour is normally brown, often with lateral stripes and dark spots. The dorsal scales are keeled and large. These keels form continuous longitudinal rows. The toes contain lamellae. The collar may be reduced or completely absent.

== Distribution and habitat ==
The lizard genus Takydromus is found in Japan, in the Amur region of Russia, and throughout entire eastern Asia to Indonesia. These lizards are mainly terrestrial although some species can be found on trees. Some members of this genus are found both on rocks and in relatively damp forests. Other species inhabit open grasslands.

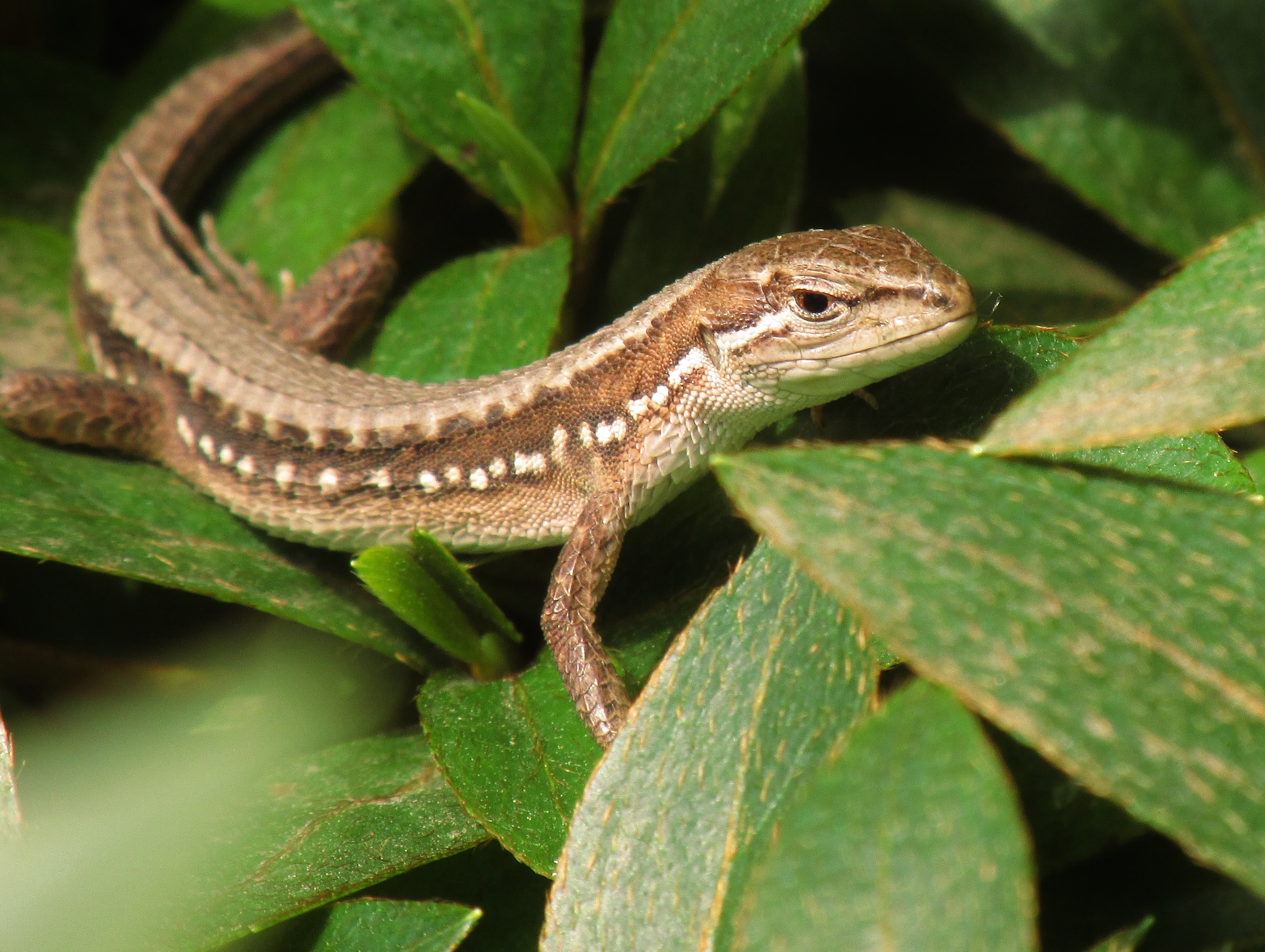
Japanese grass lizard with a sharp gaze aims for food

== Reproduction ==
Females of species of Takydromus lay 1–10 eggs per clutch and up to 6 clutches per year.

== Species ==
The genus Takydromus belongs to the lizard subfamily Lacertinae, tribe Lacertini, and contains the following species:

- Takydromus albomaculosus Y. Wang, Gong, Liu & X. Wang, 2017
- Takydromus amurensis (W. Peters, 1881) – Amur grass lizard
- Takydromus dorsalis Stejneger, 1904 – Sakishima grass lizard
- Takydromus formosanus (Boulenger, 1894) – Formosa grass lizard
- Takydromus hani Chou, Truong & Pauwels, 2001 – southeast Asian green grass lizard
- Takydromus haughtonianus (Jerdon, 1870) – Goalpara grass lizard
- Takydromus hsuehshanensis J. Lin & Cheng, 1981
- Takydromus intermedius Stejneger, 1924
- Takydromus khasiensis (Boulenger, 1917) – Java grass lizard, Khasi Hills long-tailed lizard
- Takydromus kuehnei Van Denburgh, 1909
- Takydromus luyeanus Lue & S. Lin, 2008
- Takydromus madaensis Bobrov, 2013 – Ma Da grass lizard
- Takydromus sauteri Van Denburgh, 1909 – Koshun grass lizard
- Takydromus septentrionalis (Günther, 1864) – China grass lizard
- Takydromus sexlineatus Daudin, 1802 – Asian grass lizard, six-striped long-tailed grass lizard, long-tailed grass lizard
- Takydromus sikkimensis (Günther, 1888) – Sikkim grass lizard
- Takydromus smaragdinus (Boulenger, 1887) – green grass lizard
- Takydromus stejnegeri Van Denburgh, 1912
- Takydromus sylvaticus (Pope, 1928) – Chung-an ground lizard
- Takydromus tachydromoides (Schlegel, 1838) – Japanese grass lizard
- Takydromus toyamai Takeda & Ota, 1996 – Miyako grass lizard
- Takydromus viridipunctatus Lue & S. Lin, 2008
- Takydromus wolteri (Fischer, 1885) – mountain grass lizard
- Takydromus yunkaiensis J. Wang, Lyu & Y. Wang, 2019 – Yunkai grass lizard

Nota bene: A binomial authority in parentheses indicates that the species was originally described in a genus other than Takydromus.
