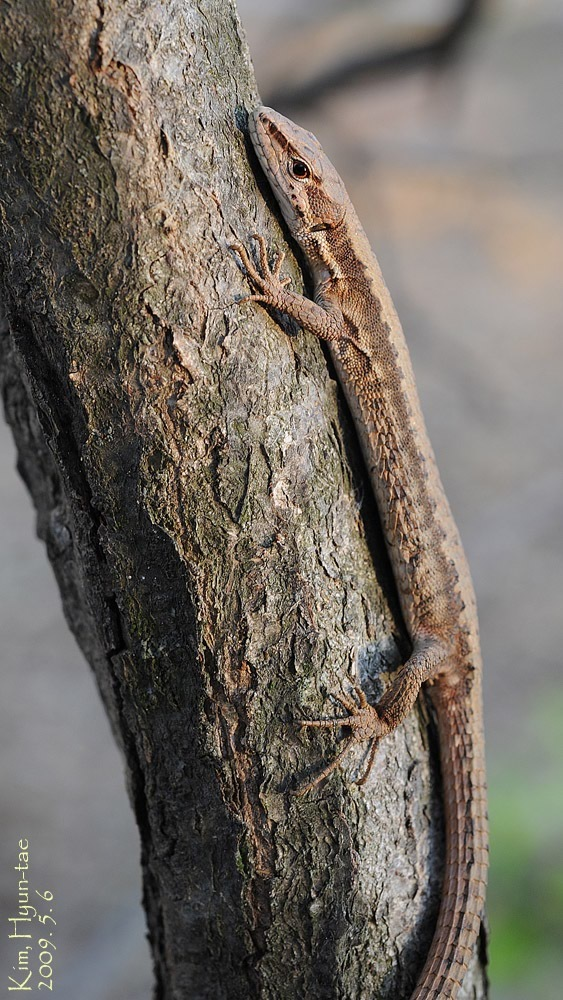

Conservation status
- Least Concern (IUCN 3.1)

Scientific classification
- Kingdom: Animalia
- Phylum: Chordata
- Class: Reptilia
- Order: Squamata
- Suborder: Lacertoidea
- Family: Lacertidae
- Genus: Takydromus
- Species: T. amurensis

Binomial name
- Takydromus amurensis Peters, 1881

= Takydromus amurensis =

Species of lizard

Takydromus amurensis, the Amur grass lizard, is a species of lizard in the family Lacertidae. It is found in Russia, China, Korea, and Japan.

== Conservation issues ==
Climate change may have both positive and negative impacts on T. amurensis. One study found that the incubation period for this species was significantly affected by ambient temperatures. In this research, outdoor mesocosms were covered with plastic wrap to create a warmer temperature, and eggs incubated at this warmer temperature hatched 8 days earlier than the eggs incubated in open mesocosms. Hatchlings incubated in the warmer temperatures also had higher survival rates than their siblings incubated under present temperature conditions. However, the overall effects of warming on habitat suitability are expected to be negative: a modeling study of five different Takydromus species predicted that T. amurensi would have high net habitat loss with a warming climate.
