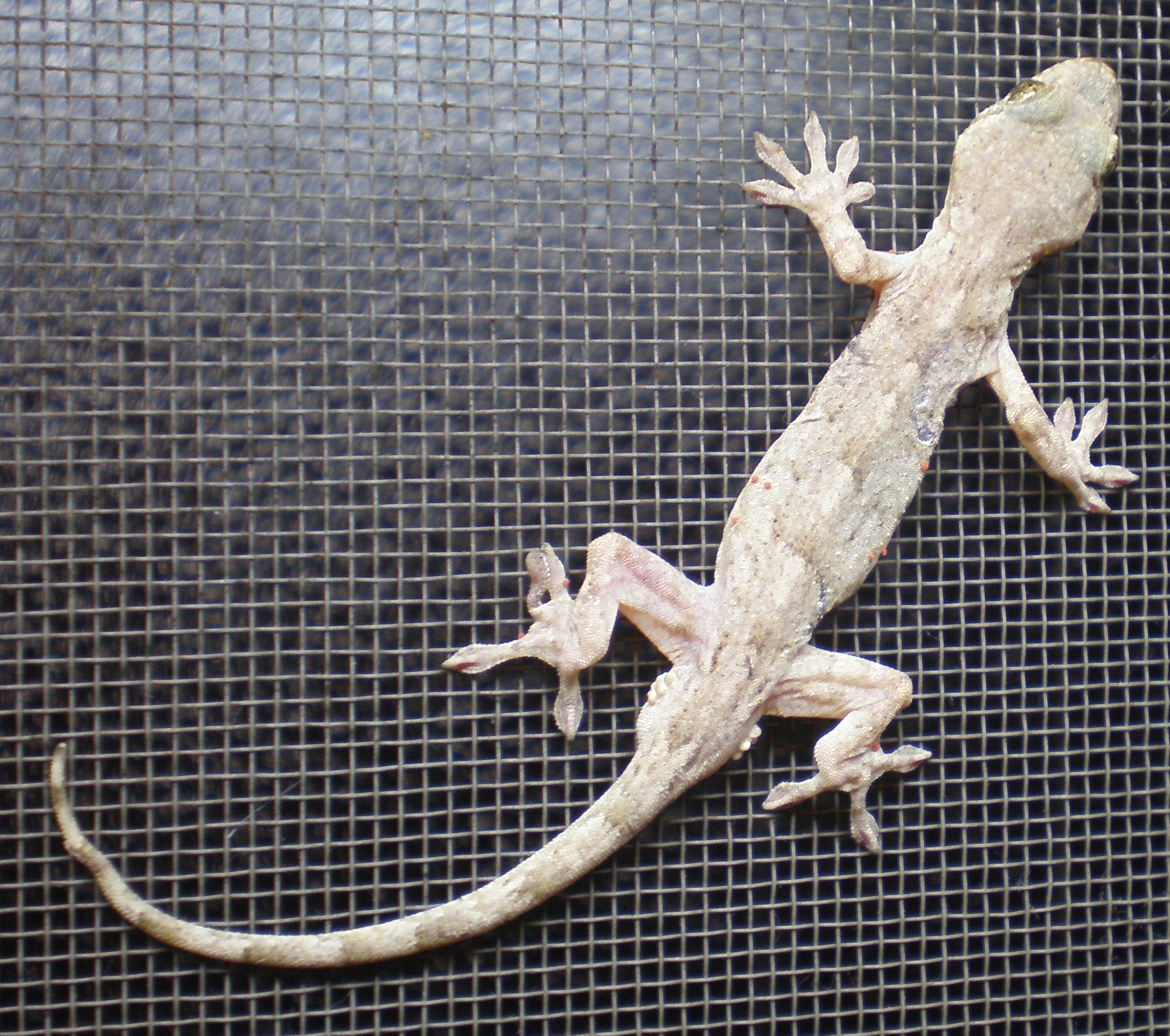

Scientific classification
- Domain: Eukaryota
- Kingdom: Animalia
- Phylum: Chordata
- Class: Reptilia
- Order: Squamata
- Infraorder: Gekkota
- Family: Gekkonidae
- Genus: Gekko
- Species: G. japonicus

Binomial name
- Gekko japonicus (Schlegel, 1836)

Synonyms
- Platydactylus japonicus; Platydactylus jamori; Platydactylus yamori; Hemidactylus nanus

= Schlegel's Japanese gecko =

Species of lizard

Schlegel's Japanese gecko (Gekko japonicus), also known as yamori in Japanese, is a species of gecko.

== Taxonomy ==
G. japonicus was classified by Hermann Schlegel in 1836. The specific epithet, japonicus, is Modern Latin for Japan.

== Distribution ==
Gekko japonicus occurs across the main islands of Japan, ranging from northern Honshu in the north and east to Kyushu in the south and west. It can also be found in eastern China and in South Korea.

Schlegel's Japanese gecko climbing on a wall in Kanagawa Prefecture, Japan

== Ecology ==
Like other species of gecko, individuals of G. japonicus primarily eat insects. The species is capable of autotomy, and will separate its tail from its body to escape predators. While this process avoids bleeding, as blood vessels at the base of the tail close to prevent blood loss, the gecko does lose a supply of fat tissue, which it can use during periods where food is scarce.

== Japanese culture ==
In Japanese culture, seeing a gecko on one's home is associated with good luck. The animal's name, yamori, translates to home-protector.
