= List of reptiles of Japan =

This list of reptiles of Japan is primarily based on the IUCN Red List, which details the conservation status of some one hundred species. Of these, five are assessed as critically endangered (the hawksbill turtle and yellow pond turtle and the endemic Toyama's ground gecko, Yamashina's ground gecko, and Kikuzato's brook snake), ten as endangered, twelve as vulnerable, thirteen as near threatened, fifty-eight as of least concern, and two as data deficient.

According to statistics accompanying the 2020 Japanese Ministry of the Environment (MoE) Red List, one hundred species and subspecies are to be found, but the conservation status of only fifty-seven is detailed. Of these, five taxa are critically endangered from a national perspective, nine are endangered, twenty-three vulnerable, seventeen near threatened, and three data deficient.

== Order: Squamata (lizards, snakes, and amphisbaenians) ==
=== Suborder: Lacertilia (lizards) ===
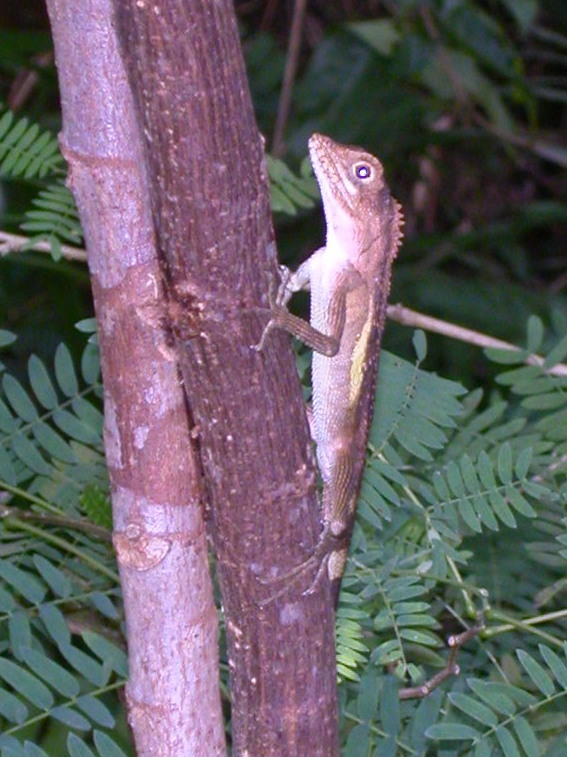
Sakishima tree lizard, D. p. ishigakiense

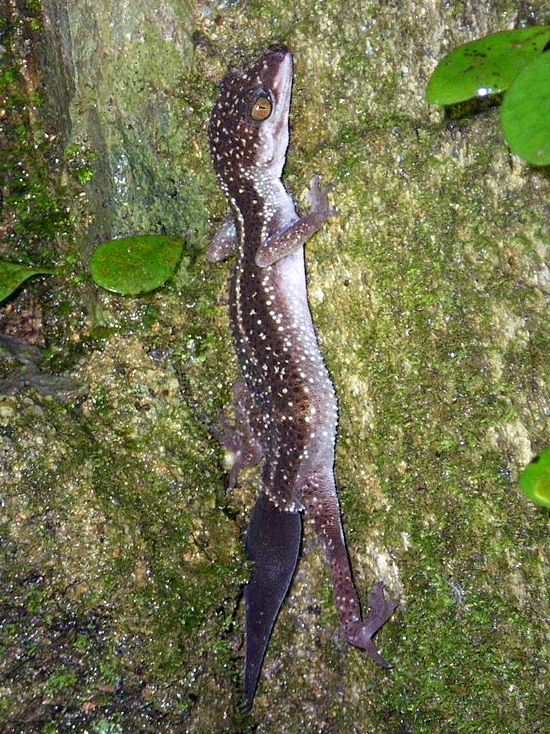
Kuroiwa's ground gecko

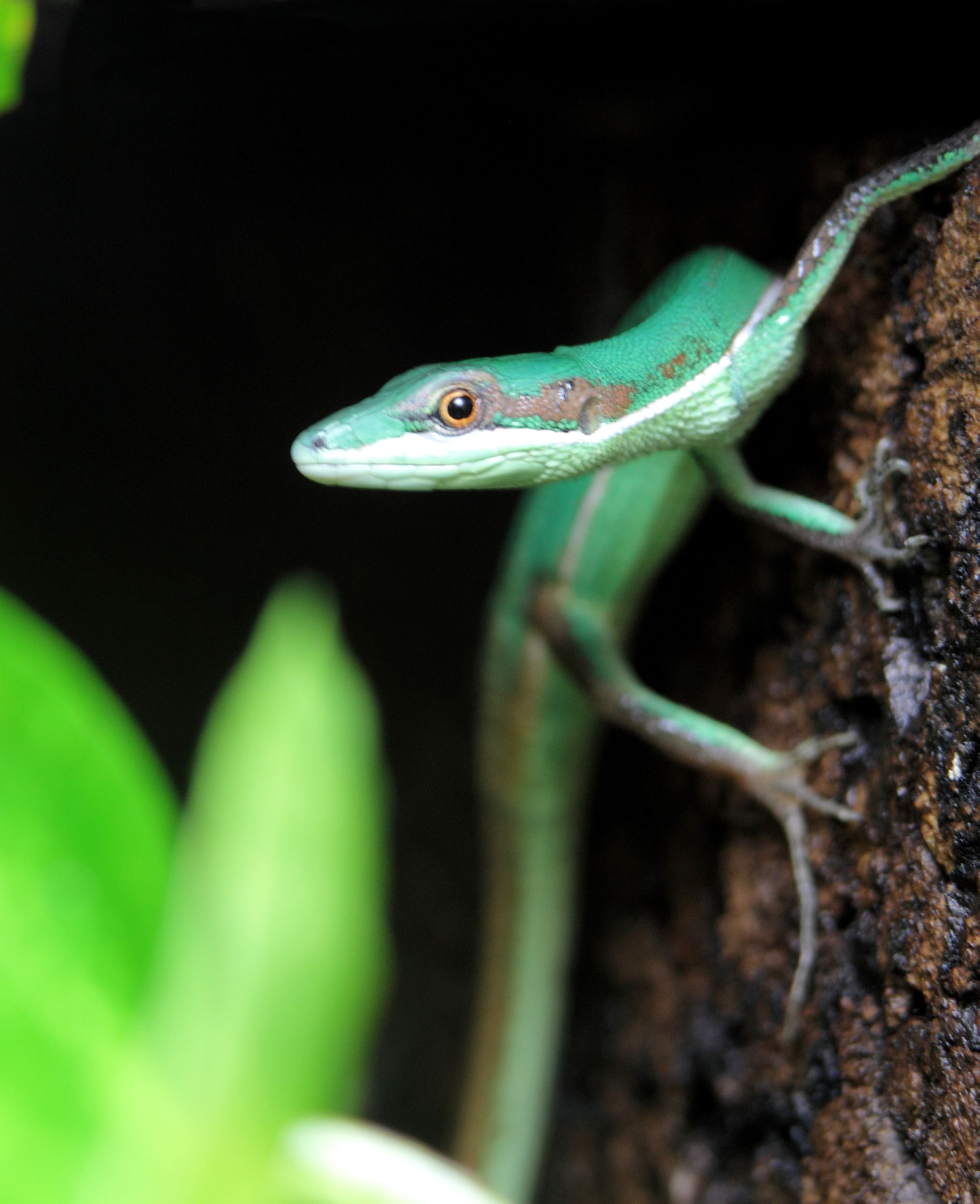
Green grass lizard, Takydromus smaragdinus

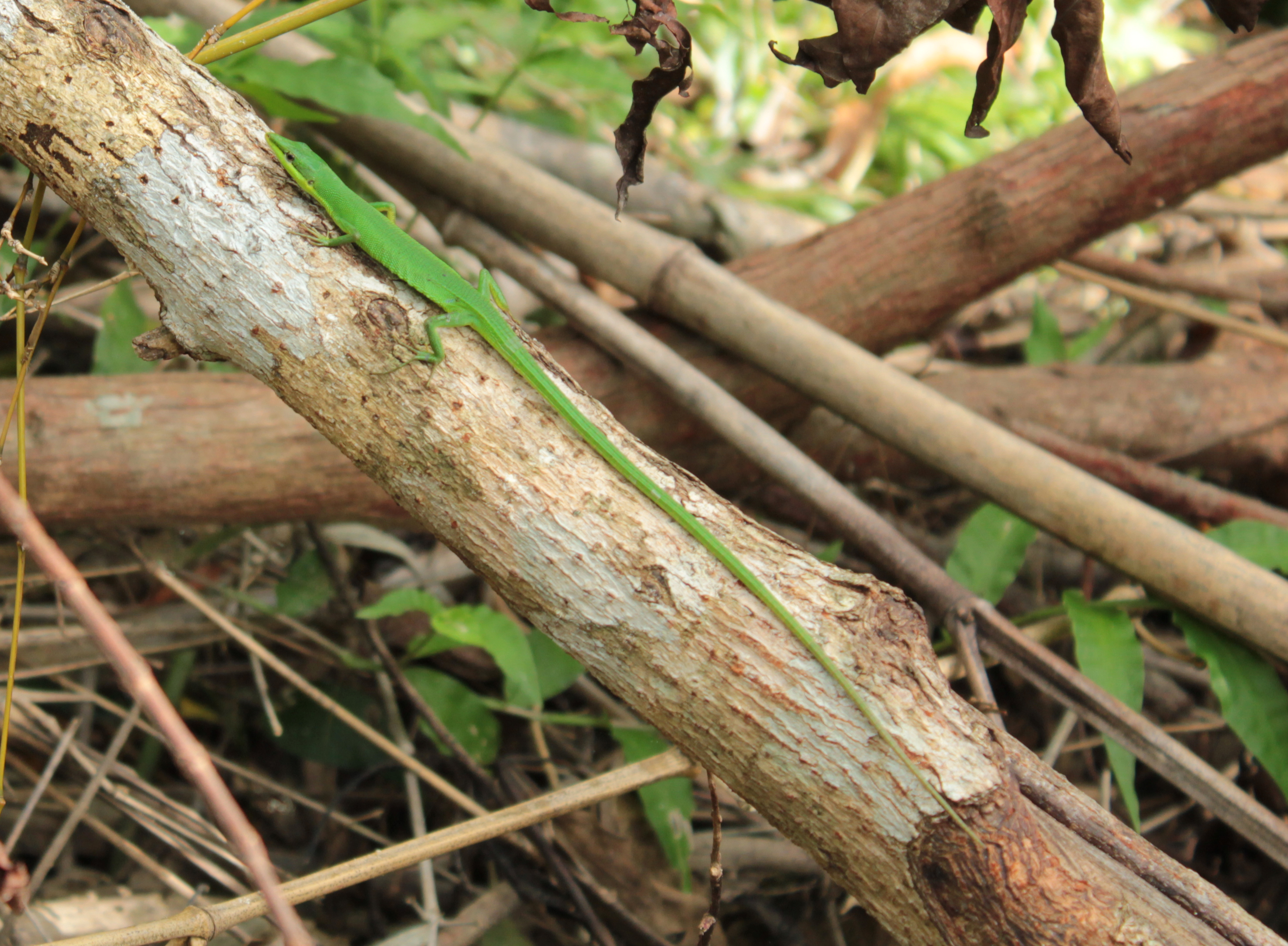
Sakishima grass lizard, Takydromus dorsalis

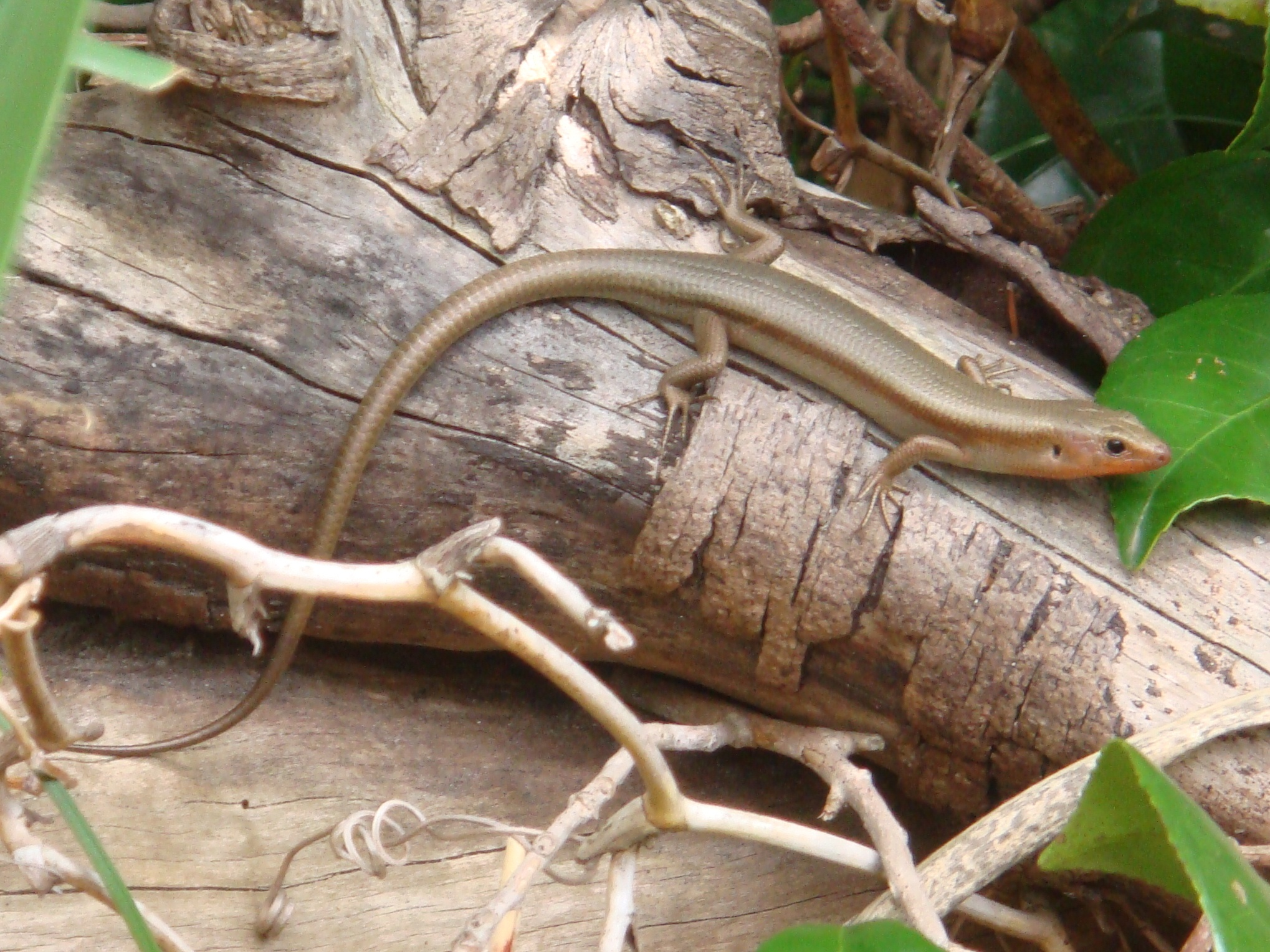
Okada's five-lined skink, Plestiodon latiscutatus

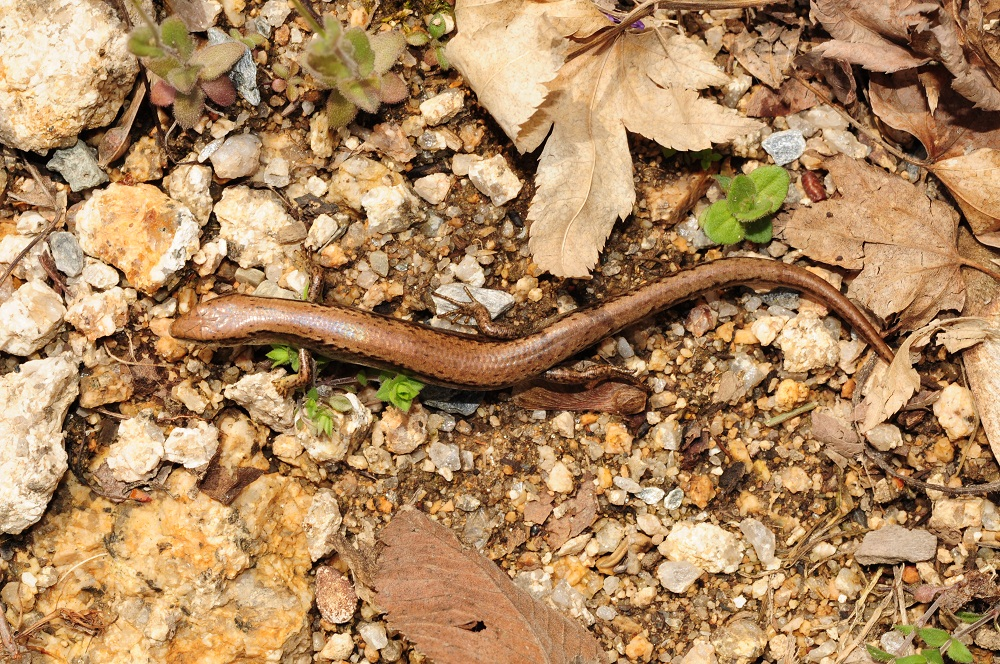
Tsushima ground skink, Scincella vandenburghi

- Family: Agamidae
  - Genus: Diploderma
    - Ryukyu japalure, Diploderma polygonatum NT^{IUCN}
      - Okinawa tree lizard, D. p. polygonatum (endemic subspecies) (MoE: VU)
      - Sakishima tree lizard, D. p. ishigakiense (endemic subspecies) (MoE: NT)
      - Yonaguni tree lizard, D. p. donan (endemic subspecies) (MoE: VU)
    - Taiwan japalure, Diploderma swinhonis LC^{IUCN} (introduced)
- Family: Dactyloidae
  - Genus: Anolis
    - Green anole, Anolis carolinensis LC^{IUCN} (introduced)
- Family: Eublepharidae
  - Genus: Goniurosaurus
    - Banded ground gecko, Goniurosaurus splendens EN^{IUCN} (endemic) (MoE: EN)
    - Kuroiwa's ground gecko, Goniurosaurus kuroiwae VU^{IUCN} (endemic)
      - Okinawa ground gecko, G. k. kuroiwae (endemic subspecies) (MoE: VU)
      - Sengoku ground gecko, G. k. sengokui (endemic subspecies) (MoE: EN)
    - Spotted ground gecko, Goniurosaurus orientalis EN^{IUCN} (endemic) (MoE: CR)
    - Toyama's ground gecko, Goniurosaurus toyamai CR^{IUCN} (endemic) (MoE: CR)
    - Yamashina's ground gecko, Goniurosaurus yamashinae CR^{IUCN} (endemic) (MoE: CR)
- Family: Gekkonidae
  - Genus: Gehyra
    - Stump-toed gecko, Gehyra mutilata LC^{IUCN}
  - Genus: Gekko
    - Hokou gecko, Gekko hokouensis LC^{IUCN}
    - Schlegel's Japanese gecko, Gekko japonicus LC^{IUCN}
    - Tawa gecko, Gekko tawaensis LC^{IUCN} (endemic) (MoE: NT)
    - Yakushima gecko, Gekko yakuensis NT^{IUCN} (endemic) (MoE: VU)
    - Gekko shibatai VU^{IUCN} (endemic) (MoE: NT)
    - Gekko vertebralis LC^{IUCN} (endemic)
  - Genus: Hemidactylus
    - Asian house gecko, Hemidactylus frenatus LC^{IUCN}
    - Bowring's gecko, Hemidactylus bowringii LC^{IUCN} (MoE: VU)
  - Genus: Hemiphyllodactylus
    - Indo-Pacific slender gecko, Hemiphyllodactylus typus LC^{IUCN} (introduced)
  - Genus: Lepidodactylus
    - Mourning gecko, Lepidodactylus lugubris LC^{IUCN}
  - Genus: Perochirus
    - Micronesia saw-tailed gecko, Perochirus ateles VU^{IUCN} (MoE: VU)
- Family: Iguanidae
  - Genus: Iguana
    - Green iguana, Iguana iguana LC^{IUCN} (introduced)
- Family: Lacertidae
  - Genus: Takydromus
    - Amur grass lizard, Takydromus amurensis LC^{IUCN} (MoE: NT)
    - Green grass lizard, Takydromus smaragdinus NT^{IUCN} (endemic)
    - Japanese grass lizard, Takydromus tachydromoides LC^{IUCN} (endemic)
    - Miyako grass lizard, Takydromus toyamai EN^{IUCN} (endemic) (MoE: CR)
    - Sakishima grass lizard, Takydromus dorsalis EN^{IUCN} (endemic) (MoE: VU)
  - Genus: Zootoca
    - Viviparous lizard, Zootoca vivipara LC^{IUCN} (MoE: VU)
- Family: Scincidae
  - Genus: Ateuchosaurus
    - Ryukyu short-legged skink, Ateuchosaurus pellopleurus LC^{IUCN} (endemic)
    - Ateuchosaurus okinavensis (endemic)
  - Genus: Cryptoblepharus
    - Ogasawara snake-eyed skink, Cryptoblepharus nigropunctatus NT^{IUCN} (endemic) (MoE: NT)
  - Genus: Emoia
    - Littoral whiptail-skink, Emoia atrocostata LC^{IUCN}
      - Beach skink, E. a. atrocostata (MoE: VU)
  - Genus: Plestiodon
    - Barbour's blue-tailed skink, Plestiodon barbouri VU^{IUCN} (endemic) (MoE: VU)
    - Far-Eastern skink, Plestiodon latiscutatus LC^{IUCN} (endemic)
    - Kishinoue's giant skink, Plestiodon kishinouyei VU^{IUCN} (endemic) (MoE: VU)
    - Okinawa blue-tailed skink, Plestiodon marginatus NT^{IUCN} (endemic) (MoE: VU)
    - Ousima skink, Plestiodon oshimensis NT^{IUCN} (endemic) (MoE: NT)
    - Senkaku skink, Plestiodon takarai DD^{IUCN} (endemic) (MoE: EN)
    - Shanghai elegant skink, Plestiodon elegans LC^{IUCN}
    - Stimpson's skink, Plestiodon stimpsonii NT^{IUCN} (endemic) (MoE: NT)
    - Plestiodon finitimus LC^{IUCN}
    - Plestiodon japonicus LC^{IUCN} (endemic)
    - Plestiodon kuchinoshimensis VU^{IUCN} (endemic) (MoE: DD)
  - Genus: Scincella
    - Boettger's ground skink, Scincella boettgeri LC^{IUCN} (endemic)
    - Tsushima ground skink, Scincella vandenburghi LC^{IUCN}
    - Yonaguni ground skink, Scincella dunan (endemic)

=== Suborder: Serpentes (snakes) ===
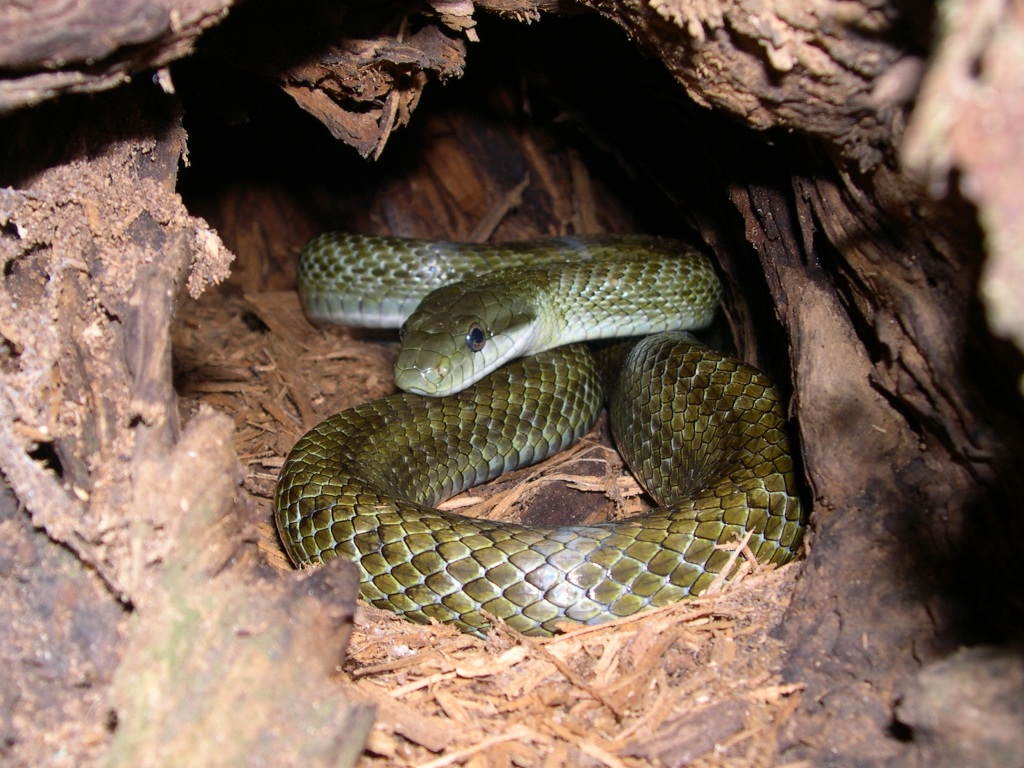
Japanese ratsnake, Elaphe climacophora

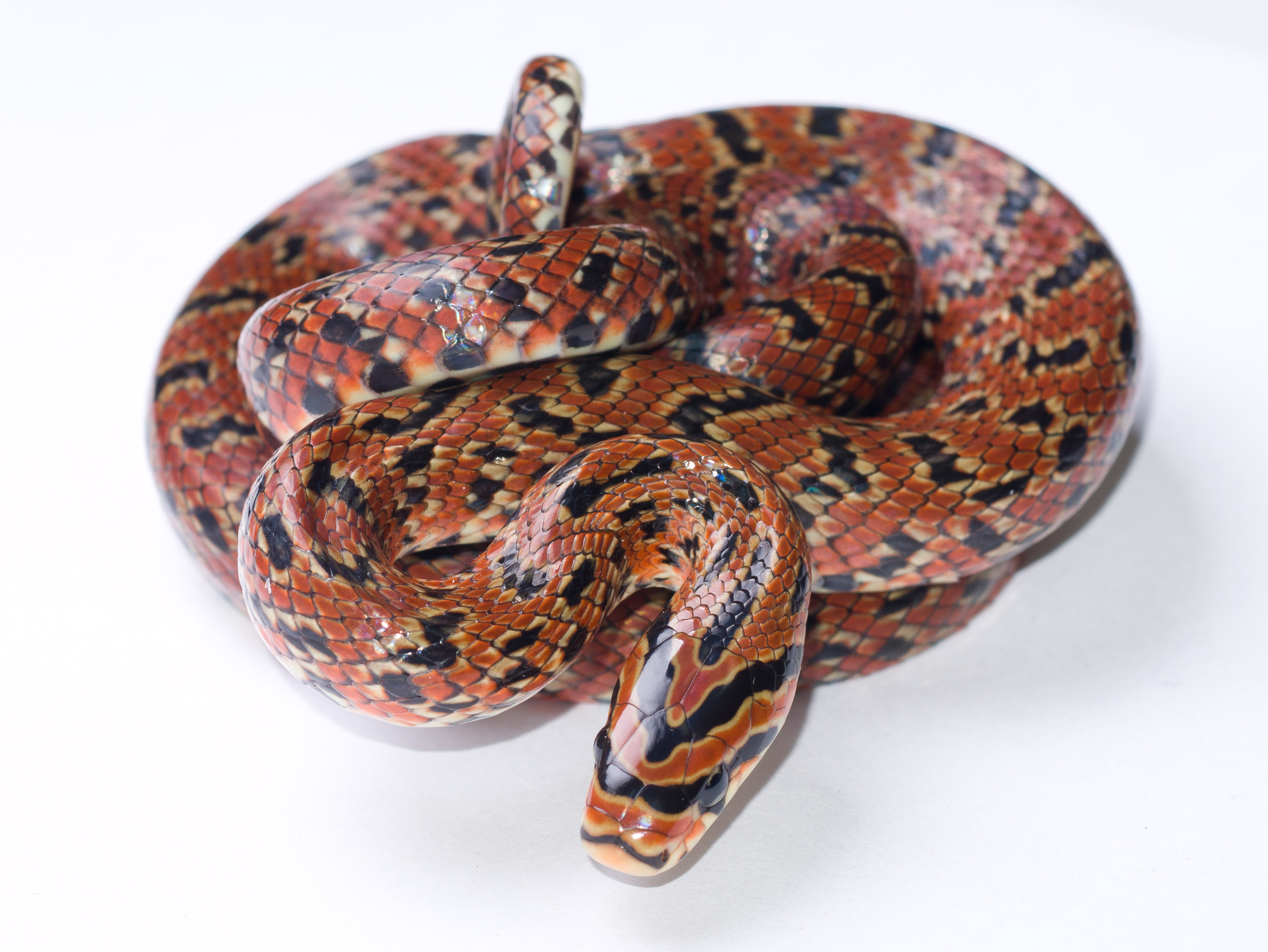
Japanese woodsnake, Euprepiophis conspicillata

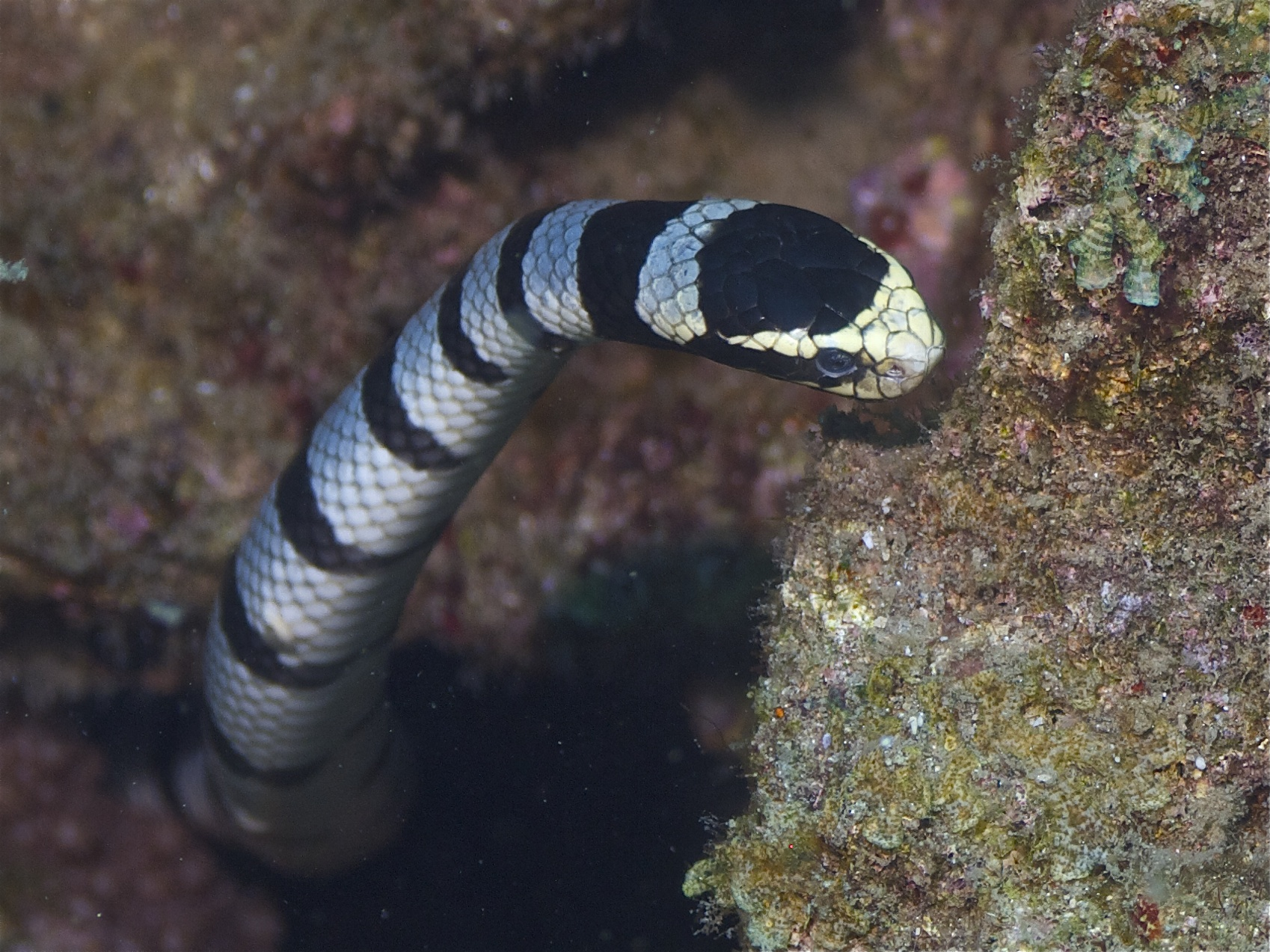
Colubrine sea krait, Laticauda colubrina

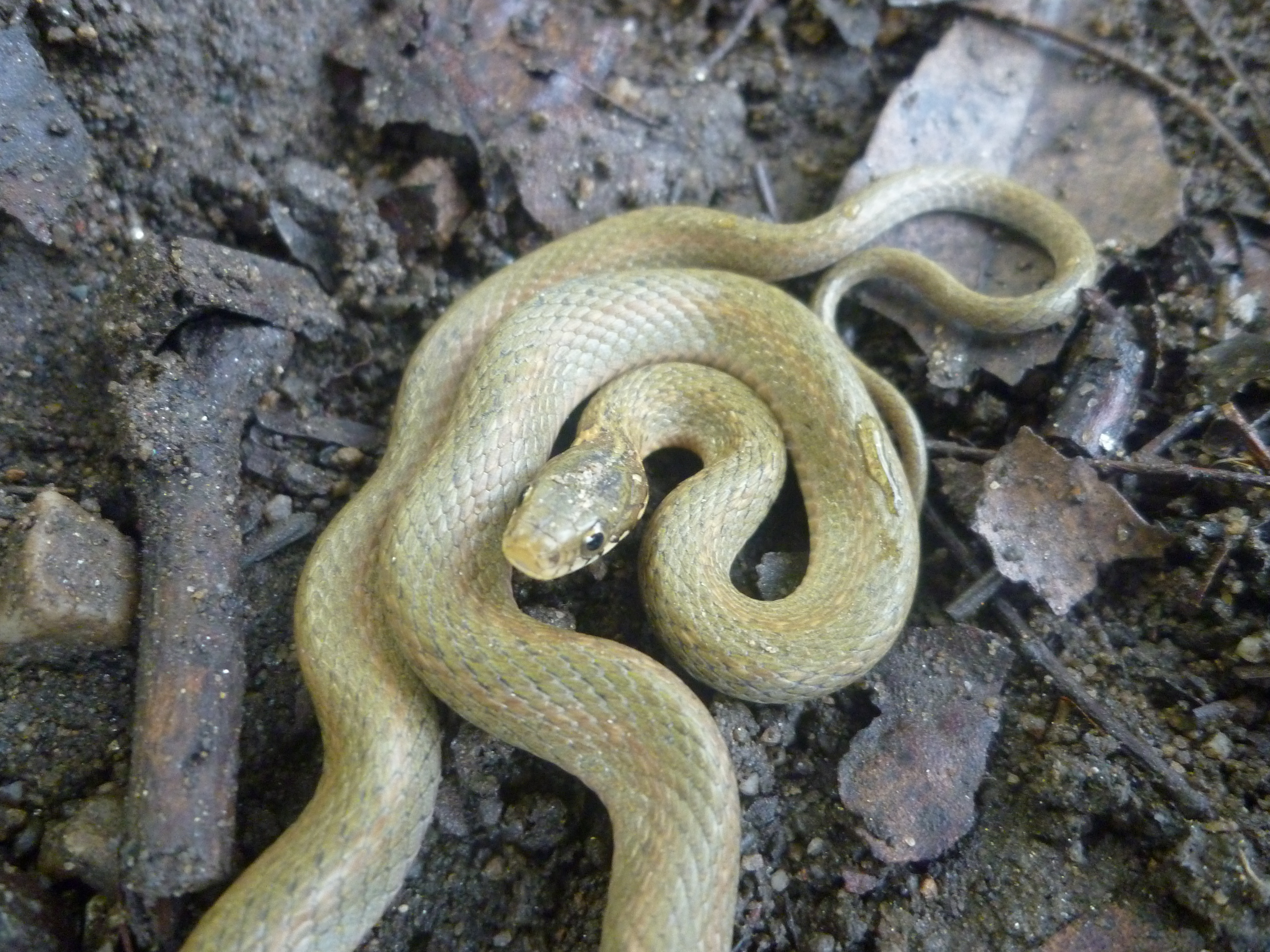
Japanese keelback, Hebius vibakari

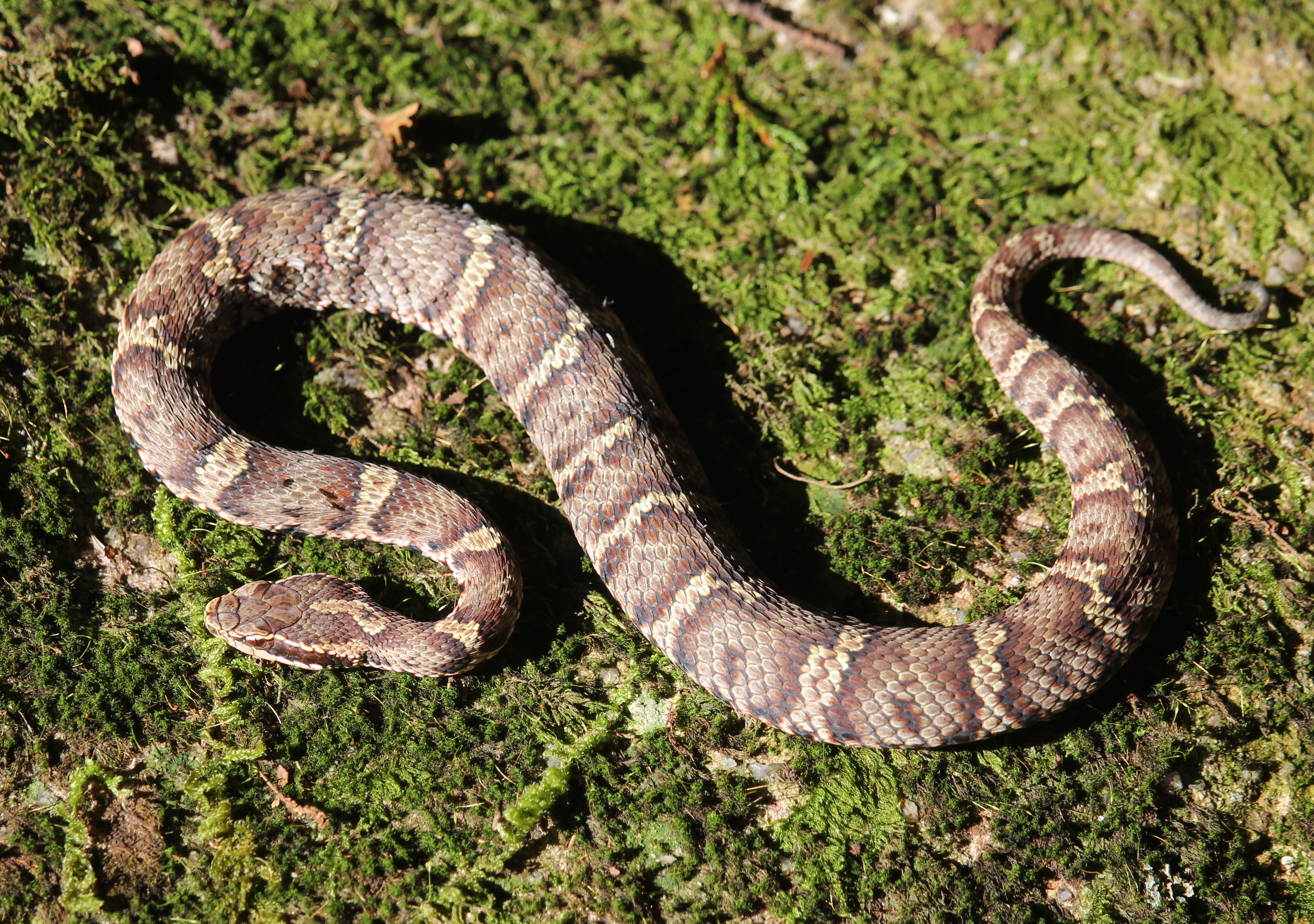
Mamushi, Gloydius blomhoffii

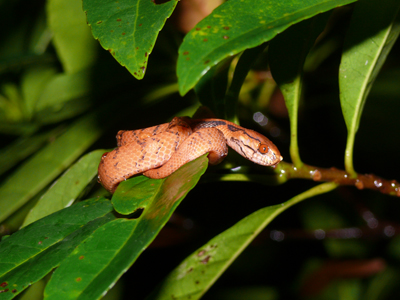
Iwasaki's snail-eater, Pareas iwasakii

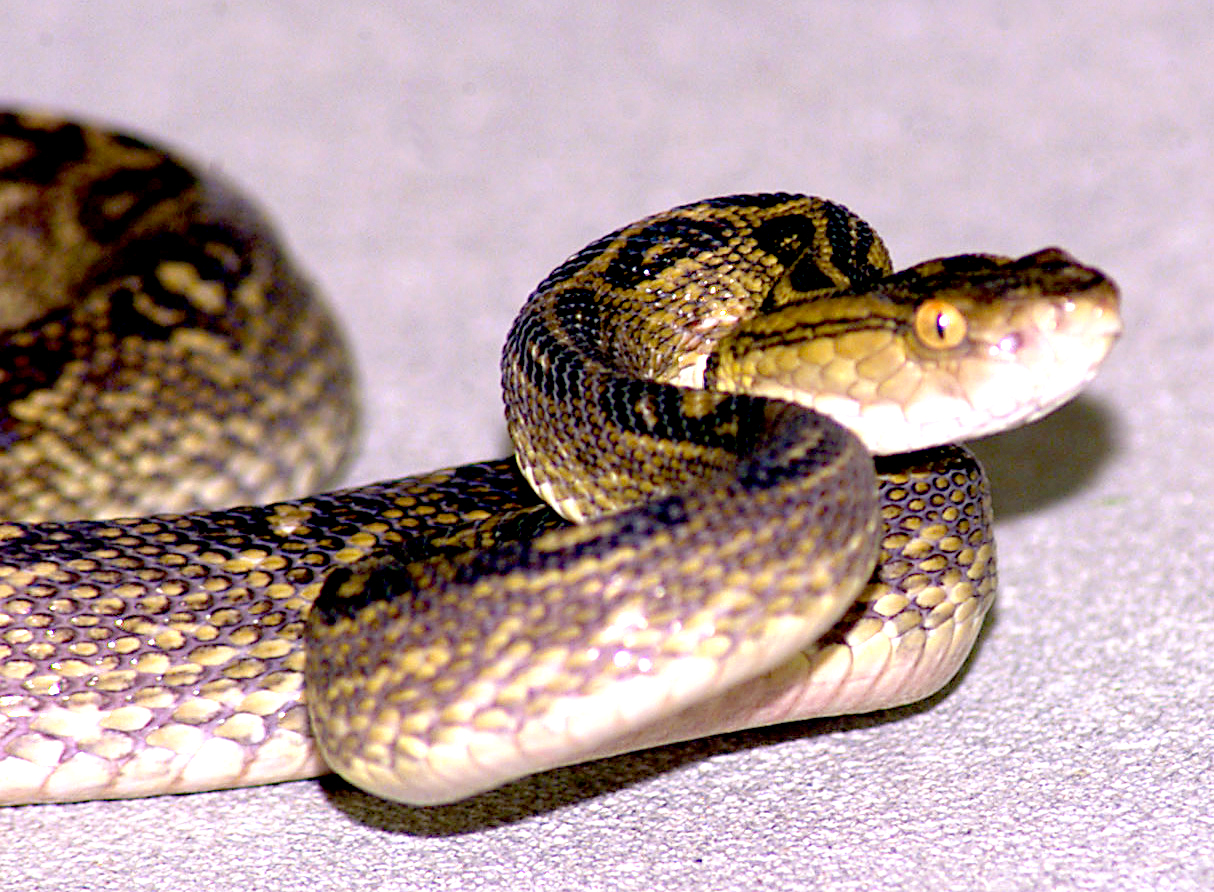
Habu, Protobothrops flavoviridis

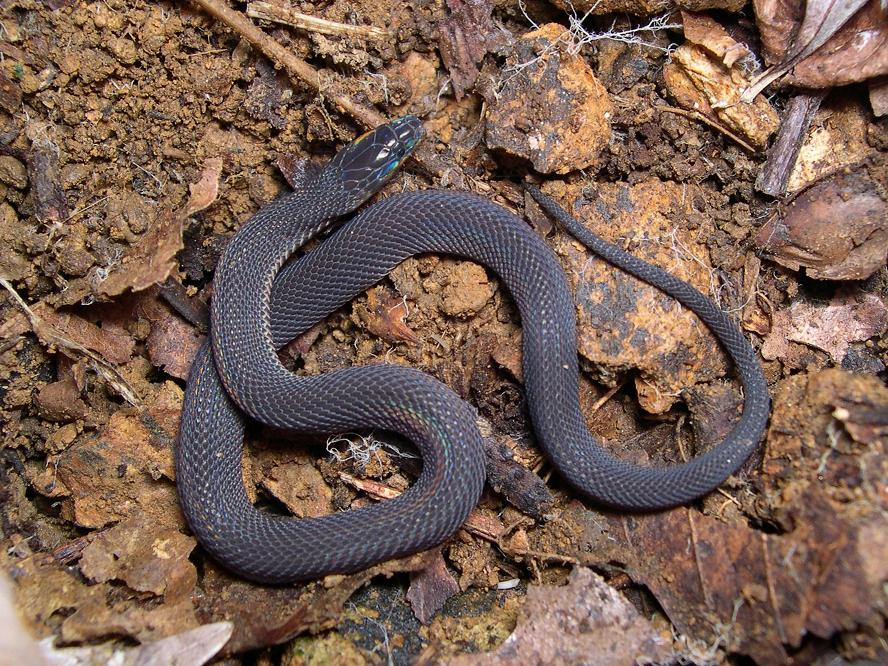
Japanese odd-scaled snake, Achalinus spinalis

- Family: Calamariidae
  - Genus: Calamaria
    - Collared reed snake, Calamaria pavimentata LC^{IUCN}
      - Miyara's collared reed snake, C. p. miyarai (MoE: VU)
    - Pfeffer's reed snake, Calamaria pfefferi EN^{IUCN} (endemic) (MoE: EN)
- Family: Colubridae
  - Genus: Elaphe
    - Beauty ratsnake, Elaphe taeniura VU^{IUCN}
      - Sakishima beauty ratsnake, E. t. schmackeri (endemic subspecies) (MoE: VU)
      - Taiwan beauty ratsnake, E. t. friesi (introduced)
    - Japanese four-lined ratsnake, Elaphe quadrivirgata LC^{IUCN}
    - Japanese ratsnake, Elaphe climacophora LC^{IUCN} (albino form at Iwakuni is a Natural Monument)
    - Keeled ratsnake, Elaphe carinata LC^{IUCN}
      - Chinese keeled ratsnake, E. c. carinata (MoE: EN)
      - Yonaguni keeled ratsnake, E. c. yonaguniensis (endemic subspecies) (MoE: EN)
  - Genus: Euprepiophis
    - Japanese woodsnake, Euprepiophis conspicillata LC^{IUCN}
  - Genus: Lycodon
    - Ryukyu odd-tooth snake, Lycodon semicarinatus LC^{IUCN} (endemic)
    - Oriental odd-tooth snake, Lycodon orientalis LC^{IUCN} (endemic)
    - Red-banded snake, Lycodon rufozonatus LC^{IUCN}
      - Red-banded odd-tooth snake, L. r. rufozonatus (MoE: NT)
      - Sakishima odd-tooth snake, L. r. walli (endemic subspecies)
    - Ruhstrat's wolf snake, Lycodon ruhstrati LC^{IUCN}
    - Lycodon multifasciatus LC^{IUCN} (endemic) (MoE: NT)
  - Genus: Ptyas
    - Ryukyu green snake, Ptyas semicarinatus LC^{IUCN} (endemic)
    - Sakishima green snake, Ptyas herminae LC^{IUCN} (endemic) (MoE: NT)
  - Genus: Rhabdophis
    - Tiger keelback, Rhabdophis tigrinus LC^{IUCN}
- Family: Elapidae
  - Genus: Emydocephalus
    - Ijima's sea snake, Emydocephalus ijimae LC^{IUCN} (MoE: VU)
  - Genus: Hydrophis
    - Annulated sea snake, Hydrophis cyanocinctus LC^{IUCN}
    - Black-headed sea snake, Hydrophis melanocephalus DD^{IUCN}
    - Ornate reef sea snake, Hydrophis ornatus LC^{IUCN}
      - Ryukyu ornate sea snake, H. o. maresinensis
    - Stokes's sea snake, Hydrophis stokesii LC^{IUCN}
    - Viperine sea snake, Hydrophis viperinus LC^{IUCN}
    - Yellow-bellied sea snake, Hydrophis platurus LC^{IUCN}
  - Genus: Laticauda
    - Blue-banded sea krait, Laticauda laticaudata LC^{IUCN} (MoE: VU)
    - Black-banded sea krait, Laticauda semifasciata NT^{IUCN} (MoE: VU)
    - Colubrine sea krait, Laticauda colubrina LC^{IUCN}
  - Genus: Sinomicrurus
    - Japanese coral snake, Sinomicrurus japonicus NT^{IUCN} (endemic)
      - Amami coral snake, S. j. japonicus (endemic subspecies) (MoE: NT)
      - Okinawa coral snake, S. j. boettgeri (endemic subspecies) (MoE: NT)
    - MacClelland's coral snake, Sinomicrurus macclellandi LC^{IUCN}
      - Iwasaki's coral snake, S. m. iwasakii (endemic subspecies) (MoE: VU)
- Family: Natricidae
  - Genus: Hebius
    - Japanese keelback, Hebius vibakari LC^{IUCN}
      - Danjo keelback, H. v. danjoense (endemic subspecies) (MoE: DD)
    - Pryer's keelback, Hebius pryeri LC^{IUCN} (endemic)
    - Yaeyama keelback, Hebius ishigakiense NT^{IUCN} (endemic)
    - Miyako keelback, Hebius concelarum EN^{IUCN} (endemic) (MoE: EN)
  - Genus: Opisthotropis
    - Kikuzato's brook snake, Opisthotropis kikuzatoi CR^{IUCN} (endemic) (MoE: CR)
- Family: Pareidae
  - Genus: Pareas
    - Iwasaki's snail-eater, Pareas iwasakii NT^{IUCN} (endemic) (MoE: NT)
- Family: Typhlopidae
  - Genus: Indotyphlops braminus
    - Brahminy blind snake, Indotyphlops braminus LC^{IUCN} (introduced)
- Family: Viperidae
  - Genus: Gloydius
    - Mamushi, Gloydius blomhoffii LC^{IUCN}
    - Tsushima Island pitviper, Gloydius tsushimaensis LC^{IUCN} (endemic)
  - Genus: Ovophis
    - Ryukyu island pitviper, Ovophis okinavensis LC^{IUCN} (endemic)
  - Genus: Protobothrops
    - Sakishima habu, Protobothrops elegans LC^{IUCN} (endemic)
    - Habu, Protobothrops flavoviridis LC^{IUCN} (endemic)
    - Pointed-scaled pitviper, Protobothrops mucrosquamatus LC^{IUCN} (introduced)
    - Tokara habu, Protobothrops tokarensis VU^{IUCN} (endemic) (MoE: NT)
- Family: Xenodermidae
  - Genus: Achalinus
    - Amami odd-scaled snake, Achalinus werneri NT^{IUCN} (endemic) (MoE: NT)
    - Formosan odd-scaled snake, Achalinus formosanus LC^{IUCN}
      - Yaeyama odd-scaled snake, A. f. chigirai (endemic subspecies) (MoE: VU)
    - Japanese odd-scaled snake, Achalinus spinalis LC^{IUCN}

== Order: Testudines (turtles) ==
=== Superfamily: Chelonioidea (sea turtles) ===
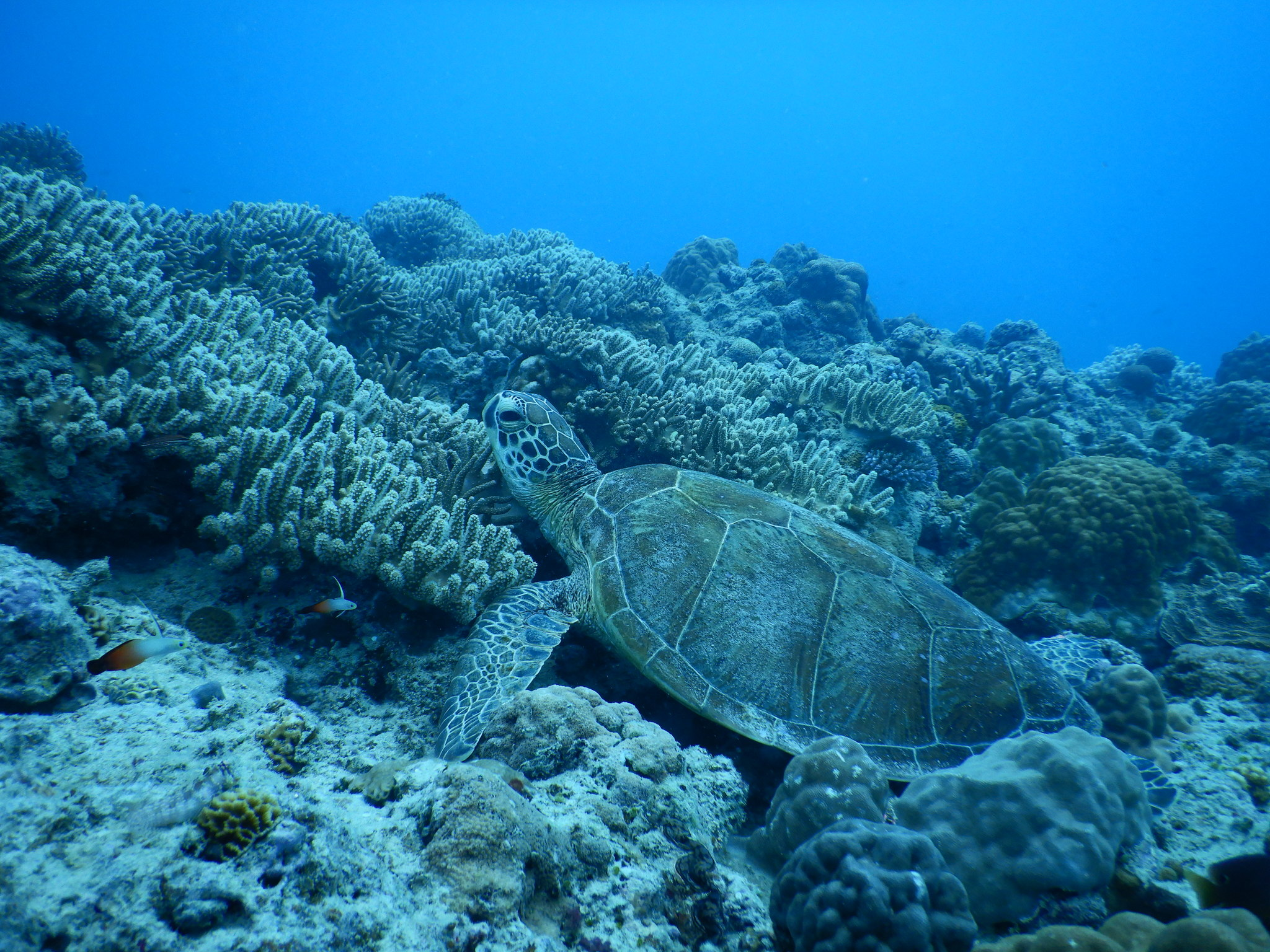
Green sea turtle, Chelonia mydas, near Naha in Japan

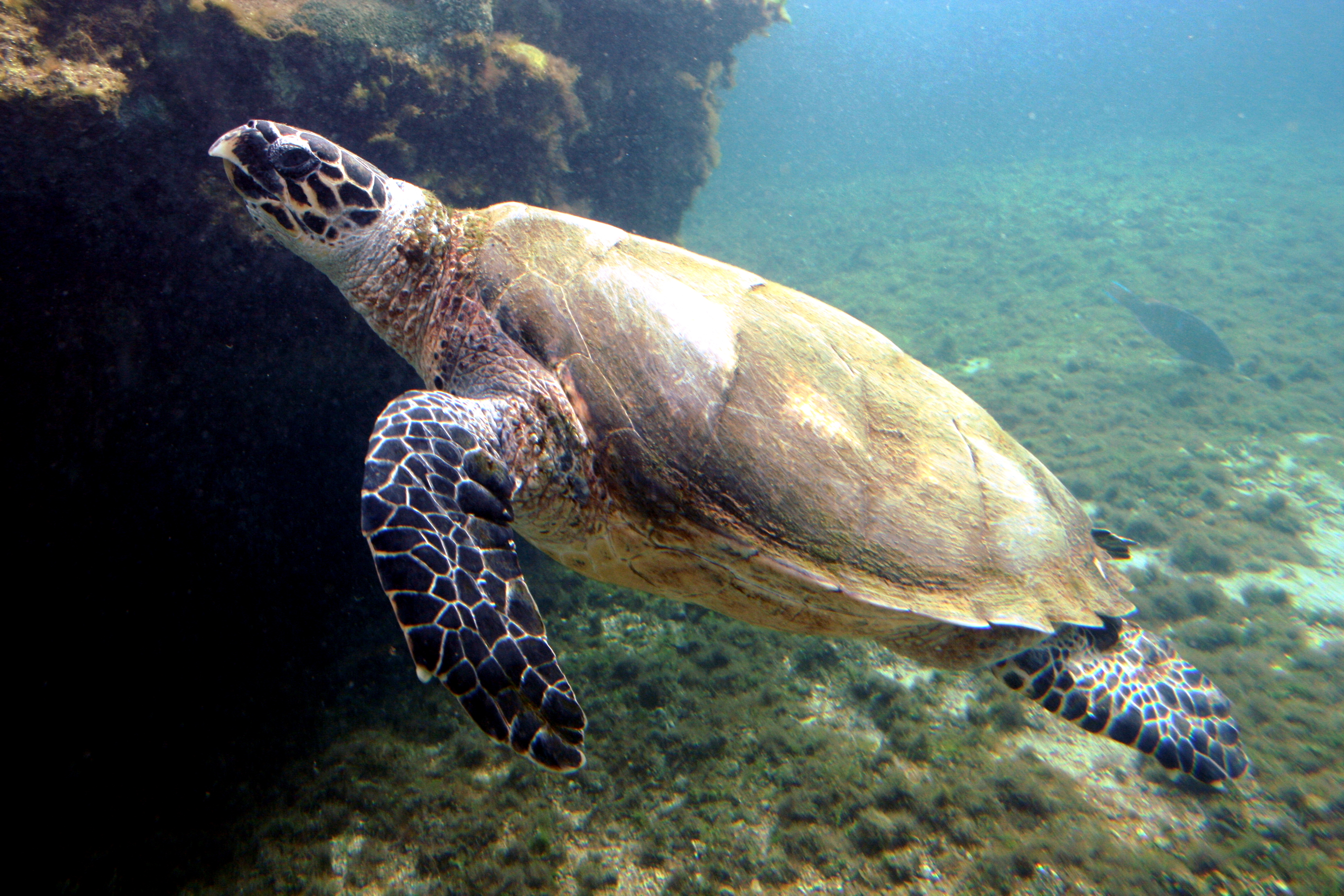
Hawksbill sea turtle

- Family: Cheloniidae
  - Genus: Caretta
    - Loggerhead sea turtle, Caretta caretta VU^{IUCN} (MoE: EN)
  - Genus: Chelonia
    - Green sea turtle, Chelonia mydas EN^{IUCN} (MoE: VU)
  - Genus: Eretmochelys
    - Hawksbill sea turtle, Eretmochelys imbricata CR^{IUCN} (MoE: EN)
  - Genus: Lepidochelys
    - Olive ridley sea turtle, Lepidochelys olivacea VU^{IUCN}
- Family: Dermochelyidae
  - Genus: Dermochelys
    - Leatherback sea turtle, Dermochelys coriacea VU^{IUCN}

=== Superfamily: Chelydroidea (snapping turtles) ===
- Family: Chelydridae
  - Genus: Chelydra
    - Snapping turtle, Chelydra serpentina LC^{IUCN} (introduced)

=== Superfamily: Testudinoidea (pond turtles and Geoemydid turtles) ===
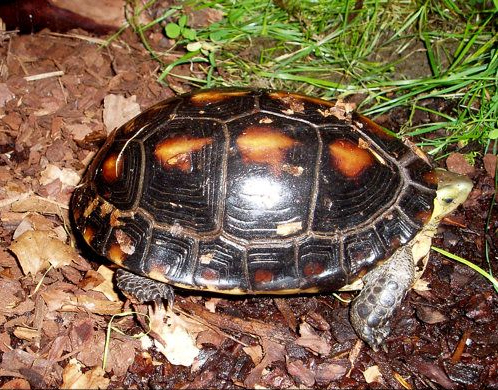
Ryukyu yellow-margined box turtle

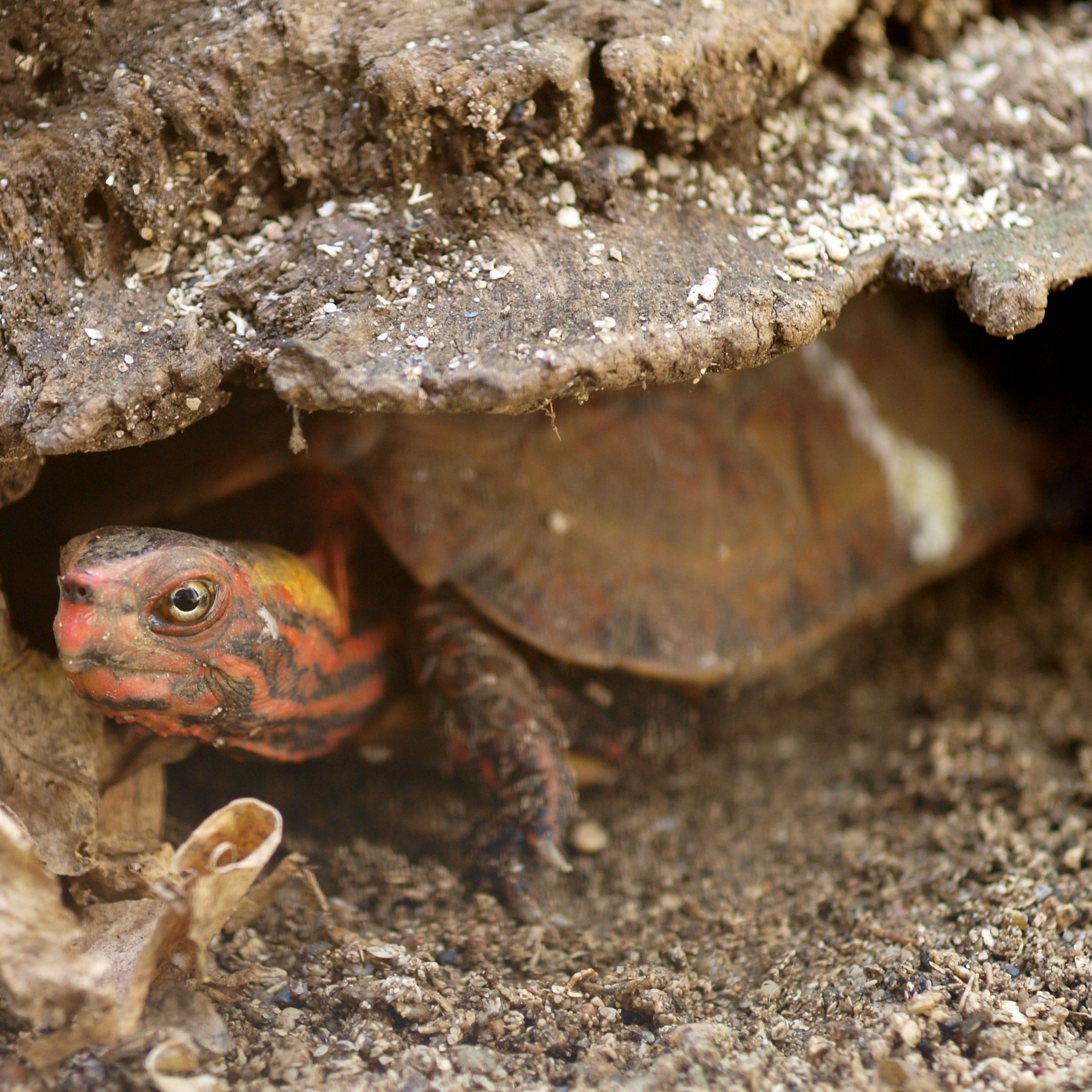
Ryukyu black-breasted leaf turtle, Geoemyda japonica

- Family: Emydidae
  - Genus: Trachemys
    - Yellow-bellied slider turtle, Trachemys scripta LC^{IUCN} (introduced)
      - Red-eared slider turtle, T. s. elegans (introduced)
- Family: Geoemydidae
  - Genus: Cuora
    - Yellow-margined box turtle, Cuora flavomarginata EN^{IUCN}
      - Ryukyu yellow-margined box turtle, C. f. evelynae (endemic subspecies) (MoE: VU)
  - Genus: Geoemyda
    - Ryukyu black-breasted leaf turtle, Geoemyda japonica EN^{IUCN} (endemic) (MoE: VU)
  - Genus: Mauremys
    - Japanese pond turtle, Mauremys japonica NT^{IUCN} (endemic) (MoE: NT)
    - Reeves' pond turtle, Mauremys reevesii EN^{IUCN} (introduced)
    - Yellow pond turtle, Mauremys mutica CR^{IUCN}
      - Asian yellow pond turtle, M. m. mutica
      - Ryukyu yellow pond turtle, M. m. kami (endemic subspecies) (MoE: VU)

=== Superfamily: Trionychia (softshell turtles) ===
- Family: Trionychidae
  - Genus: Pelodiscus
    - Chinese softshell turtle, Pelodiscus sinensis VU^{IUCN} (MoE: DD)

== Japanese names ==
The Japanese names for the taxa found in Japan have been collated and published by the Herpetological Society of Japan.

== See also ==
- List of animals in Japan
- Wildlife Protection Areas in Japan
