= Ryukyu short-legged skink =

There are two species of lizard named Ryukyu short-legged skink:

- Ateuchosaurus pellopleurus
- Ateuchosaurus okinavensis
