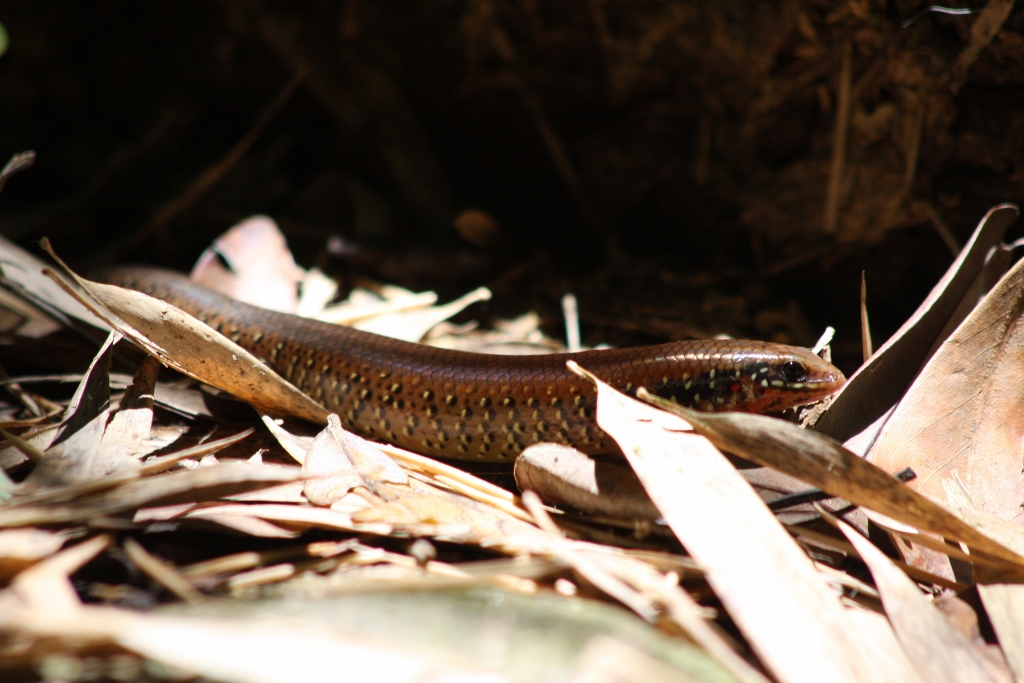

Conservation status
- Least Concern (IUCN 3.1)

Scientific classification
- Kingdom: Animalia
- Phylum: Chordata
- Class: Reptilia
- Order: Squamata
- Family: Scincidae
- Genus: Ateuchosaurus
- Species: A. chinensis

Binomial name
- Ateuchosaurus chinensis JE Gray, 1845

= Ateuchosaurus chinensis =

Species of lizard

Ateuchosaurus chinensis, the Chinese short-limbed skink or Chinese ateuchosaurus, is a species of skink. It is found in China and Vietnam.

== Description ==
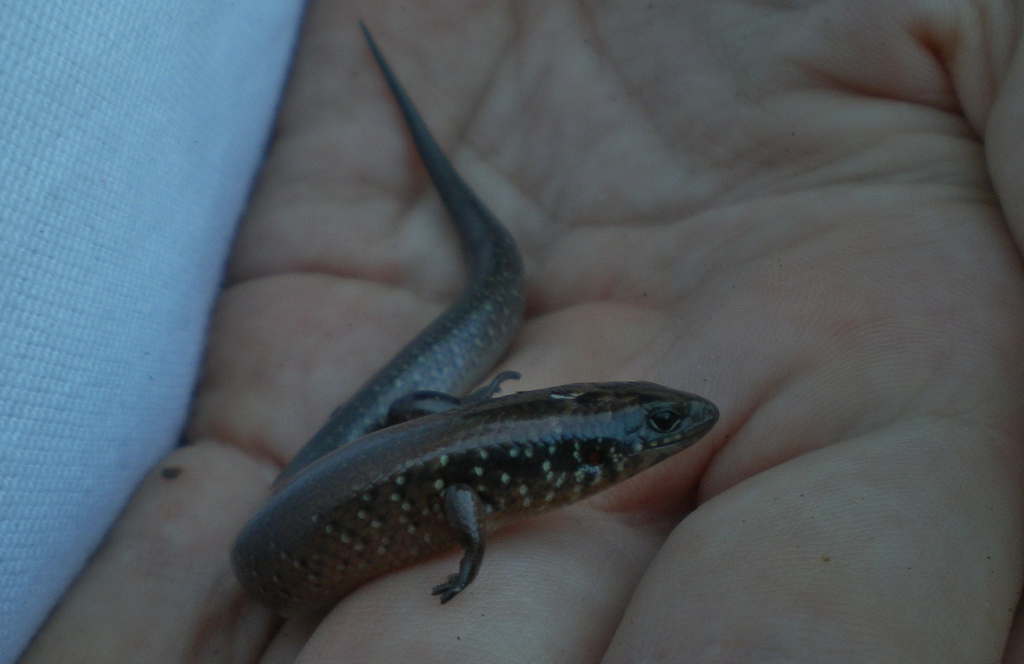
Small juvenile A. chinensis found at Lions Nature Education Center, Hong Kong.

The Chinese short-limbed skink has an elongated body, with a snout-vent length of 70–80 mm in females and 82-83.8 mm in males. The tail is longer than the body, but tends to be shorter in individuals with regenerated tails. This lizard has short, pentadactyl limbs, with the fingers and toes being widely separated when adpressed. The snout is short and obtuse. The animal has a brownish color with a cream or yellowish white underside, and black and white spots on its flanks.

== Distribution and habitat ==
This skink is endemic to Vietnam and southern and central China. In Vietnam, it was originally known only from Mau Son Mountains, Lạng Sơn province, but has also since been found in secondary forests in Bắc Giang province and Hà Giang province. In China, it has been found in Fujian, Guangdong, Guizhou, Hong Kong, Hainan and Nan'ao Island. It is a terrestrial animal which lives among leaf litter on the floor of secondary forests and mixed forests of bamboo and wooden trees.

== Behavior ==
=== Diet ===
The Chinese short-limbed skink is insectivorous. Remains of an acridid grasshopper were found within a female skink collected at Huanghua Shan Reservoir, Nan'ao Island, and a male collected at the same location contained orthopteran eggs.

=== Reproduction ===
This skink is oviparous, laying several eggs per clutch. It is hypothesized to spend the monsoonal season yolking up eggs which hatch late in the season, and if so, females probably do not lay eggs until reaching around 23 months of age. In Vietnam, the species probably lays eggs from June to September, during the rainy season.

== Research ==
The complete mitochondrial DNA of the Chinese short-limbed skink has been determined via next-generation sequencing, extracted from the muscle tissue of a specimen captured in Mingxi County. The length of the complete mtDNA was 16,840 bp, containing 13 PCGs, 22 tRNA genes, 2 rRNA genes, and a control region (D-loop).
