= Hebius ishigakiensis =

Conservation status
- Near Threatened (IUCN 3.1)

Scientific classification
- Kingdom: Animalia
- Phylum: Chordata
- Class: Reptilia
- Order: Squamata
- Suborder: Serpentes
- Family: Colubridae
- Genus: Hebius
- Species: H. ishigakiensis

Binomial name
- Hebius ishigakiensis (Malnate & Munsterman, 1960)

Synonyms
- Natrix pryeri ishigakiensis Malnate & Munsterman, 1960

Species of snake

Hebius ishigakiensis, the Yaeyama keelback, is a species of snake of the family Colubridae. The snake is endemic to Ishigaki and Iriomote in the Yaeyama Islands of southernmost Japan.

== Description ==
The holotype is an adult male measuring 93 cm (36.6 in) in total length. The tail makes 27% of the total length. Hatchlings measure about 17 cm (6.7 in).

== Habitat and ecology ==
Hebius ishigakiensis is an uncommon snake that inhabits rivers, paddy fields, and wetlands in both plains and mountain areas. It mainly feeds on frogs and lizards.

== See also ==
- List of reptiles of Japan
