= Euprepiophis perlaceus =

Conservation status
- Endangered (IUCN 3.1)

Scientific classification
- Kingdom: Animalia
- Phylum: Chordata
- Class: Reptilia
- Order: Squamata
- Suborder: Serpentes
- Family: Colubridae
- Genus: Euprepiophis
- Species: E. perlaceus

Binomial name
- Euprepiophis perlaceus (Stejneger, 1929)

Synonyms
- Elaphe perlacea Stejneger, 1929

Species of snake

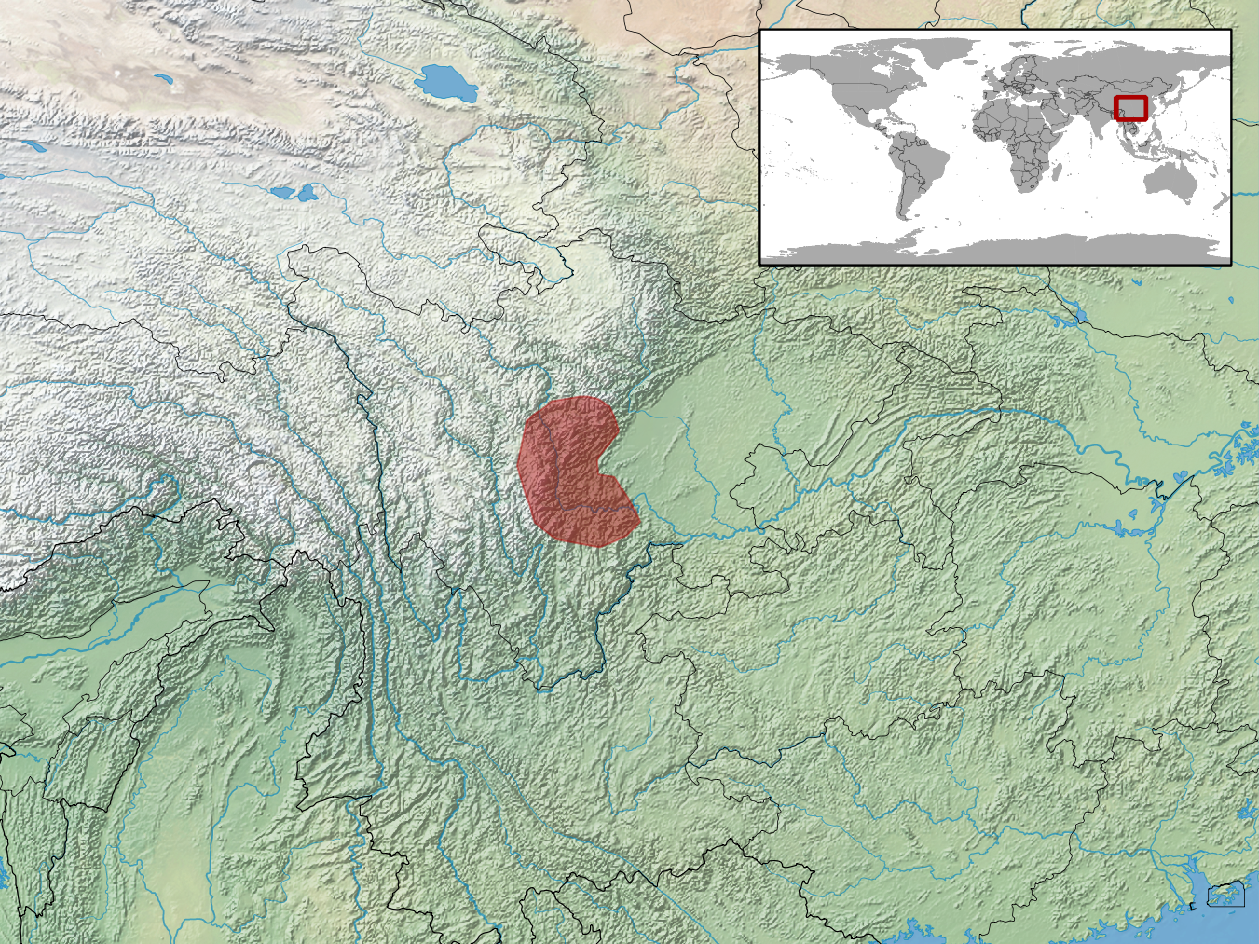
Geographic distribution of Euprepiophis perlacea (Native: China (Sichuan))

Euprepiophis perlaceus, also known as Sichuan rat snake or pearl-banded rat snake, is a species of snake in the family Colubridae snake. It is endemic to western Sichuan Province in China. This snake is designated as Endangered by the IUCN Red List. It is found in the Palearctic.

It is one of three species of Asian rat snakes which were formerly assigned to the genus Elaphe. They were separated from Elaphe in 2002 by Utiger et al. following evidence from DNA analysis. It is a true rat snake but it is not as closely related to other northern-hemisphere rat snakes as its former place in Elaphe would suggest.
