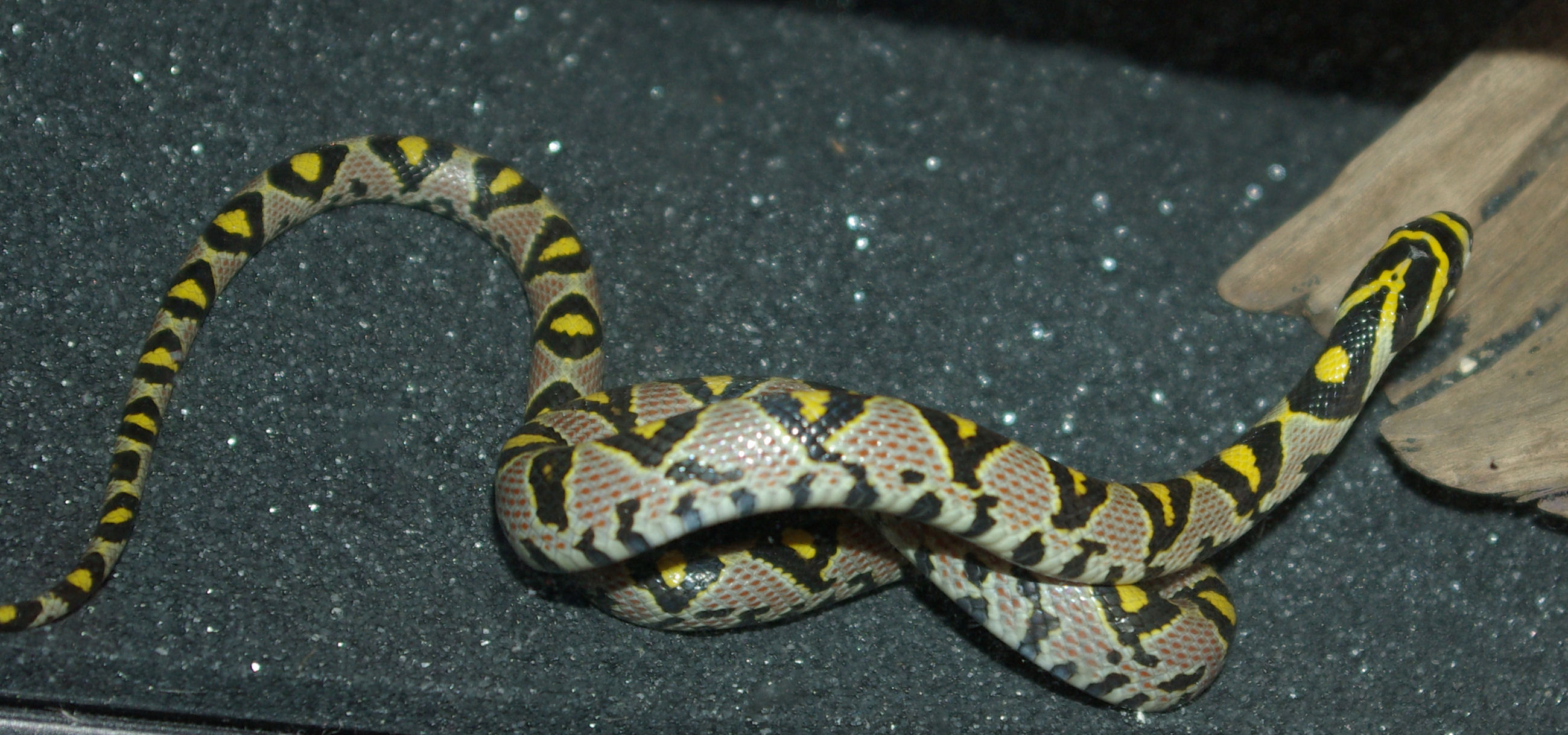

Conservation status
- Least Concern (IUCN 3.1)

Scientific classification
- Kingdom: Animalia
- Phylum: Chordata
- Class: Reptilia
- Order: Squamata
- Suborder: Serpentes
- Family: Colubridae
- Genus: Euprepiophis
- Species: E. mandarinus

Binomial name
- Euprepiophis mandarinus (Cantor, 1842)
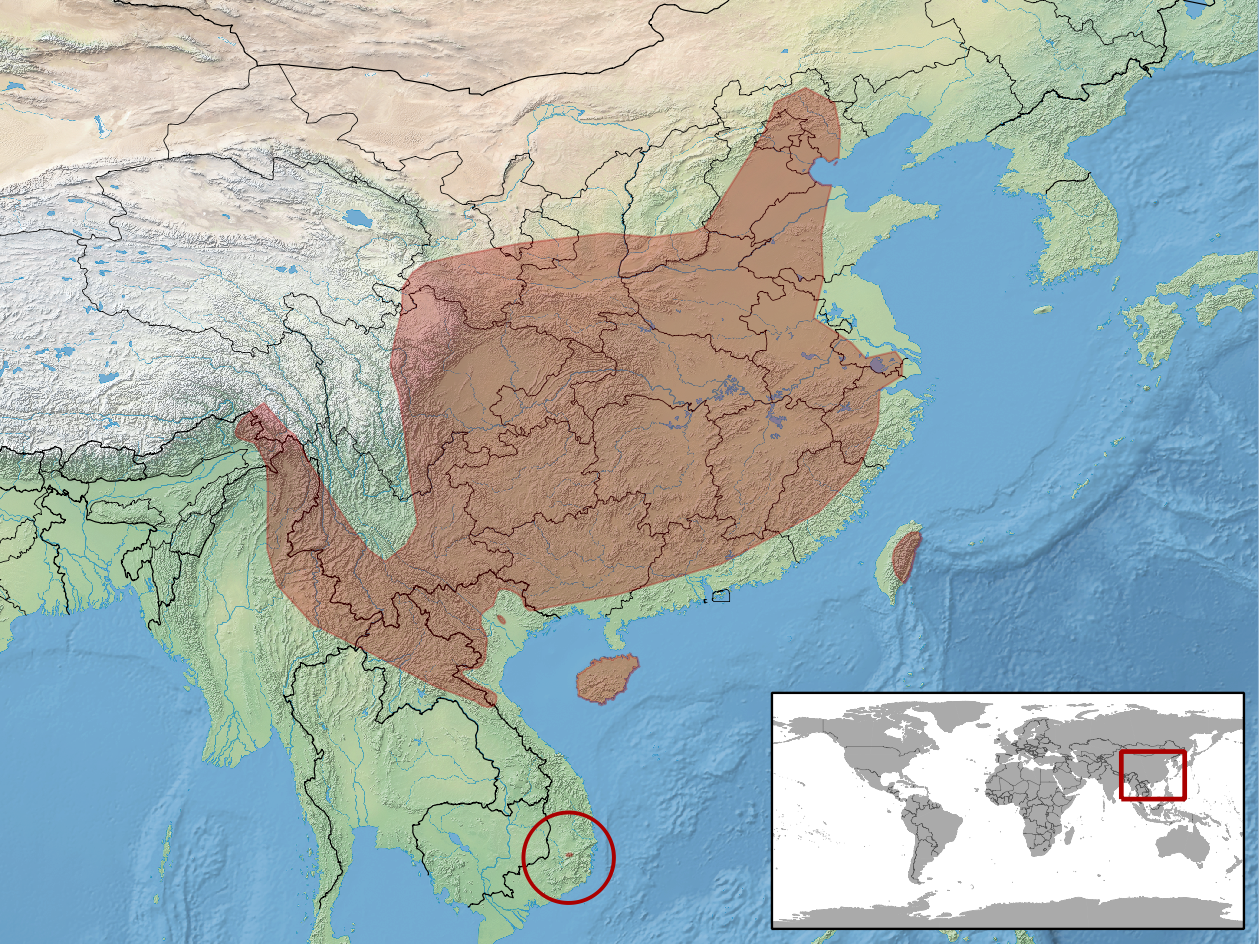

Synonyms
- Coluber mandarinus Cantor, 1842; Ablabes pavo Annandale, 1912; Elaphe mandarinus — Stejneger, 1925; Elaphe takasago Takahashi, 1930; Holarchus roulei Angel & Bourret, 1933; Elaphe mandarina — M.A. Smith, 1943; Euprepiophis mandarinus — Utiger et al., 2002; Euprepiophis mandarinus — Gumprecht, 2003

= Mandarin rat snake =

Species of snake

The mandarin rat snake (Euprepiophis mandarinus) is a species of non venomous colubrid snake endemic to Asia. It is closely related to Euprepiophis conspicillata, the Japanese forest rat snake. Mandarin rat snakes are one of the most popular rat snakes found in the pet trade.

== Description ==
The mandarin rat snake is identified by its grey body and diamond-shaped black and yellow markings along its back. It is a relatively small rat snake; their adult size is no more than 1.4 m (4 ft 7 in) in total length (body + tail).

== Distribution ==
India (Arunachal Pradesh), Myanmar, Laos, Vietnam, Taiwan, China (Anhui, Beijing, Chongqing, Fujian, Gansu, Guangdong, Guangxi, Guizhou, Hainan, Hebei, Henan, Hubei, Hunan, Jiangsu, Jiangxi, Liaoning, Shaanxi, Shanghai, Shanxi, Sichuan, Tianjin, Tibet, Yunnan, Zhejiang)

Type locality: China: Chekiang, Chusan island (modern transliteration: Zhejiang, Zhoushan) (Cantor, 1842).

== Taxonomy ==
In recent years there has been some taxonomic controversy over the genera of rat snakes. Based on mitochondrial DNA, Utiger et al. (2002) argued for a splintering of the genus Elaphe and suggested a reworking of the genera.

== Natural history ==
The mandarin rat snake is a secretive species, often using rodent burrows for shelter. It feeds primarily on small rodents, prefers cooler temperatures, and is predominantly crepuscular. It occurs from sea level to at least 3,000 m (9,800 ft).
