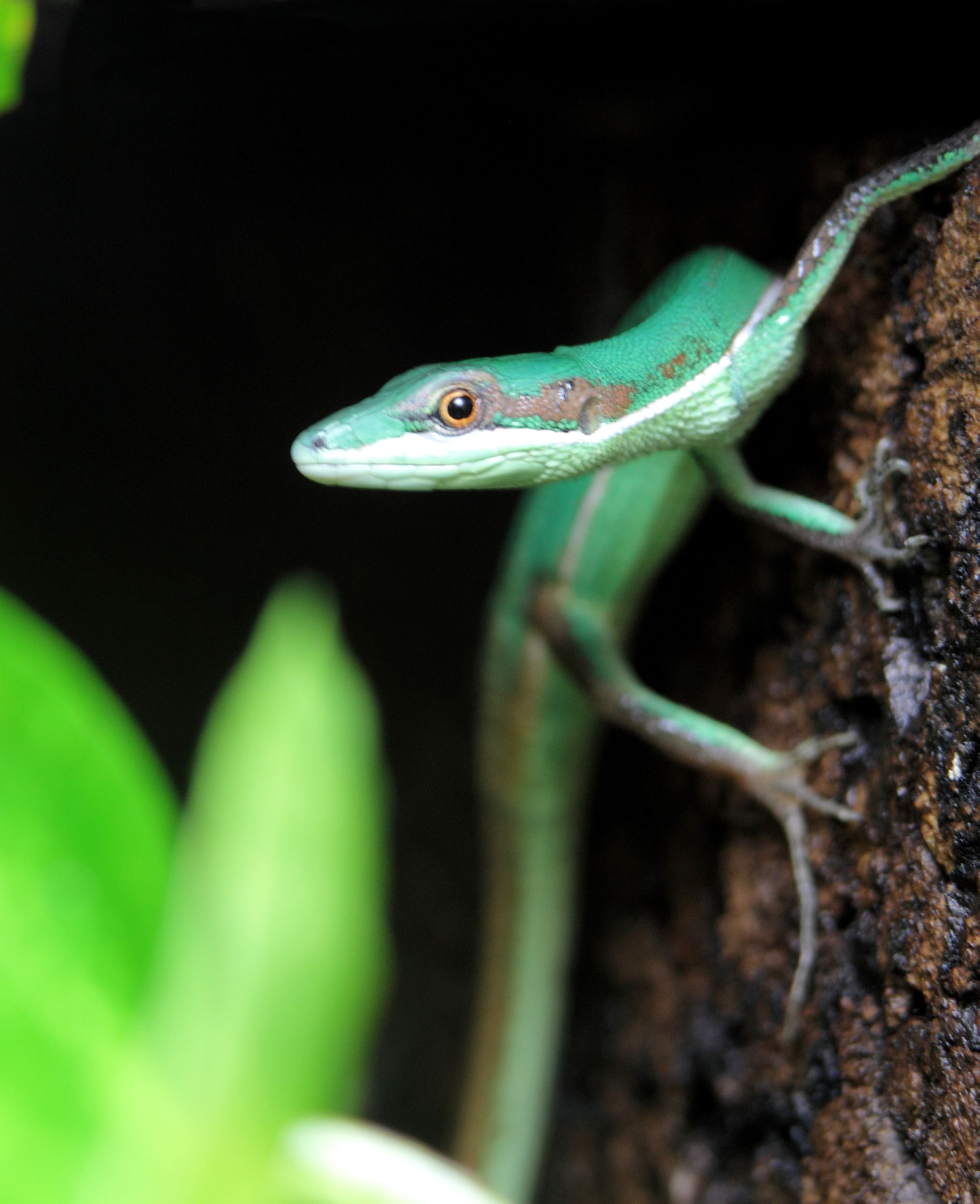

Conservation status
- Near Threatened (IUCN 3.1)

Scientific classification
- Kingdom: Animalia
- Phylum: Chordata
- Class: Reptilia
- Order: Squamata
- Suborder: Lacertoidea
- Family: Lacertidae
- Genus: Takydromus
- Species: T. smaragdinus

Binomial name
- Takydromus smaragdinus Boulenger, 1887

= Takydromus smaragdinus =

Species of lizard

Takydromus smaragdinus, the green grass lizard, is a species of lizard in the family Lacertidae.

== Geographic range ==
It is endemic to the Ryukyu Islands in southern Japan, including the Tokara Islands Takarajima and Kodakarajima, the Amami Islands and Okinawa Islands. The area of occupancy of all the islands combined is around 2600 km^{2}.

== Activity ==
Takydromus smaragdinus is diurnal. It preys on insects and spiders.

== Reproduction ==
The females lay several clutches of eggs in April to August with two eggs per clutch. The eggs hatch after about a month. The juveniles are left without parental care and reach maturity in a year.

== Threats ==
The IUCN lists the species as near threatened due to invasive weasels and mongooses that have led to a decline in some subpopulations.
