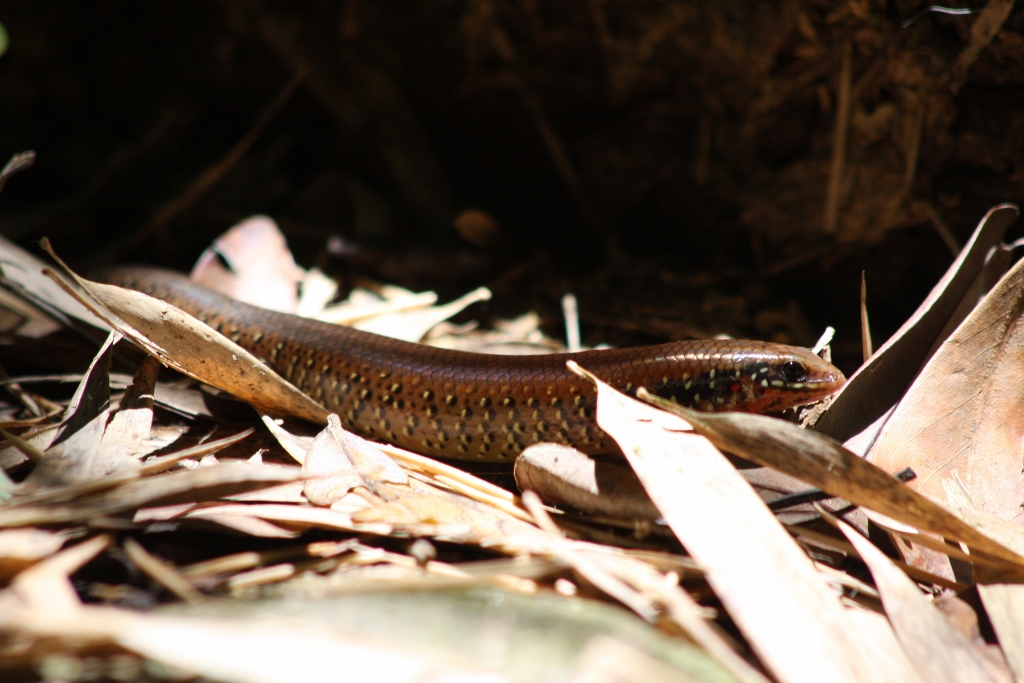
- Ateuchosaurus chinensis

Scientific classification
- Kingdom: Animalia
- Phylum: Chordata
- Class: Reptilia
- Order: Squamata
- Family: Scincidae
- Subfamily: Scincinae
- Genus: Ateuchosaurus; Gray, 1845

Species
- Three, see text.

= Ateuchosaurus =

Genus of lizards

Ateuchosaurus is a genus of skinks, lizards in the family Scincidae. The genus contains only two species which are indigenous to East Asia and Southeast Asia.

== Taxonomy ==
The genus Ateuchosaurus is usually placed in the subfamily Scincinae. This group seems to be paraphyletic however, and the present genus is apparently not closely related to most or all of them. Different molecular studies find Ateuchosarus to instead to be more closely related either to Acontias or to lygosomine skinks, and it is therefore sometimes considered to represent a distinct family or subfamily.

== Species ==
The following species are recognized as being valid.

- Ateuchosaurus chinensis Gray, 1845 – Chinese short-limbed skink, Chinese ateuchosaurus
- Ateuchosaurus okinavensis (Thompson, J.C. 1912) – Ryukyu short-legged skink
- Ateuchosaurus pellopleurus (Hallowell, 1861) – Ryukyu short-legged skink

Nota bene: A binomial authority in parentheses indicates that the species was originally described in a genus other than Ateuchosaurus.
