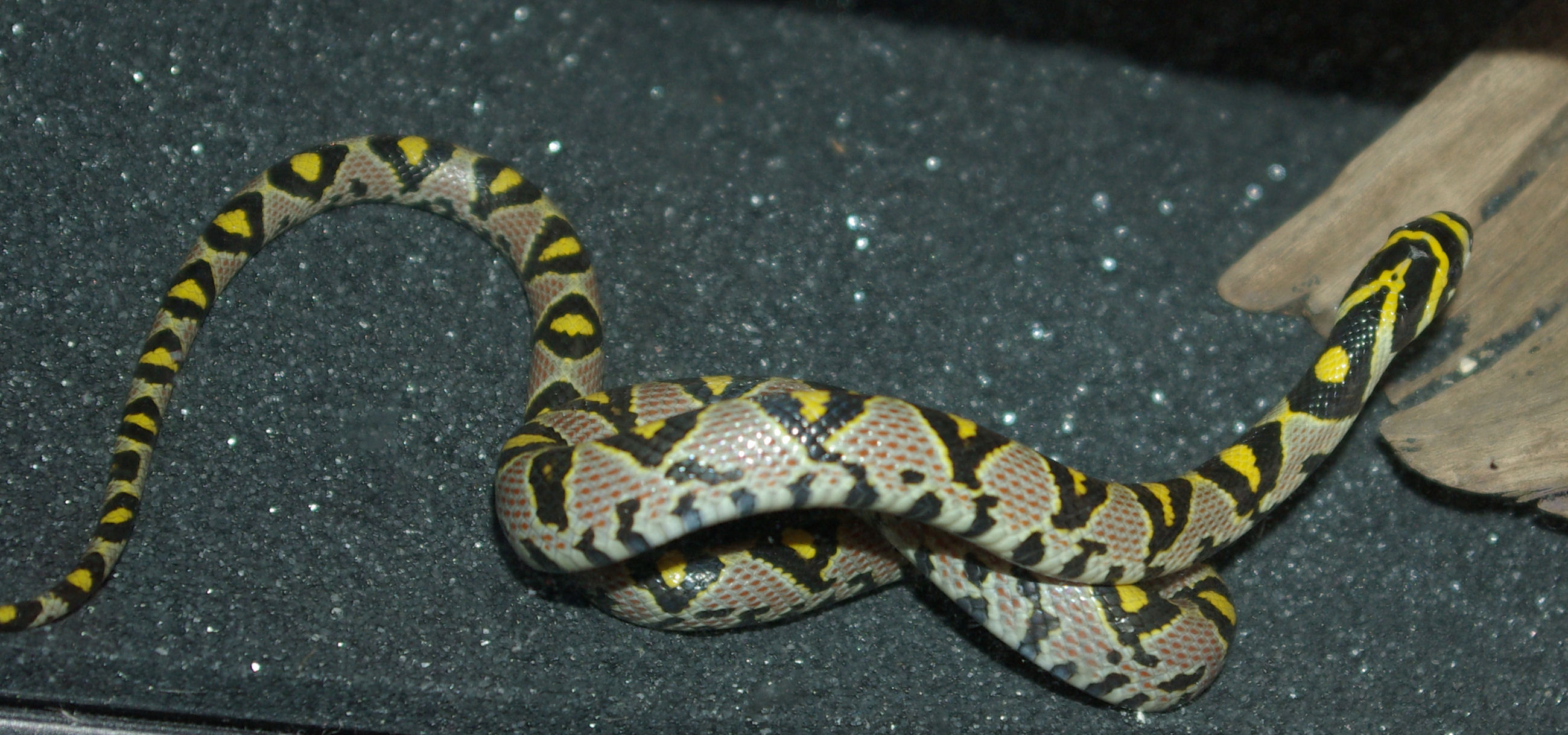
- Euprepiophis mandarinus in a terrarium

Scientific classification
- Domain: Eukaryota
- Kingdom: Animalia
- Phylum: Chordata
- Class: Reptilia
- Order: Squamata
- Suborder: Serpentes
- Family: Colubridae
- Subfamily: Colubrinae
- Genus: Euprepiophis; Fitzinger, 1843

Species
- See text

= Euprepiophis =

Genus of snakes

Euprepiophis is a genus of nonvenomous colubrid snakes, containing three species of Asian rat snakes which were formerly assigned to the genus Elaphe. They were separated from Elaphe in 2002 by Utiger et al. following evidence from DNA analysis. They are true rat snakes but are not as closely related to other European, Asian, or North American rat snakes as their former place in Elaphe might suggest.

== Species ==
- Euprepiophis conspicillata (H. Boie, 1826) - Japanese forest rat snake
- Euprepiophis mandarinus (Cantor, 1842) - Mandarin rat snake
- Euprepiophis perlaceus (Stejneger, 1929) - Szechwan rat snake
