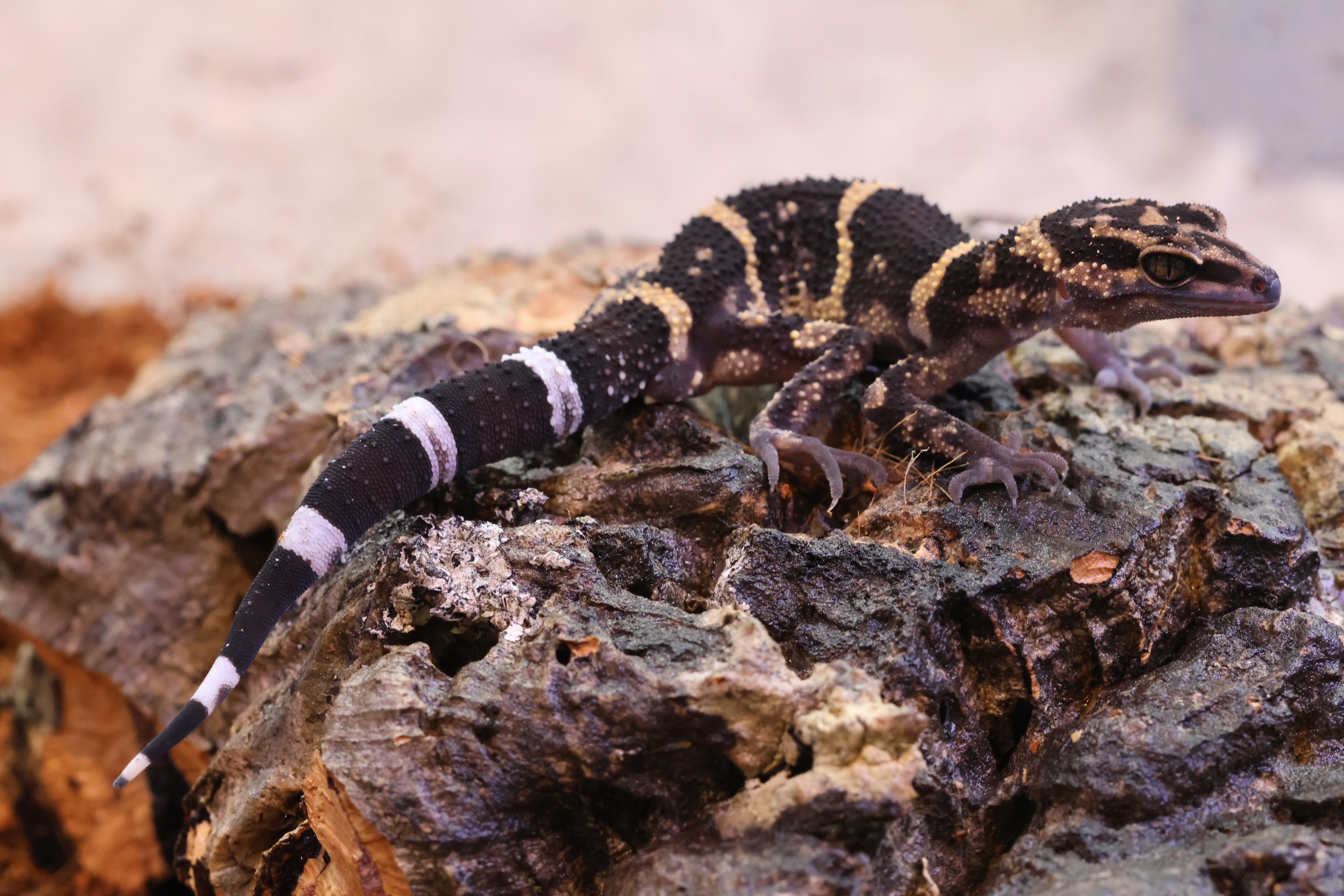

Conservation status
- Critically Endangered (IUCN 3.1)

Scientific classification
- Kingdom: Animalia
- Phylum: Chordata
- Class: Reptilia
- Order: Squamata
- Suborder: Gekkota
- Family: Eublepharidae
- Genus: Goniurosaurus
- Species: G. yamashinae

Binomial name
- Goniurosaurus yamashinae (Okada, 1936)

Synonyms
- Gymnodactylus yamashinae; Amamisaurus kuroiwae yamashinae; Goniurosaurus kuroiwae yamashinae

= Yamashina's ground gecko =

Species of lizard

Yamashina's ground gecko (Goniurosaurus yamashinae) is a species of gecko. It is endemic to Kume Island in the Ryukyu Islands of Japan.
