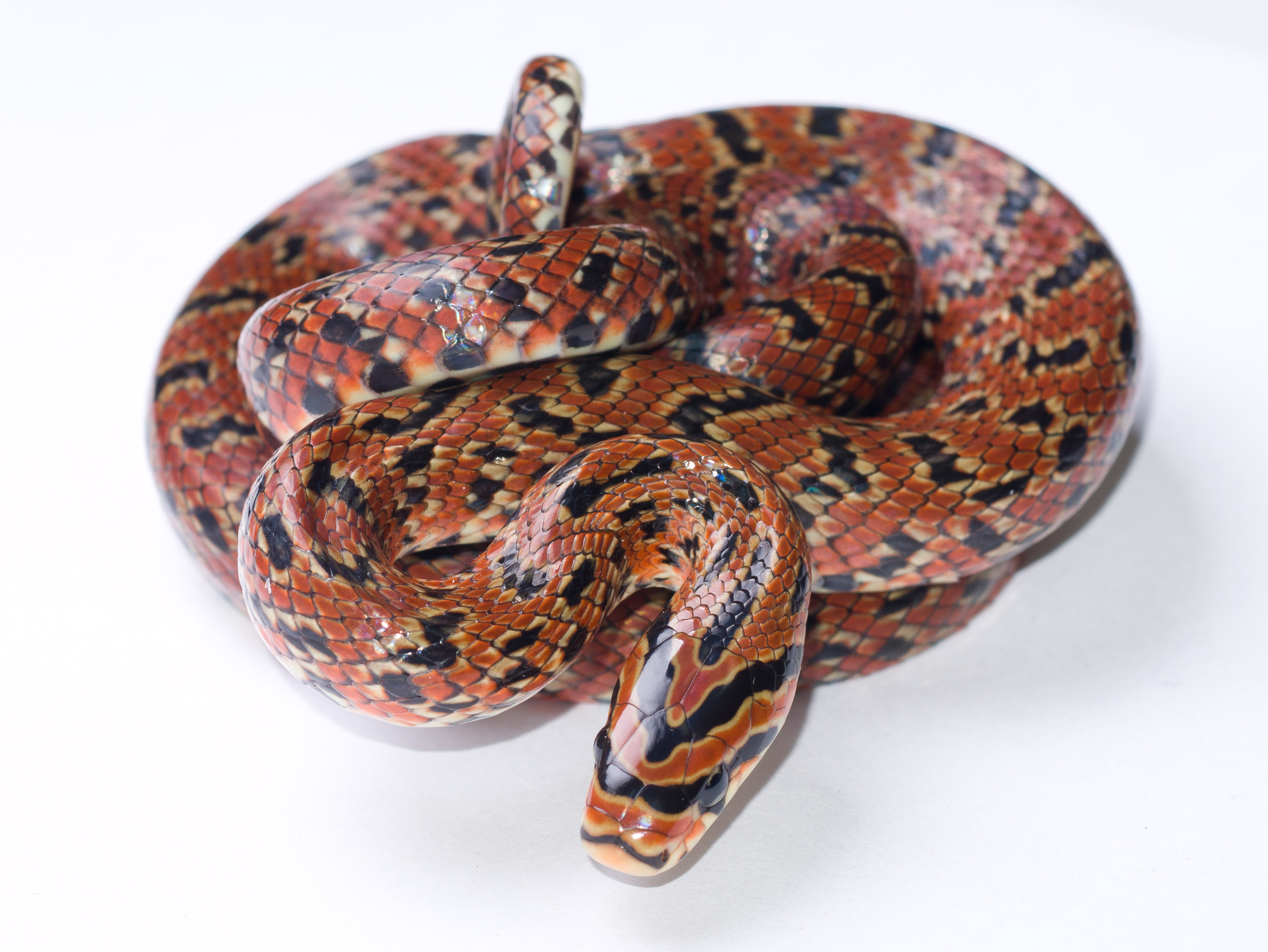

Conservation status
- Least Concern (IUCN 3.1)

Scientific classification
- Kingdom: Animalia
- Phylum: Chordata
- Class: Reptilia
- Order: Squamata
- Suborder: Serpentes
- Family: Colubridae
- Genus: Euprepiophis
- Species: E. conspicillata

Binomial name
- Euprepiophis conspicillata (H. Boie, 1826)

Synonyms
- Coluber conspicillatus H. Boie, 1826; Elaphis conspicillatus — A.M.C. Duméril, Bibron & A.H.A. Duméril, 1854; Proterodon conspicillatus — Hallowell, 1860; Coronella conspicillata — Jan, 1865; Callopeltis conspicillatus — Giglioli, 1887; Coluber conspicillatus — Boulenger, 1894; Elaphe conspicillata — Stejneger, 1907; Euprepiophis conspicillatus — Utiger et al., 2002

= Euprepiophis conspicillata =

Species of snake

Euprepiophis conspicillata, commonly known as the Japanese forest rat snake, is a species of nonvenomous colubrid snake endemic to Japan. Its Japanese common name, jimuguri, roughly translates to "the burrower". It is closely related to Euprepiophis mandarinus, the Mandarin rat snake.

== Geographic range ==
Euprepiophis conspicillata is native to all four main islands of Japan, including some smaller outlying islands, as well as Kunashir Island (territory disputed between Japan and Russia).

== Description ==
Adults are usually 70 to 100 cm (2.3 to 3.3 ft) in total length (body + tail).

== Taxonomy ==
In recent years there has been some taxonomic controversy over the genera of rat snakes. Based on mitochondrial DNA, Utiger et al. (2002) argued for a splintering of the genus Elaphe and suggested a reworking of the genera.

However, all published taxonomy remains a taxonomic suggestion until ruled on by the International Commission on Zoological Nomenclature (ICZN - https://www.iczn.org/), but that body has so far not supported the change and has not addressed the taxonomic suggestion. Thus the official taxonomy remains Elaphe.

== Natural history ==
The Japanese forest rat snake can be found surface active at any hour, but they most often show crepuscular activity patterns. It may completely cease surface activity from mid-late summer when conditions become too hot and/or dry. Principal prey items are small rodents, and the snakes often use the rodent burrows for shelter.

As the Japanese common name suggests, this species is fossorial, and is normally associated with forested areas. Occurs from sea level to at least 3,000 m (9,800 ft).
