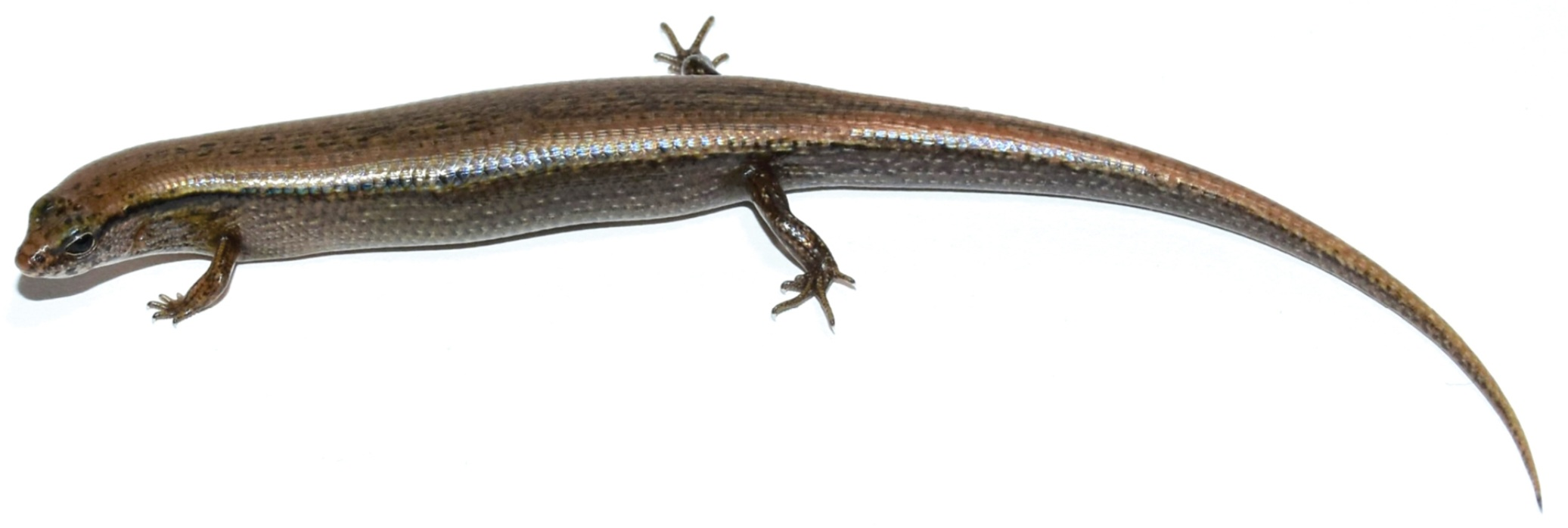
- Live individual from Urasoe, Okinawa

Scientific classification
- Kingdom: Animalia
- Phylum: Chordata
- Class: Reptilia
- Order: Squamata
- Family: Scincidae
- Genus: Ateuchosaurus
- Species: A. okinavensis

Binomial name
- Ateuchosaurus okinavensis (Thompson, 1912)

Synonyms
- Lygosoma okinavensis Thompson, 1912

= Ateuchosaurus okinavensis =

Species of lizard

Ateuchosaurus okinavensis, the Ryukyu short-legged skink, is a species of skink. It is found in the Okinawa Islands of the Ryukyu Archipelago, Japan.

== Taxonomy ==
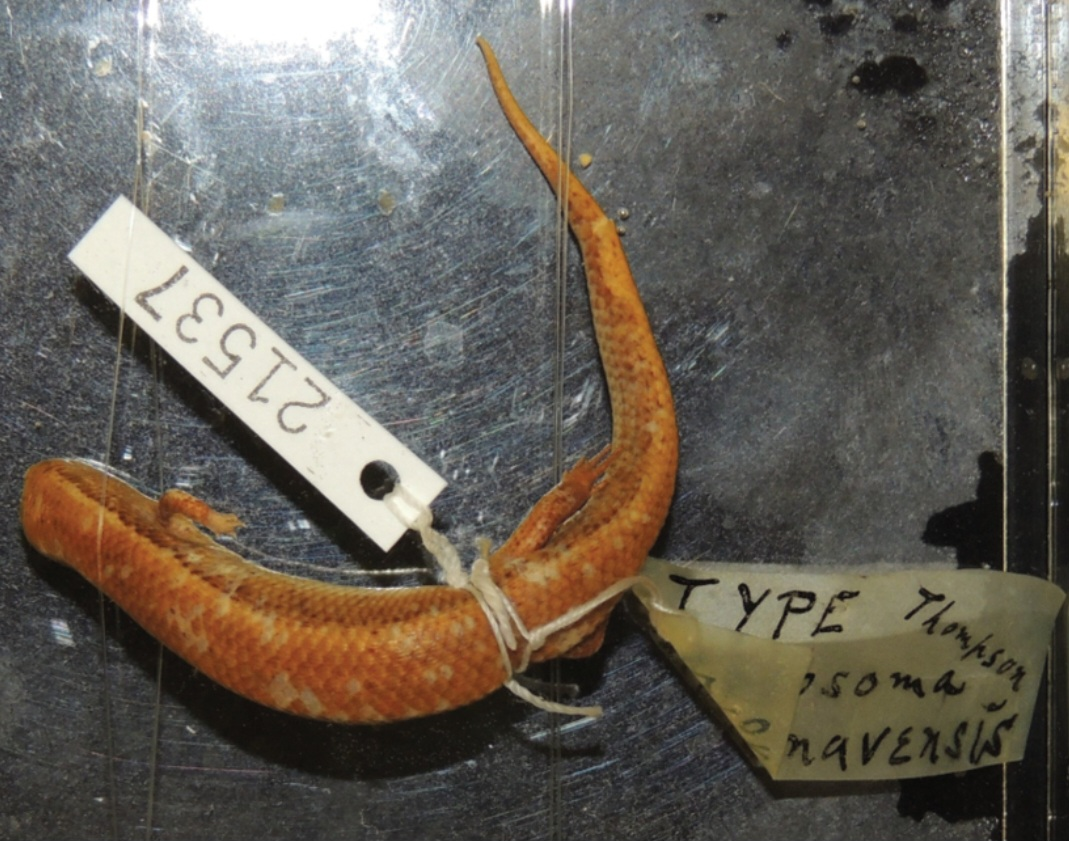
Dorsal view of the holotype

This species was originally described as Lygosoma okinavensis in 1912, with the holotype (CAS 21537) being collected from Nago, Okinawajima Island. In 1939 it was synonymized with Ateuchosaurus pellopleurus, and A. pellopleurus sensu lato was thought to range across the Ryukyu Islands. However, a 2023 molecular study found that the skinks in the Osumi and Amami groups are distinct from those in the Okinawa group. Thus, the name A. okinavensis was resurrected for the species in the Okinawa group, whilst A. pellopleurus sensu stricto is now the name for the species in the Osumi and Amami groups.

== Distribution and habitat ==
A. okinavensis is endemic to the Okinawa Islands, where it is found in the leaf litter of forest floors and grasslands. It is seen primarily in the daytime, though can sometimes also be seen at night. The congeneric A. pellopleurus occurs in similar habitats on Osumi, Tokara and Amami groups, where A. okinavensis is absent.

A skeletal remain of an Ateuchosaurus skink, likely dating from the late 19th century, has been found on Yoronjima Island. Though originally reported as A. pellopleurus, this identification occurred when the two Japanese Ateuchosaurus species were synonymized, and it is currently unclear if this specimen represents A. pellopleurus or A. okinavensis as Yoronjima is outside the current range of either species.
