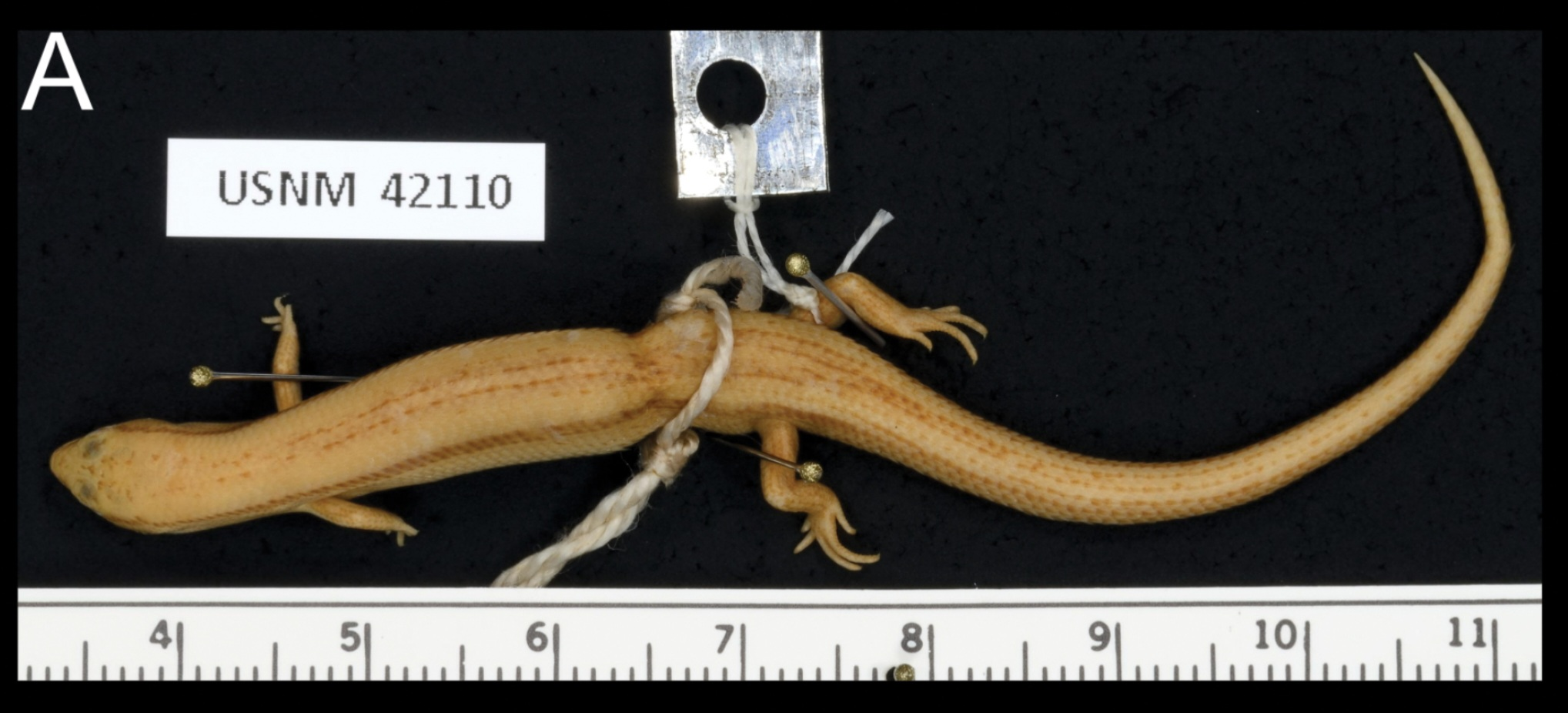
- Lectotype of A. pellopleurus

Conservation status
- Least Concern (IUCN 3.1)

Scientific classification
- Kingdom: Animalia
- Phylum: Chordata
- Class: Reptilia
- Order: Squamata
- Family: Scincidae
- Genus: Ateuchosaurus
- Species: A. pellopleurus

Binomial name
- Ateuchosaurus pellopleurus (Hallowell, 1861)

= Ateuchosaurus pellopleurus =

Ryukyu short-legged skink

Species of lizard

Ateuchosaurus pellopleurus, the Ryukyu short-legged skink, is a species of skink. It is found in the Ryukyu Islands of Japan.

== Taxonomy ==
Whilst A. pellopleurus was originally recognized as a single species ranging across the Osumi, Tokara, Amami, and Okinawa Groups of the Ryukyu Archipelago, molecular analysis has found that the skinks in the Osumi and Amami groups are distinct from those in the Okinawa group. A. pellopleurus sensu stricto is now the name for the species in the Osumi and Amami groups, whilst A. okinavensis is resurrected for the species in the Okinawa group.

== Distribution and habitat ==
This species is found in the leaf litter of forest floors and grasslands, including small vegetation around urban areas. It occurs on Mishima of the Osumi Group, and the Tokara and Amami Groups of the Ryukyu Archipelago. The congeneric species Ateuchosaurus okinavensis is present in the Okinawa group, where A. pellopleurus is absent. A skeletal remain, likely dating from the late 19th century, has been found on Yoronjima Island, but it is unclear if this represents A. pellopleurus or A. okinavensis as Yoronjima is outside the current range of either species.

== Threats ==
On Iojima Island, the local population is preyed upon by the introduced Indian peafowl.
