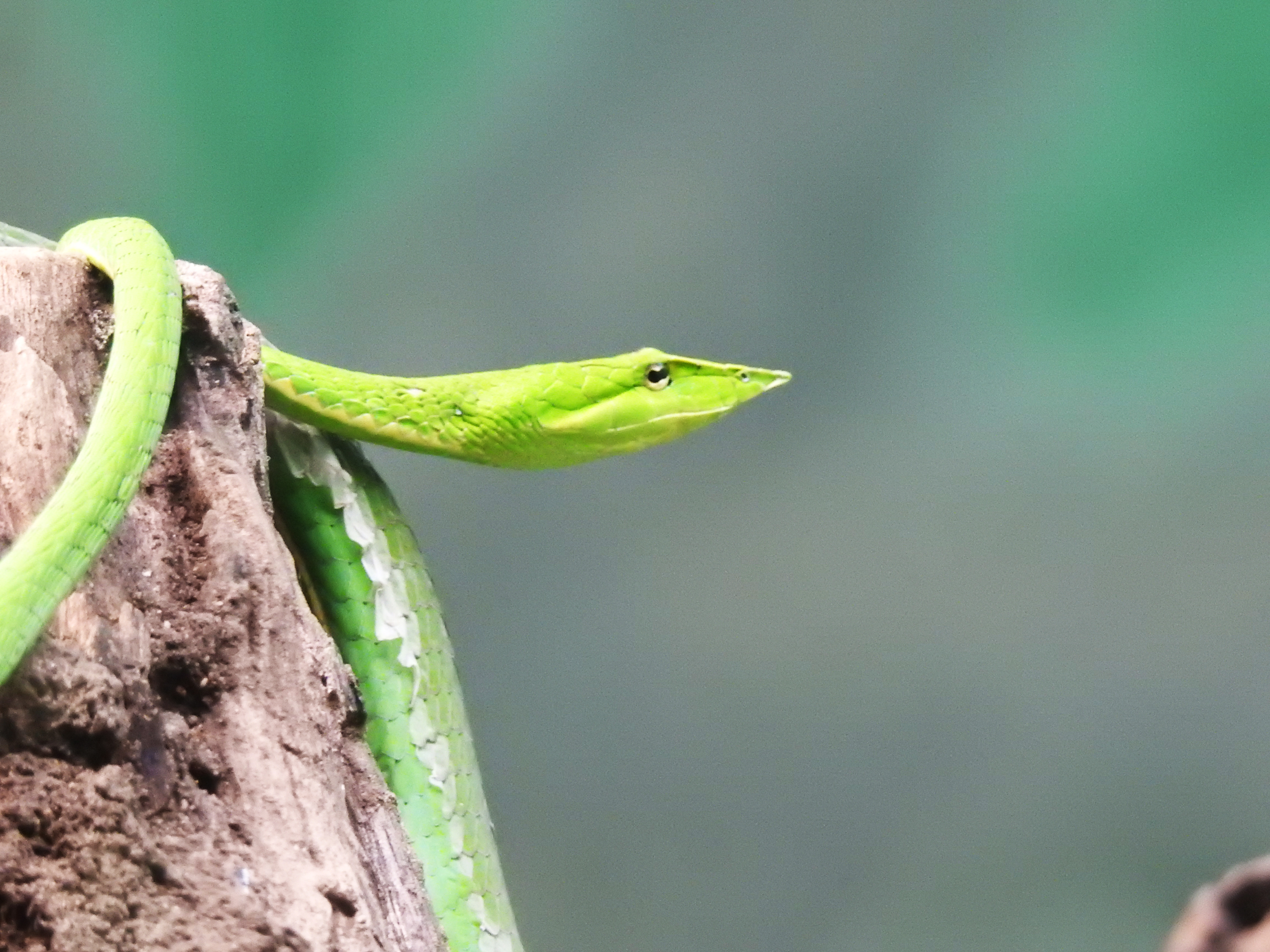
- At Nehru Zoological Park, Hyderabad

Scientific classification
- Kingdom: Animalia
- Phylum: Chordata
- Class: Reptilia
- Order: Squamata
- Suborder: Serpentes
- Family: Colubridae
- Subfamily: Ahaetuliinae
- Genus: Ahaetulla
- Species: A. oxyrhyncha

Binomial name
- Ahaetulla oxyrhyncha (Bell, 1825)

= Ahaetulla oxyrhyncha =

Indian or Long-nosed vine snake

Species of snake

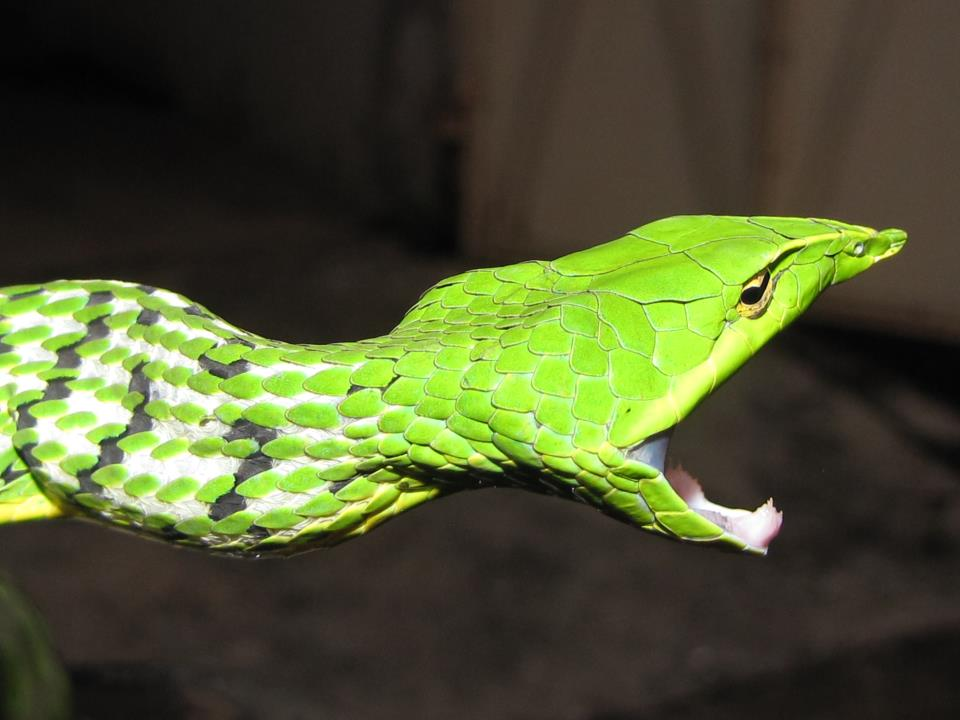
Ahaetulla oxyrhyncha, Ezhimala, Kerala, India. Note the distinct black and white interstices.

The Indian vine snake or long-nosed vine snake (Ahaetulla oxyrhyncha) is a species of diurnal, mildly venomous, arboreal snake distributed in the lowlands of peninsular India.Often mistakenly believed to peck out peoples' eyes, this misconception has led to widespread wanton killing of this species.

== Description ==
A thin and slender-bodied snake that is usually bright grassy green in colour. A pair of white lines extend throughout its body length demarcating the back and under belly parts. Adults reach over 5 feet (1.5 m) in length. They have unique horizontal pupil in the eye. Formerly misclassified as A. nasuta, A. oxyrhyncha is actually a much larger-bodied species that also has a much longer snout. Indian green vine snakes (genus Ahaetulla) are strongly arboreal, meaning they live in trees and bushes, using their slender bodies and camouflage to mimic branches for hunting lizards and frogs and avoiding predators. They are diurnal (active during the day) and rely on their perfect camouflage and binocular vision for hunting in foliage.

== Venrnacular Languauge ==
In Telugu, it is known as pasarika pamu

== Geographic range ==
This species is distributed throughout the drier plains and low hilly tracts of Peninsular India, except the Western Ghats rainforest.

== Habitat ==
It is found in many types of vegetation including arid to semi-arid habitats and in dry deciduous forests, as well as open areas such as scrub forests, coastal forests, and Indian savannah. This species has been often sighted in and around human habitations in villages and countrysides and even in some city Parks.

== Taxonomy ==
It was described as a distinct species in 1825 based on drawings of snakes from Vishakapatnam, but later considered as same species and confused with A. nasuta, that is only endemic to Sri Lanka. A 2020 study found A. nasuta to be a species complex of A. nasuta sensu stricto and several species endemic to the Western Ghats (A. borealis, A. farnsworthi, A. isabellina, and A. malabarica).

=== Venom ===
The snake is mildly venomous. Bites from this species produce a moderate reaction in humans, causing localized pain, swelling, bruising, and numbness that typically resolves within three days. Bites typically do not require medical attention, but some cases involving bites near vital organs could be more severe
