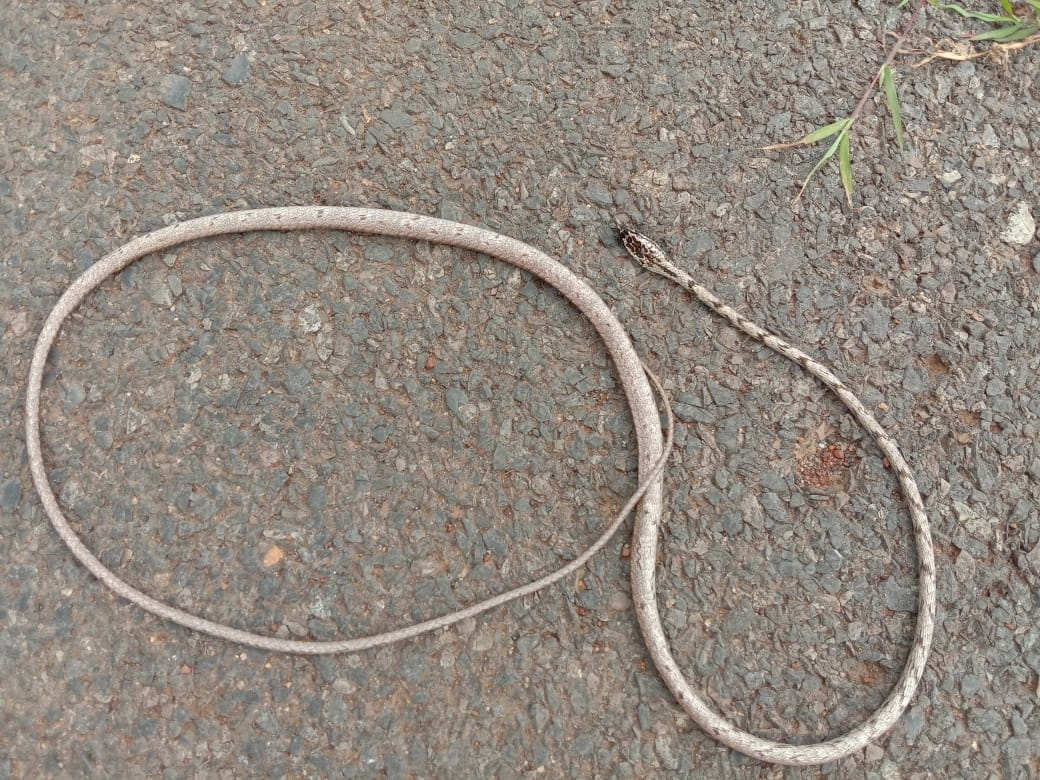

Conservation status
- Least Concern (IUCN 3.1)

Scientific classification
- Kingdom: Animalia
- Phylum: Chordata
- Class: Reptilia
- Order: Squamata
- Suborder: Serpentes
- Family: Colubridae
- Subfamily: Ahaetuliinae
- Genus: Ahaetulla
- Species: A. anomala

Binomial name
- Ahaetulla anomala (Annandale, 1906)

= Ahaetulla anomala =

Species of snake

The variable colored vine snake (Ahaetulla anomala) is a species of opisthoglyphous (rear-fanged venomous) colubrid vine snake found in Bangladesh and India. It is the first reported sexually dichromatic snake from the Indian Subcontinent, and until 2017 was formerly regarded as a subspecies of the green vine snake, Ahaetulla nasuta.

== Taxonomy ==
This snake was first described by Thomas Nelson Annandale (the first director of the Zoological Survey of India) in 1906. It was later considered a subspecies of Ahaetulla nasuta in 1943. There has long been taxonomic confusion due to the sexually dimorphic coloring of species, with the green males resembling the long-nosed whip snake (Ahaetulla nasuta), while females are brown in color and physically resemble the brown-speckled whipsnake (Ahaetulla pulverulenta). To resolve this confusion, in 2017, a team of biologists conducted a molecular and morphological study of the snake, ultimately finding it to be a distinct species, closely related to its sister taxon Ahaetulla pulverulenta, as shown in the cladogram below (with possible paraphyletic species noted):

- Ahaetuliinae
  - sharp‑nosed snakes
    - - Ahaetulla
        - - - - - Ahaetulla prasina (paraphyletic)
                - Ahaetulla fasciolata
              - Ahaetulla prasina (paraphyletic)
            - - Ahaetulla prasina (paraphyletic)
              - Ahaetulla mycterizans
          - Ahaetulla prasina (paraphyletic)
        - - - - - Ahaetulla anomala
                - Ahaetulla pulverulenta
              - Ahaetulla nasuta (paraphyletic)
            - Ahaetulla nasuta (paraphyletic)
          - Ahaetulla fronticincta
      - Proahaetulla antiqua
    - Dryophiops
  - broad‑nosed snakes
    - Dendrelaphis
    - Chrysopelea

The status of Ahaetulla anomala as a separate species is still in dispute, as a 2020 study found A. anomala to be possibly conspecific with Ahaetulla oxyrhyncha.

== Distribution ==
It is limited to India (Odisha, West Bengal, Jharkhand, Bihar) and Bangladesh.

== Description ==
This species is sexually dichromatic, with the males being green, while females are brown in color. Sexual dichromatism is rare among snakes and is mostly only documented in some groups such as vipers (Bothrops), Comoran snakes (Lycodryas), and Malagasy leaf-nosed snakes (Langaha madagascariensis).

It has rear fangs typical of the Ahaetulla genus, and a long prominent appendage at the tip of its snout, covered by many small scales above, which is unique among related species. The holotype was 95.5 cm (37.6 in) long in total body length.

== Behavior ==
The snake is diurnal and arboreal, and mostly found on shrubs, trees, and bushes. It feeds primarily on lizards, and it is ovoviviparous.
