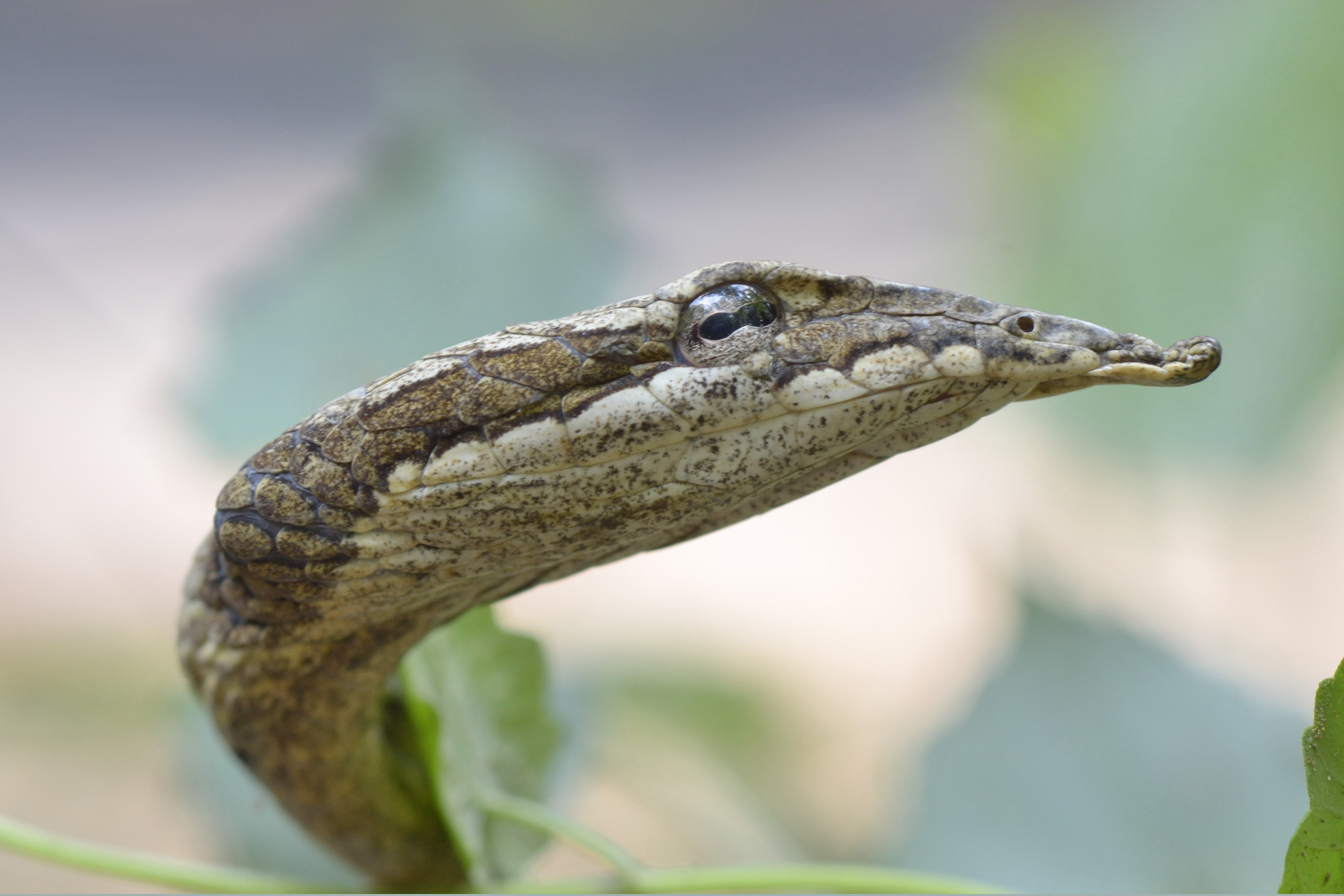
- In Kerala.

Scientific classification
- Kingdom: Animalia
- Phylum: Chordata
- Class: Reptilia
- Order: Squamata
- Suborder: Serpentes
- Family: Colubridae
- Subfamily: Ahaetuliinae
- Genus: Ahaetulla
- Species: A. sahyadrensis

Binomial name
- Ahaetulla sahyadrensis Mallik, Srikanthan, Pal, Princia D'Souza, Shanker, and Ganesh, 2020

Synonyms
- Ahaetulla pulverulenta indica, Deraniyagala, 1955

= Ahaetulla sahyadrensis =

Species of snake

Ahaetulla sahyadrensis is a species of tree snake endemic to the Western Ghats of India. It is also reported from Bangladesh.

== Taxonomy ==
It was formerly considered conspecific with A. pulverulenta (now considered to be restricted to Sri Lanka), and was described as a subspecies of it (A. p. indica) by Paulus Edward Pieris Deraniyagala in 1955. However, a 2020 study recovered it as a distinct species. In addition, a now-defunct subspecies of Ahaetulla prasina, A. p. indica, was described by Rudolf Mell in 1931. Thus, the combination Ahaetulla pulverulenta indica would be a homonym to Ahaetulla prasina indica. To solve this, a new replacement name, A. sahyadrensis, was erected in 2020.

== Geographic range ==
This species is the most widespread of all vine snakes endemic to the Western Ghats, ranging from Gujarat south to Kerala and Tamil Nadu. It is also reported from Bangladesh.

== Habitat ==
It is found in moist deciduous and evergreen forests from just above sea level up to 1500 msl. They are usually found in the vicinity of perennial streams.
