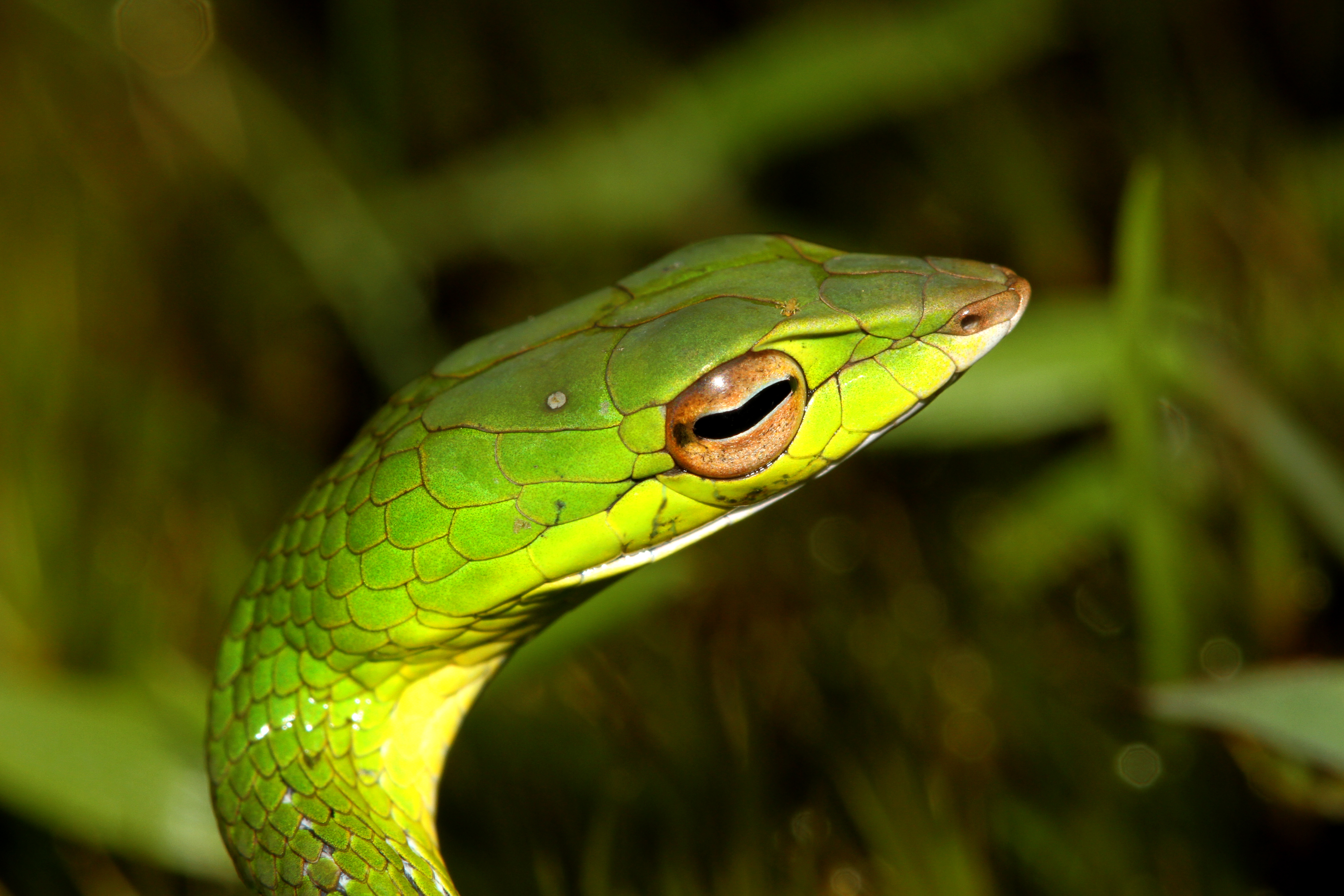
- Ahaetulla dispar

Scientific classification
- Kingdom: Animalia
- Phylum: Chordata
- Class: Reptilia
- Order: Squamata
- Suborder: Serpentes
- Family: Colubridae
- Subfamily: Ahaetuliinae
- Genus: Ahaetulla; Link, 1807

Species
- See text

= Ahaetulla =

Ahaetulla Temporal range: Oligocene-Holocene, 26.57–0 Ma

Genus of snakes

Ahaetulla, commonly referred to as Asian vine snakes or Asian whip snakes, is a genus of colubrid snakes distributed throughout tropical Asia. They are considered by some scientists to be mildly venomous and are what is commonly termed as 'rear-fanged' or more appropriately, opisthoglyphous, meaning their enlarged teeth or fangs, intended to aid in venom delivery, are located in the back of the upper jaw, instead of in the front as they are in vipers or cobras. As colubrids, Ahaetulla do not possess a true venom gland or a sophisticated venom delivery system. The Duvernoy's gland of this genus, homologous to the venom gland of true venomous snakes, produces a secretion which, though not well studied, is considered not to be medically significant to humans.

Green-colored members of this genus are often referred to as green vine snakes. They are not to be confused with the "green vine snake" Oxybelis fulgidus, which convergently appears very similar but is found in Central and South America.

== Etymology ==
The genus name Ahaetulla comes from the Sri Lankan Sinhalese words ahaetulla/ahata gulla/as gulla, meaning "eye plucker" or "eye picker", because of the belief that they pluck out the eyes of humans, as first reported by the Portuguese traveler João Ribeiro in 1685.

=== Vernacular names ===
The Sinhala name "Aheatulla" or "eye-plucker" forms the taxonomic genus name. In Tamil, it is known as pachai paambu, in Malayalam it is known as pachila paambu, in Telugu it is known as Pasarika Paamu, in Marathi, it is known as shelati snake, and in Kannada it is known as Hasiru Haavu. There are dozens of other vernacular names for this snake genus within its range.

- Sinhala: ඇහැටුල්ලා (Pronounced: Aheatulla)
- Telugu: పచ్చారిపాము; పసరికపాము
- Bengali: লাউডগা.
- Odia: ଲାଉଡଙ୍କିଆ
- Kannada: ಹಸಿರು ಹಾವು, ಹಸಿರು ಬಳ್ಳಿ ಹಾವು.
- Gujarati: લીલવણ, માળણ.
- Marathi हरणटोळ, शेलाटी
- Tamil: பச்சை பாம்பு
- Malayalam: പച്ചില പാമ്പ്,കൺകൊത്തി

== Taxonomy ==
Their closest relative is the monotypic genus Proahaetulla, which Ahaetulla diverged from an estimated 26.57 million years ago, during the mid-Oligocene. From here, the clade containing Proahaetulla and Ahaetulla is a sister group to the genus Dryophiops, and the clade containing all three of these genera is a sister group to the clade containing the bronzeback snakes (Dendrelaphis) and flying snakes (Chrysopelea). These relationships can be shown in the cladogram below, with possible paraphyletic Ahaetulla species noted:

- Ahaetuliinae
  - sharp‑nosed snakes
    - - Ahaetulla
        - - - - - Ahaetulla prasina (paraphyletic)
                - Ahaetulla fasciolata
              - Ahaetulla prasina (paraphyletic)
            - - Ahaetulla prasina (paraphyletic)
              - Ahaetulla mycterizans
          - Ahaetulla prasina (paraphyletic)
        - - - - - Ahaetulla anomala
                - Ahaetulla pulverulenta
              - Ahaetulla nasuta (paraphyletic)
            - Ahaetulla nasuta (paraphyletic)
          - Ahaetulla fronticincta
      - Proahaetulla antiqua
    - Dryophiops
  - broad‑nosed snakes
    - Dendrelaphis
    - Chrysopelea

In 2020, an analysis of Ahaetulla nasuta, Ahaetulla dispar, and Ahaetulla pulverulenta throughout their range found them to represent species complexes containing several undescribed or formerly synonymized species, leading to the description of A. borealis, A. farnsworthi, A. malabarica, A. travancorica, and A. sahyadrensis, as well as the resurrection of A. oxyrhyncha and A. isabellina. Ahaetulla nasuta and Ahaetulla pulverulenta, formerly considered to have much wider ranges, are now considered endemic to Sri Lanka.

=== Species ===
The taxonomy of vine snakes is not well-documented, and literature varies widely, but there are 20 currently accepted species in the genus Ahaetulla:

- Ahaetulla anomala (Annandale, 1906) - Variable colored vine snake (possibly conspecific with A. oxyrhyncha)
- Ahaetulla borealis Mallik, Srikanthan, Pal, Princia D'Souza, Shanker & Ganesh, 2020 - Northern Western Ghats vine snake
- Ahaetulla dispar (Günther, 1864) - Günther's vine snake
- Ahaetulla farnsworthi Mallik, Srikanthan, Pal, Princia D'Souza, Shanker & Ganesh, 2020 - Farnsworth's vine snake
- Ahaetulla fasciolata (Fischer, 1885) - Speckle-headed whipsnake
- Ahaetulla flavescens (Wall, 1910 - yellow whipsnake
- Ahaetulla fronticincta (Günther, 1858) - Burmese vine snake
- Ahaetulla fusca (Duméril, Bibron, & Duméril,1854) - dark whipsnake
- Ahaetulla isabellina (Wall, 1910) - Wall's vine snake
- Ahaetulla laudankia Deepak, Narayanan, Sarkar, Dutta & Mohapatra, 2019 - Laudankia vine snake
- Ahaetulla longirostris Mirza, Pattekar, Verma, Stuart, Purkayastha, Mohapatra & Patel, 2024 - long-snouted arboreal snake
- Ahaetulla malabarica Mallik, Srikanthan, Pal, Princia D'Souza, Shanker & Ganesh, 2020 - Malabar vine snake
- Ahaetulla mycterizans (Linnaeus, 1758) - Malayan green whipsnake
- Ahaetulla nasuta (Lacépède, 1789) - Sri Lankan green vine snake
- Ahaetulla oxyrhyncha (Bell, 1825) - Indian vine snake
- Ahaetulla perroteti (Duméril & Bibron, 1854) - Nilgiri vine snake
- Ahaetulla prasina (Boie, 1827) - Oriental whipsnake or Asian vine snake
  - Ahaetulla prasina prasina (Boie, 1827)
  - Ahaetulla prasina medioxima Lazell, 2002
  - Ahaetulla prasina preocularis (Taylor, 1922)
  - Ahaetulla prasina suluensis Gaulke, 1994
- Ahaetulla pulverulenta (Duméril & Bibron, 1854) - Brown-speckled whipsnake
- Ahaetulla rufusoculara Lam, Thu, Nguyen, Murphy, & Nguyen, 2021
- Ahaetulla sahyadrensis Mallik, Srikanthan, Pal, Princia D'Souza, Shanker & Ganesh, 2020
- Ahaetulla travancorica Mallik, Srikanthan, Pal, Princia D'Souza, Shanker & Ganesh, 2020 - Travancore vine snake

Several undescribed species (including the Southeast Asian Ahaetulla formerly assigned to A. nasuta) still likely remain in these complexes.

== Geographic range ==
They are found from Sri Lanka and India to China and much of Southeast Asia. Sri Lanka and the Western Ghats of India are major hotspots of diversity for the genus, with at least 10 of the currently-described species being endemic to these regions.

== Description ==
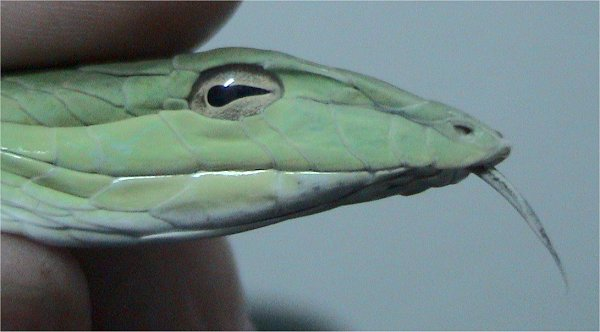
Ahaetulla prasina, showing keyhole shaped pupil

All Ahaetulla species are characterized by thin, elongated bodies, with extremely long tails and a sharply triangular shaped head. They are primarily green in color, but can vary quite a bit to yellows, oranges, greys, and browns. They can have black and/or white patterning, or can be solid in color. Their eyes are almost unique in the reptile world, having keen binocular vision and keyhole shaped pupils, being similar in this aspect with twig snakes, who also have keyhole shaped pupils.

== Behavior ==
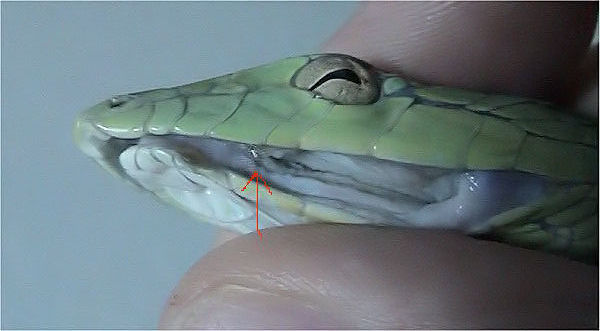
Ahaetulla prasina, showing rear-set fang

They are primarily diurnal and arboreal, living in humid rainforests. Their diet consists mainly of lizards, but sometimes frogs and rodents are also consumed. Ahaetulla fronticincta, however, feeds exclusively on fish, striking its prey from branches overhanging water. Ahaetulla venom is not considered to be dangerous to humans, but serves to cause paralysis in their fast moving prey choices. They are ovoviviparous.

== In captivity ==
Ahaetulla species are not yet frequently captive bred, as are many of the more popular snakes in the reptile keeping hobby. They are suitable for more advanced keepers, requiring a humid arboreal habitat and a diet of lizards as they rarely switch to rodents. Without proper husbandry, they are prone to health issues and stress.
