= Ahaetulla perroteti =

Conservation status
- Endangered (IUCN 3.1)

Scientific classification
- Kingdom: Animalia
- Phylum: Chordata
- Class: Reptilia
- Order: Squamata
- Suborder: Serpentes
- Family: Colubridae
- Subfamily: Ahaetuliinae
- Genus: Ahaetulla
- Species: A. perroteti

Binomial name
- Ahaetulla perroteti (A.M.C. Duméril, Bibron & A.H.A. Duméril, 1854)

Synonyms
- Psammophis perroteti A.M.C. Duméril, Bibron & A.H.A Duméril, 1854; Dryophis tropidococcyx Günther, 1858; Psammophis perroteti — Günther, 1860; Tropidococcyx perroteti — Theobald, 1868; Dryophis perroteti — Boulenger, 1890; Ahaetulla perroteti — Das, 1996

Species of snake

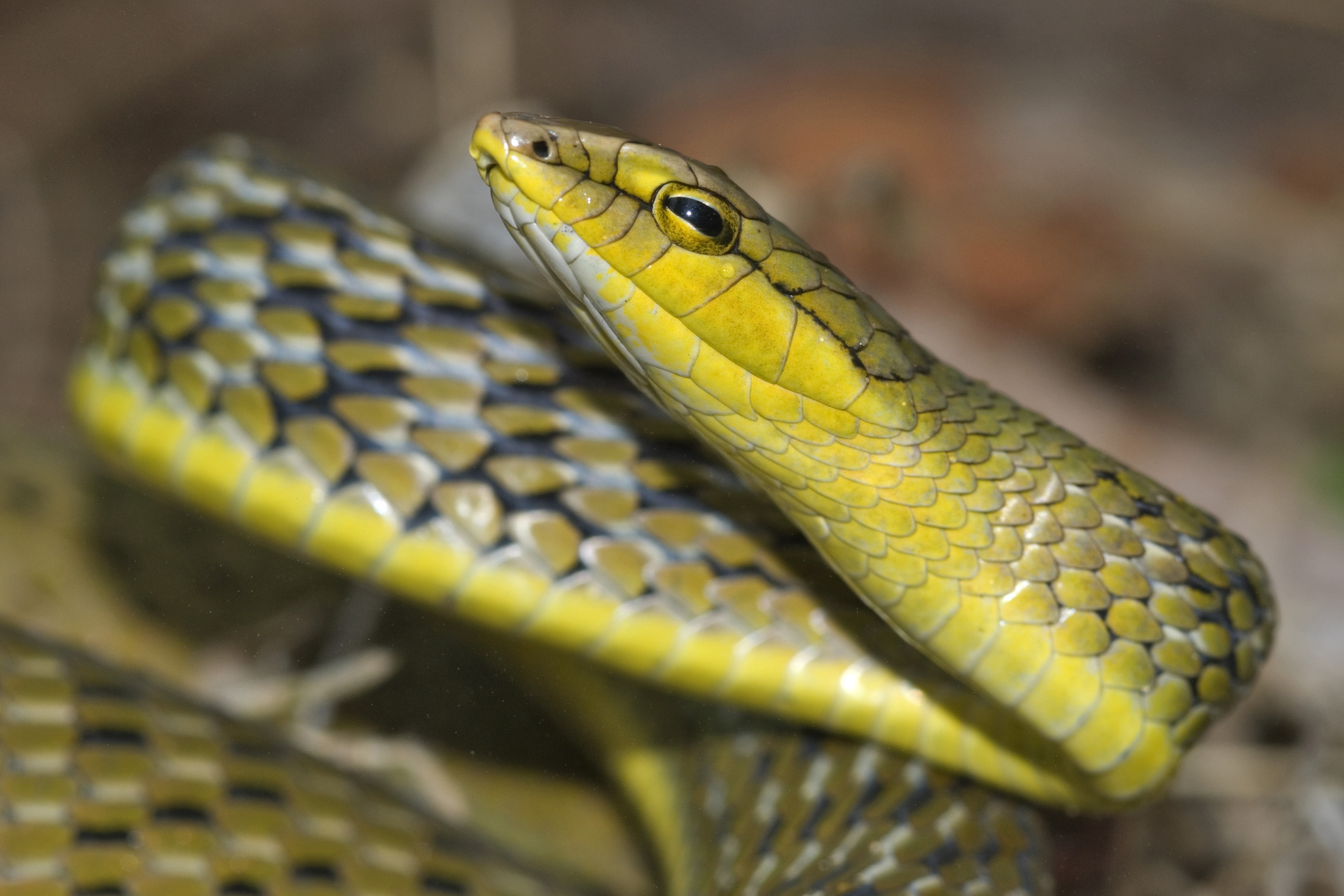
Close-up of the head

Ahaetulla perroteti, known commonly as the bronze-headed vine snake, Perrotet's vine snake, and the Western Ghats bronzeback, is a species of mildly venomous, rear-fanged snake in the subfamily Chrysopeleinae of the family Colubridae. The species is endemic to the Western Ghats in South India.

== Etymology ==
The specific name, perroteti, is in honor of French naturalist George Samuel Perrottet (1793–1867).

== Description ==
See snake scales for terminology.

Ahaetulla perroteti has the following characters. The snout is obtusely pointed and projecting, without dermal appendage, not quite twice as long as the eye. There is no loreal; the internasals and prefrontals are in contact with the labials. The frontal is longer than its distance from the end of the snout, as long as the parietals. There is one preocular, in contact with the frontal, and one postocular. The temporals are arranged 1+2 or 2+2. There are 8 (rarely 9) upper labials, the fourth and fifth entering the eye. 4 lower labials are in contact with the anterior chin shields, which are as long as the posterior chin shields.

The dorsal scales are in 15 rows at midbody, and those on the sacral region are keeled. The ventrals number 138–140. The anal is divided, and the subcaudals number 70–82.

Males are bright green above, yellowish or pale green beneath, with a green lateral line. Females are drab brownish grey with a yellowish venter.

The total length (tail included) is 2 ft (61 cm). The tail is 5.5 in (14 cm).

== Geographic distribution ==
Ahaetulla perroteti is endemic to the Nilgiri Hills of the Western Ghats, in south India. It occurs in high-elevation hills, above 1,600 m (5,200 ft), of Kerala and Tamil Nadu states. This species is known from the Upper Nilgiris, including Mukurthi National Park, Silent Valley, Siruvani peak, and Vellarimala or Camel's Hump. Perhaps it has the smallest geographic range of all Indian Ahaetulla species.

== Biology ==
Ahaetulla perroteti is a diurnal, terrestrial snake found actively moving about on open montane grassland above the tree line. It feeds mainly on lizards and frogs. It is seen basking in full sunlight. It rarely if ever ascends trees.

== Reproduction ==
Ahaetulla perroteti is viviparous.
