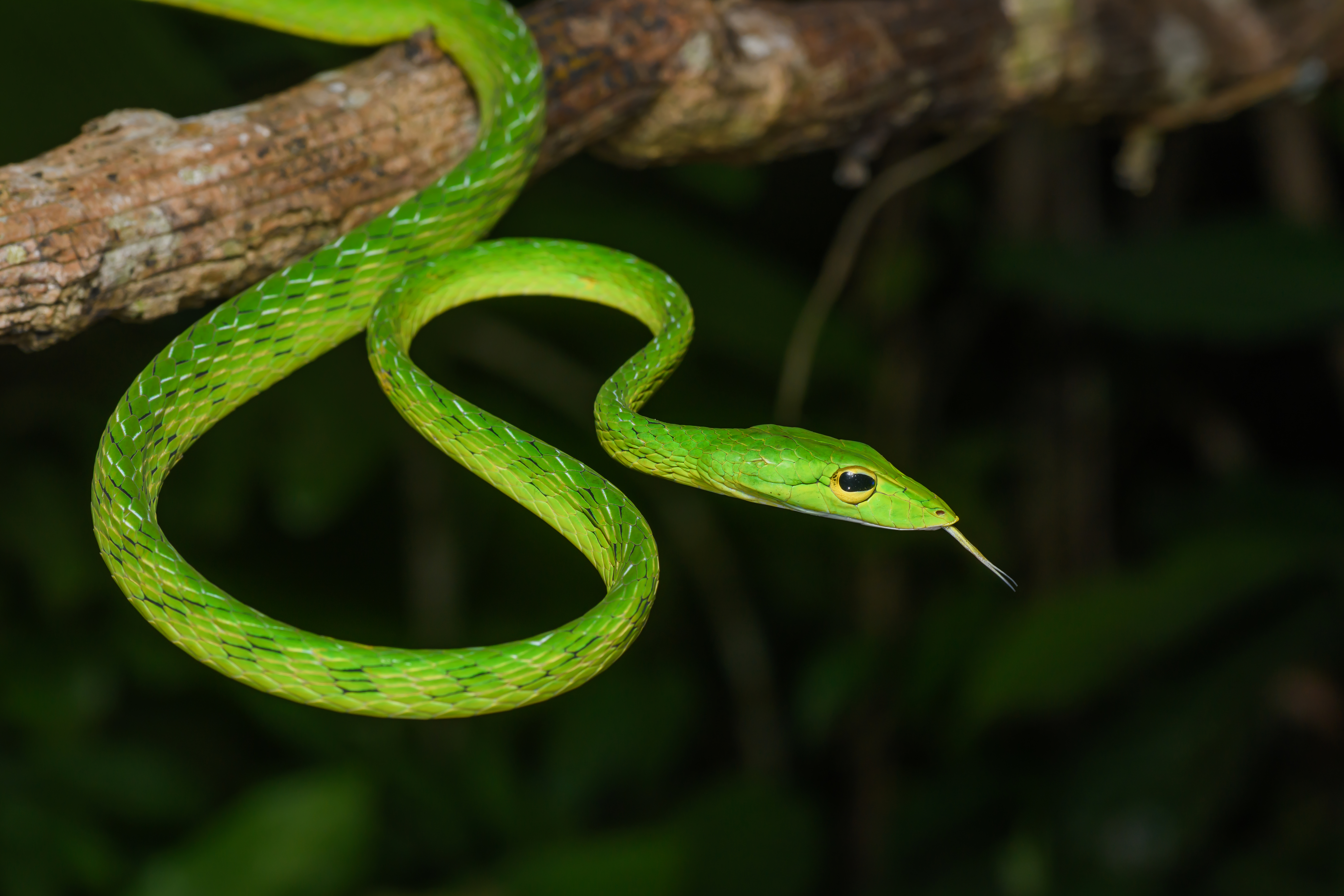

Conservation status
- Least Concern (IUCN 3.1)

Scientific classification
- Kingdom: Animalia
- Phylum: Chordata
- Class: Reptilia
- Order: Squamata
- Suborder: Serpentes
- Family: Colubridae
- Subfamily: Ahaetuliinae
- Genus: Ahaetulla
- Species: A. mycterizans

Binomial name
- Ahaetulla mycterizans (Linnaeus, 1758)

Synonyms
- Coluber mycterizans Linnaeus, 1758; Ahaetulla mycterizans (Linnaeus, 1758); Dryophis mycterizans (Linnaeus, 1758); Passerita mycterizans (Linnaeus, 1758); Coluber nasutus Lacépède, 1789; Dryophis xanthozonia F. Boie, 1827; Passerita xanthozonia (F. Boie, 1827); Tragops xanthozonius (F. Boie, 1827)

= Ahaetulla mycterizans =

Species of snake

Ahaetulla mycterizans, also known commonly as the big-eye green whip snake, the Malayan green whipsnake and the Malayan vine snake, is a species of slender arboreal vine snake in the subfamily Ahaetuliinae of the family Colubridae. The species is native to Southeast Asia.

== Etymology ==
The species name mycterizans comes from the Greek mucterizo, meaning "I turn up the nose," in reference to the shape of the snout of the snake.

== Taxonomy ==
Ahaetulla mycterizans belongs to the genus Ahaetulla, one of five genera within the subfamily Ahaetuliinae. The relationships of Ahaetulla mycterizans to some other Ahaetulla species, and to the other genera within Ahaetuliinae, can be shown in the cladogram below, with possible paraphyletic species noted:

- Ahaetuliinae
  - sharp‑nosed snakes
    - - Ahaetulla
        - - - - - Ahaetulla prasina (paraphyletic)
                - Ahaetulla fasciolata
              - Ahaetulla prasina (paraphyletic)
            - - Ahaetulla prasina (paraphyletic)
              - Ahaetulla mycterizans
          - Ahaetulla prasina (paraphyletic)
        - - - - - Ahaetulla anomala
                - Ahaetulla pulverulenta
              - Ahaetulla nasuta (paraphyletic)
            - Ahaetulla nasuta (paraphyletic)
          - Ahaetulla fronticincta
      - Proahaetulla antiqua
    - Dryophiops
  - broad‑nosed snakes
    - Dendrelaphis
    - Chrysopelea

== Distribution ==
Ahaetulla mycterizans is found in Western Peninsular Malaysia, Java and Sumatra of Indonesia, Singapore, Borneo, Thailand and possibly Laos, at elevation up to 350 m (1,150 ft).

== Description and ecology ==
The Malayan green whipsnake is diurnal and mildly venomous. It occurs in primary and mature secondary forests near streams. Its diet, like that of other whip snakes, consists primarily of frogs and lizards. This slow moving snake often appears like a vine amongst foliage and is hard to detect. When threatened, it can expand the anterior part of its body exposing the dark scales. It is often confused with the oriental whipsnake (Ahaetulla prasina) but the former does not occur in disturbed areas or parks or gardens, especially in its distributional range of Singapore. The Malayan whipsnake can be distinguished from the oriental whipsnake by the former having larger eyes and the flanks lacking a thin yellow line. The former is also smaller, up to 1 m (3.3 ft) snout-to-vent length (SVL) as compared to the oriental whipsnake which can grow up to 2 m (6.6 ft) SVL.

Very little is known about the ecology and natural history of this species.
