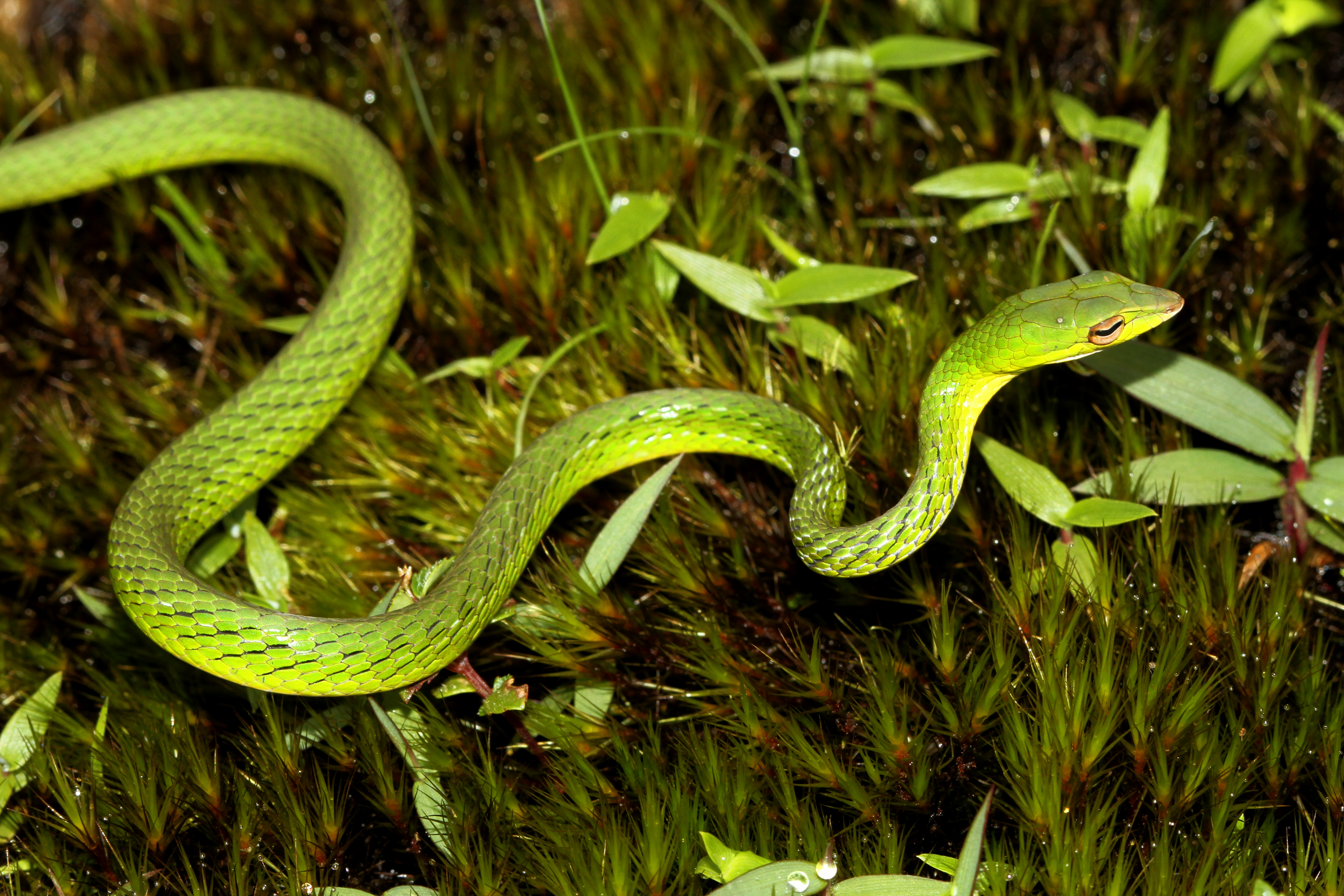

Conservation status
- Near Threatened (IUCN 3.1)

Scientific classification
- Kingdom: Animalia
- Phylum: Chordata
- Class: Reptilia
- Order: Squamata
- Suborder: Serpentes
- Family: Colubridae
- Subfamily: Ahaetuliinae
- Genus: Ahaetulla
- Species: A. dispar

Binomial name
- Ahaetulla dispar (Günther, 1864)

Synonyms
- Dryophis dispar; Tragops dispar

= Ahaetulla dispar =

Gunther's vine snake

Species of reptile

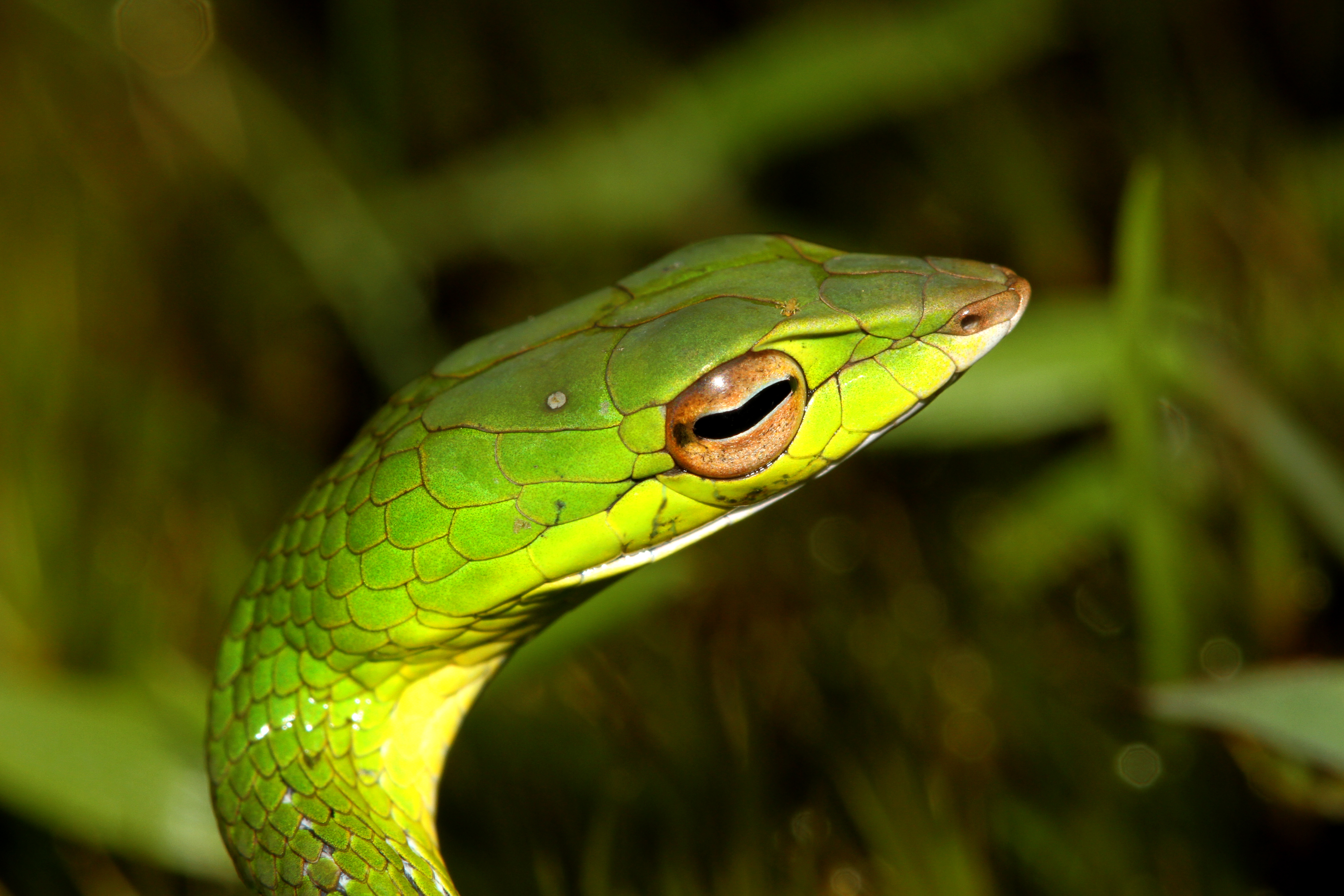
Head

Ahaetulla dispar, the Gunther's vine snake, is a species of tree snake endemic to the Western Ghats. It is primarily restricted to the Shola forests of the Southern Western Ghats where it is found often on high-elevation montane grasslands and the low shrub belts.

== Description ==
Snout pointed and projecting, without dermal appendage, not quite twice as long as the eye. Internasals and prefrontals usually in contact with the labials; one or two small loreals; frontal as long as its distance from the end of the snout or longer, as long as the parietals; one preocular, in contact with the frontal, with one or two suboculara below; twopostoculars; temporals 2+2 or 2+3; upper labials 8, fifth entering the eye; 4 lower labials in contact with the anterior chin-shields, which are as long as the posterior or a little shorter. Scales in 15 rows, those of the sacral region more or less distinctly keeled. Ventrals 142–151; anal divided; sub-caudals 90-105. Dorsal body Bright green or bronzy olive with two yellowish stripes along the ventrals, the skin between the scales black; ventral surface pale green to pale olive. Total length 26 inches; tail 7.5.

== Geographic Range ==
It is endemic to Southern Western Ghats in Kerala and Tamil Nadu states of South India, from the Anaimalai Hills to the region north of the Shencottah Gap. Precise records are from Munnar, Anaimalai, Grass Hills National Park, Palni hills, Meghamalai, Periyar Tiger Reserve, and Travancore hills. Populations south of the Shencottah Gap, in regions such as the Agasthyamalai Hills, are now considered to belong to a separate species, A. travancorica. It is a high-elevation species, occurring only above 1300 m, all the way up to 2695 m asl.

== Habits and habitat ==
It is a diurnal, semi arboreal and sometimes terrestrial snake, often found in low bushes or rocks and high elevation forests and grasslands of the Western Ghats. Males are often green, while females are brown. It mainly feeds on lizards and frogs. It is considered to have a mild venom and is rear-fanged. It is presumed to be ovoviviparous, giving birth to live young ones. Natural history poorly known.
