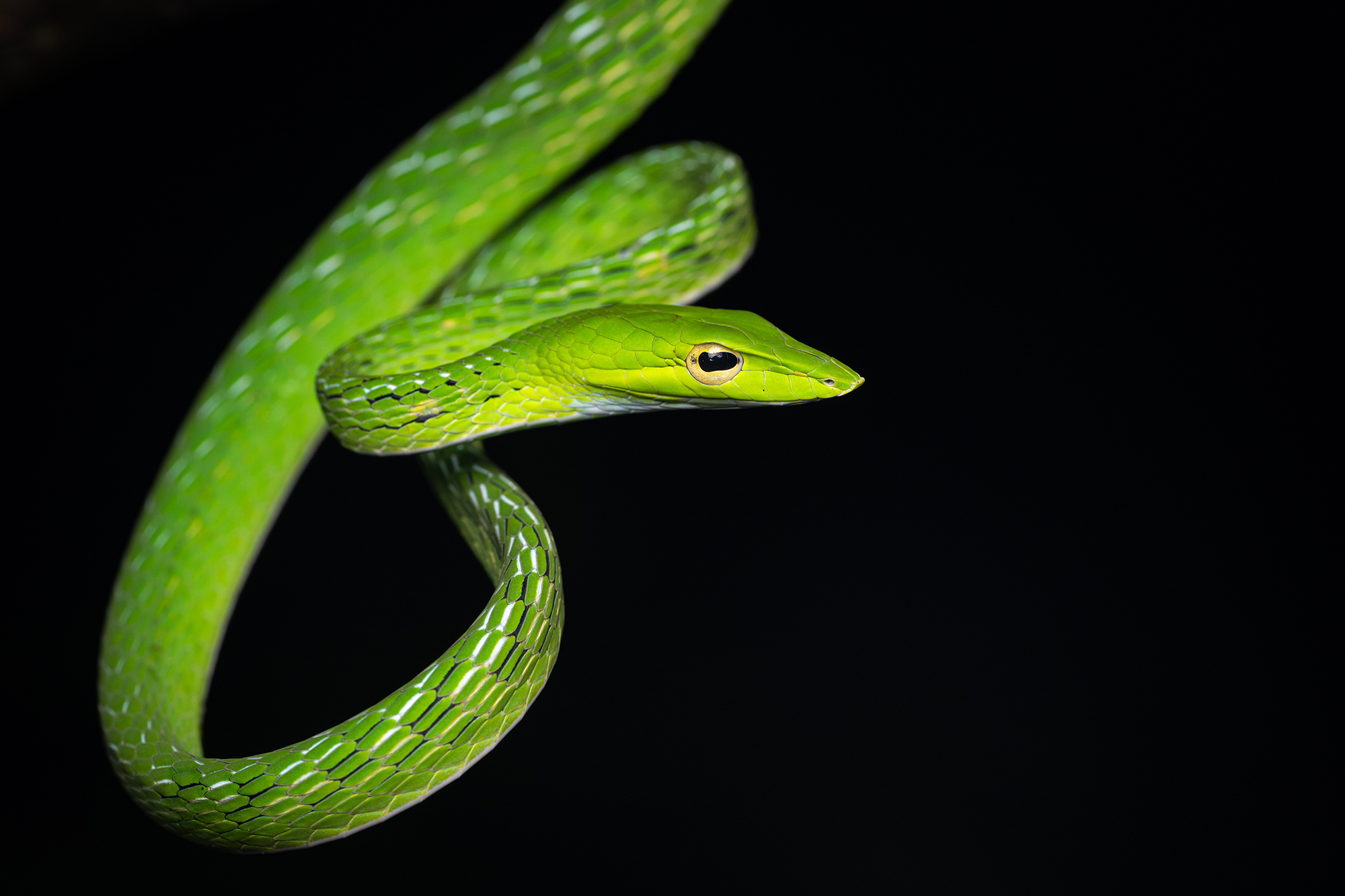
- Ahaetulla flavescens from Mizoram, India

Scientific classification
- Kingdom: Animalia
- Phylum: Chordata
- Class: Reptilia
- Order: Squamata
- Suborder: Serpentes
- Family: Colubridae
- Subfamily: Ahaetuliinae
- Genus: Ahaetulla
- Species: A. flavescens

Binomial name
- Ahaetulla flavescens (Wall, 1910)

= Ahaetulla flavescens =

Species of snake

Ahaetulla flavescens, the yellow whipsnake, is a species of snake in the family Colubridae. The species is found in India, Bhutan, and Myanmar.
