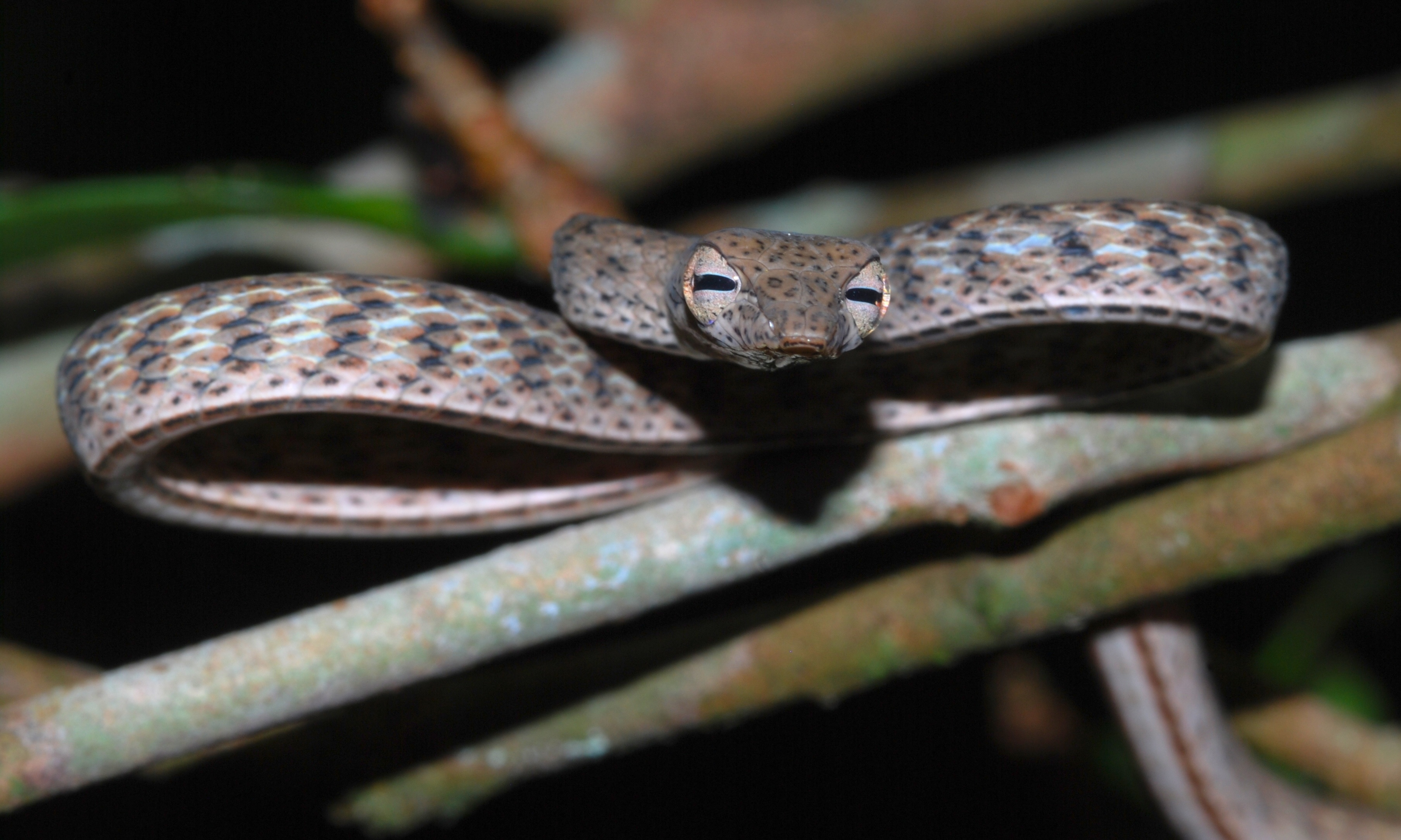

Conservation status
- Least Concern (IUCN 3.1)

Scientific classification
- Kingdom: Animalia
- Phylum: Chordata
- Class: Reptilia
- Order: Squamata
- Suborder: Serpentes
- Family: Colubridae
- Subfamily: Ahaetuliinae
- Genus: Ahaetulla
- Species: A. fasciolata

Binomial name
- Ahaetulla fasciolata (Fischer, 1885)

= Ahaetulla fasciolata =

Speckle-headed whipsnake

Species of snake

The speckle-headed whipsnake (Ahaetulla fasciolata) is a species of colubrid vine snake found in Southeast Asia.

== Description ==
It has a thin, elongated body, an extremely long tail and a sharply triangular-shaped head. Adults can measure up to 0.8 m. The upper body is usually brownish-grey, but can vary greatly to yellows, oranges, greens and browns, and may have ill-defined transverse bars on the neck and anterior part of the body, or may be solid in color. The belly is whitish with a black line near the ends of the ventral scales. The head is usually punctuated with dark spots. A thin dark line across the eye separates the darker head from the lighter cheeks. The upper lips and underside of the head are whitish with dark spots.

The scales pattern observed in specimens from Thailand were: ventral 227–238, subcaudal (187–192) + 1 paired, dorsal scales in 15 rows, 9 supralabial, with the 4th to 5th touching the eye, 1 preocular, 2 postocular. The anal scales are entire in this species.

== Taxonomy ==
It belongs to the genus Ahaetulla, one of five genera within the subfamily Ahaetuliinae. The relationships of Ahaetulla fasciolata to some other Ahaetulla species, and to the other genera within Ahaetuliinae, can be shown in the cladogram below, with possible paraphyletic species noted:

- Ahaetuliinae
  - sharp‑nosed snakes
    - - Ahaetulla
        - - - - - Ahaetulla prasina (paraphyletic)
                - Ahaetulla fasciolata
              - Ahaetulla prasina (paraphyletic)
            - - Ahaetulla prasina (paraphyletic)
              - Ahaetulla mycterizans
          - Ahaetulla prasina (paraphyletic)
        - - - - - Ahaetulla anomala
                - Ahaetulla pulverulenta
              - Ahaetulla nasuta (paraphyletic)
            - Ahaetulla nasuta (paraphyletic)
          - Ahaetulla fronticincta
      - Proahaetulla antiqua
    - Dryophiops
  - broad‑nosed snakes
    - Dendrelaphis
    - Chrysopelea

== Distribution ==
The snake is found in the Southeast Asian countries of Indonesia, Brunei, Malaysia, Singapore, and Thailand.
