= Ahaetulla rufusoculara =

Scientific classification
- Kingdom: Animalia
- Phylum: Chordata
- Class: Reptilia
- Order: Squamata
- Suborder: Serpentes
- Family: Colubridae
- Subfamily: Ahaetuliinae
- Genus: Ahaetulla
- Species: A. rufusoculara

Binomial name
- Ahaetulla rufusoculara Lam, Thu, Nguyen, Murphy, & Nguyen, 2021

Species of snake

Ahaetulla rufusoculara, the red-eyed vine snake, is a species of snake in the family Colubridae. It is endemic to Vietnam where it is known from the Sóc Trăng province.

Ahaetulla rufusoculara can reach 108.5 cm (42.7 in) in total length. The dorsum is bright green. A yellow or white stripe runs along the lower flank. The eyes are red.
