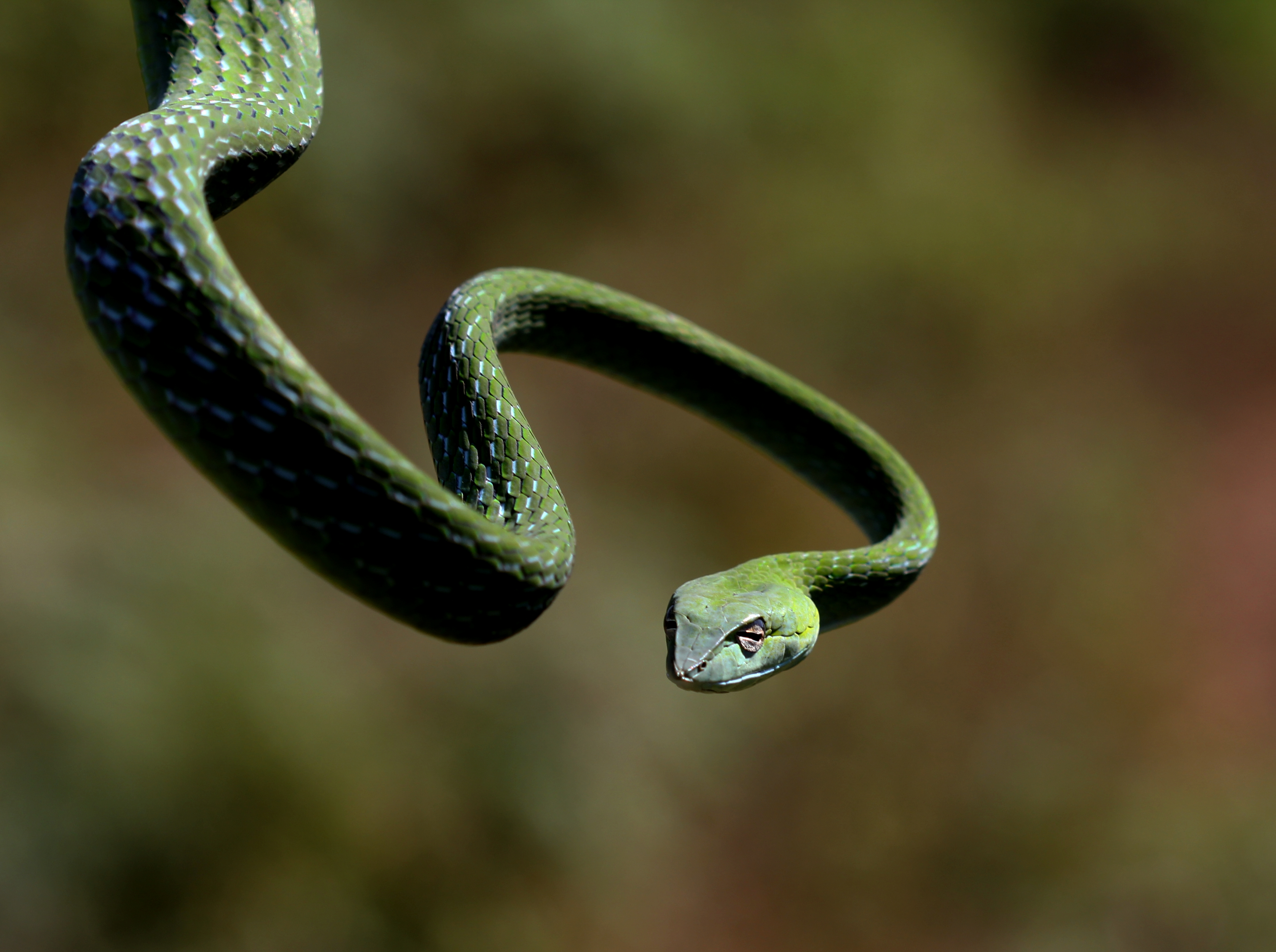
- At Tadiandamol, Karnataka

Scientific classification
- Kingdom: Animalia
- Phylum: Chordata
- Class: Reptilia
- Order: Squamata
- Suborder: Serpentes
- Family: Colubridae
- Subfamily: Ahaetuliinae
- Genus: Ahaetulla
- Species: A. malabarica

Binomial name
- Ahaetulla malabarica Mallik, Srikanthan, Pal, Princia D'Souza, Shanker, and Ganesh, 2020

= Ahaetulla malabarica =

Malabar vine snake

Species of tree snake

The Malabar vine snake (Ahaetulla malabarica), is a species of tree snake endemic to the southern portion of the central Western Ghats of India.

== Taxonomy ==
It was formerly considered conspecific with A. nasuta, which is now considered to only be endemic to Sri Lanka. A 2020 study found A. nasuta to be a species complex of A. nasuta sensu stricto as well as A. borealis, A. farnsworthi, A. isabellina, and A. malabarica.

== Description ==
The body is very slender and adults can reach a total length (snout-nail) of 1 m. Dorsum is uniform bright green, sometimes sunset yellow to light bronzy brown. Rostral scale, infralabials and venter are bright green to lighter green, or turmeric yellow to light brown, in mid body; some infralabials have small white patches. Yellow or white ventral stripe along notched ventral keels from a few scale rows after the nape; slight discolouration in the preocular; inter-scalar white with black and white anteriorly-converging bars, white becoming uniform pinkish posteriorly; golden yellow to orange eyes with black speckles; concentration of black speckles both in the anterior and posterior ends of a horizontal pupil, with a light blue or yellow colouration around the pupil; tail and subcaudals are green.

In general, scalation follows intraspecific variations: ventrals 167–183, notched with keels; subcaudals 124 -155, divided; dorsal scale in 15-15–13/11/9 rows of smooth, obliquely disposed scales; anal divided; supralabials 8–9; 5th supralabial in contact with the eye; supralabial scale division on the 4th; infralabials 8–9; pre-suboculars 1–2; 1 preocular (both left and right); postoculars 2; suboculars absent; temporals 1+2 or 2+2.

== Geographic range ==
This species is distributed in the southern portion of the central Western Ghats, from the Palghat Gap in Tamil Nadu and Kerala north to Tadiandamol in Karnataka. A. farnsworthi is found to the north of the species' range and may be sympatric with it at Coorg (although largely separated by rivers), while A. isabellina is found to the south of the species' range, being separated from it by the Palghat Gap.

== Habitat ==
The species is found in mid-elevation evergreen forests in the Western Ghats from ~650 to 1400 msl.
