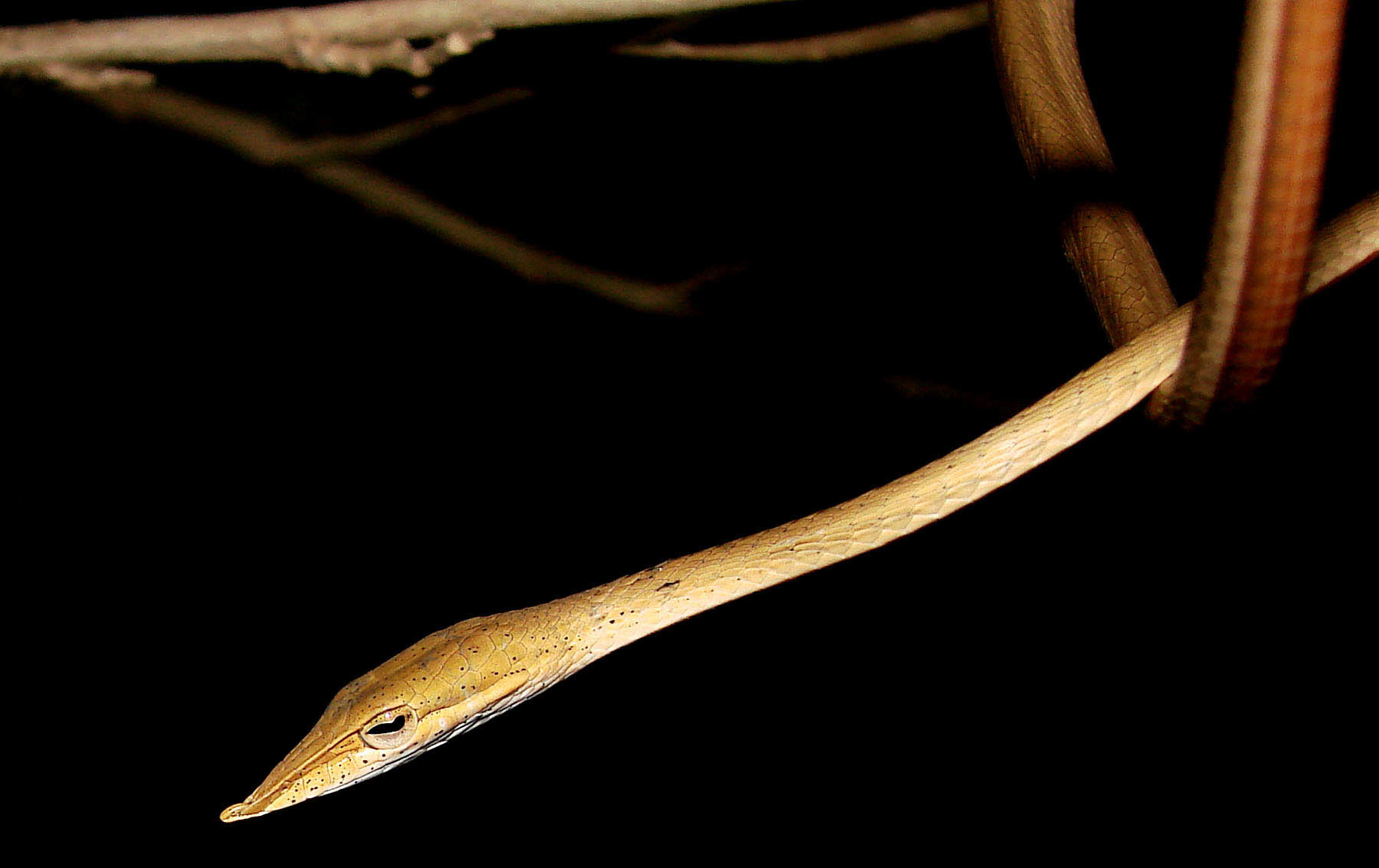

Conservation status
- Least Concern (IUCN 3.1)

Scientific classification
- Kingdom: Animalia
- Phylum: Chordata
- Order: Squamata
- Suborder: Serpentes
- Family: Colubridae
- Subfamily: Ahaetuliinae
- Genus: Ahaetulla
- Species: A. laudankia

Binomial name
- Ahaetulla laudankia Deepak et al. 2019.

= Ahaetulla laudankia =

Species of snake

Ahaetulla laudankia, known as the Laudankia vine snake, is a species of snake in the family Colubridae. It is endemic to India and while being a rare species, it has a relatively large range, extending from the Eastern Ghats through Central India west to eastern Rajasthan. Its name derives from the Odia term laudanka, which translates to "dried stems of bottle gourd, as the snake closely resembles them with its thin body and brownish color.
