= Ahaetulla fusca =

Scientific classification
- Kingdom: Animalia
- Phylum: Chordata
- Class: Reptilia
- Order: Squamata
- Suborder: Serpentes
- Family: Colubridae
- Subfamily: Ahaetuliinae
- Genus: Ahaetulla
- Species: A. fusca

Binomial name
- Ahaetulla fusca (Duméril, Bibron, & Duméril, 1854)

Species of snake

Ahaetulla fusca (Indochinese Long Nosed Vine Snake), is a species of snake in the family Colubridae. The species is found throughout Southeast Asia .

== Description ==
Adults can grow up to 2 meters in length and are characterized by a slender body, a prehensile tail, and an elongated, pointed head. The species displays an emerald green coloration, lighter on the belly, with black and white interstitial skin. It has horizontal pupils and a distinctly elongated snout, sometimes slightly upturned.

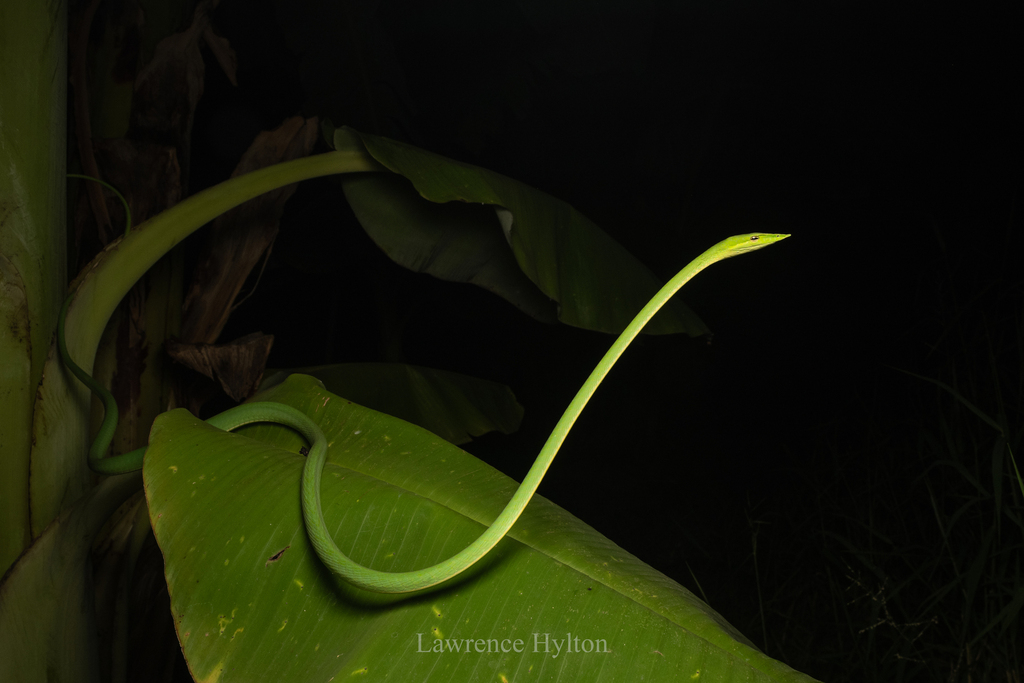
Indochinese Long Nosed Vine snake (A. fusca)

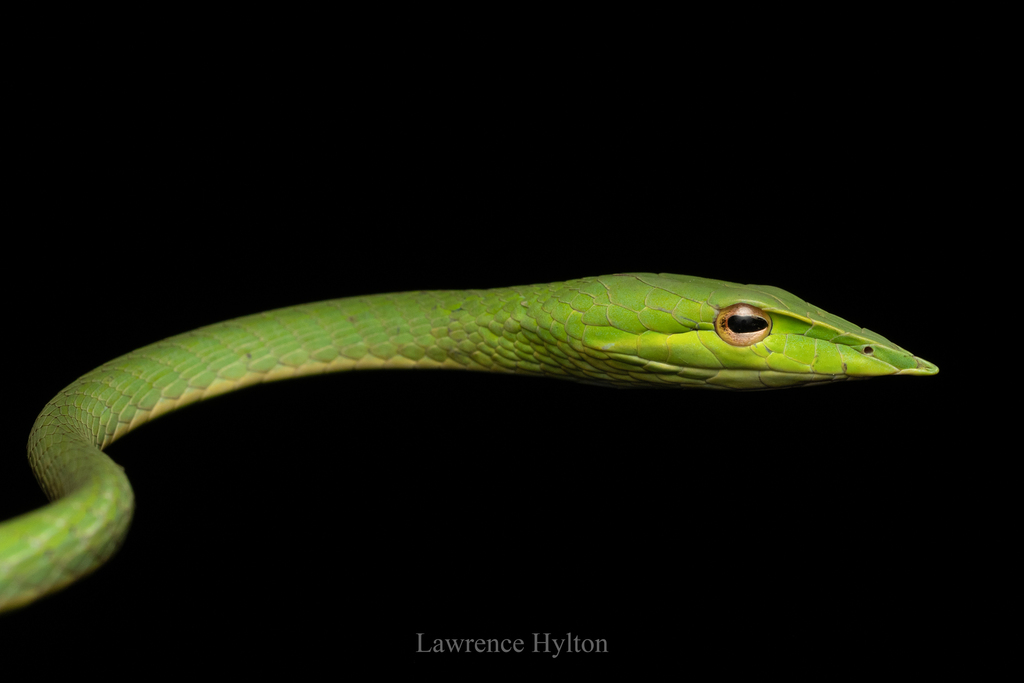
Indochinese Long Nosed Vine snake (A. fusca) Close up head photo

== Range and Habitat ==
This species is found from Myanmar and Thailand to Cambodia and south Vietnam. A. fusca primarily inhabits lowland dry forests but is also commonly found in disturbed habitats, where it adapts well to altered environments.
