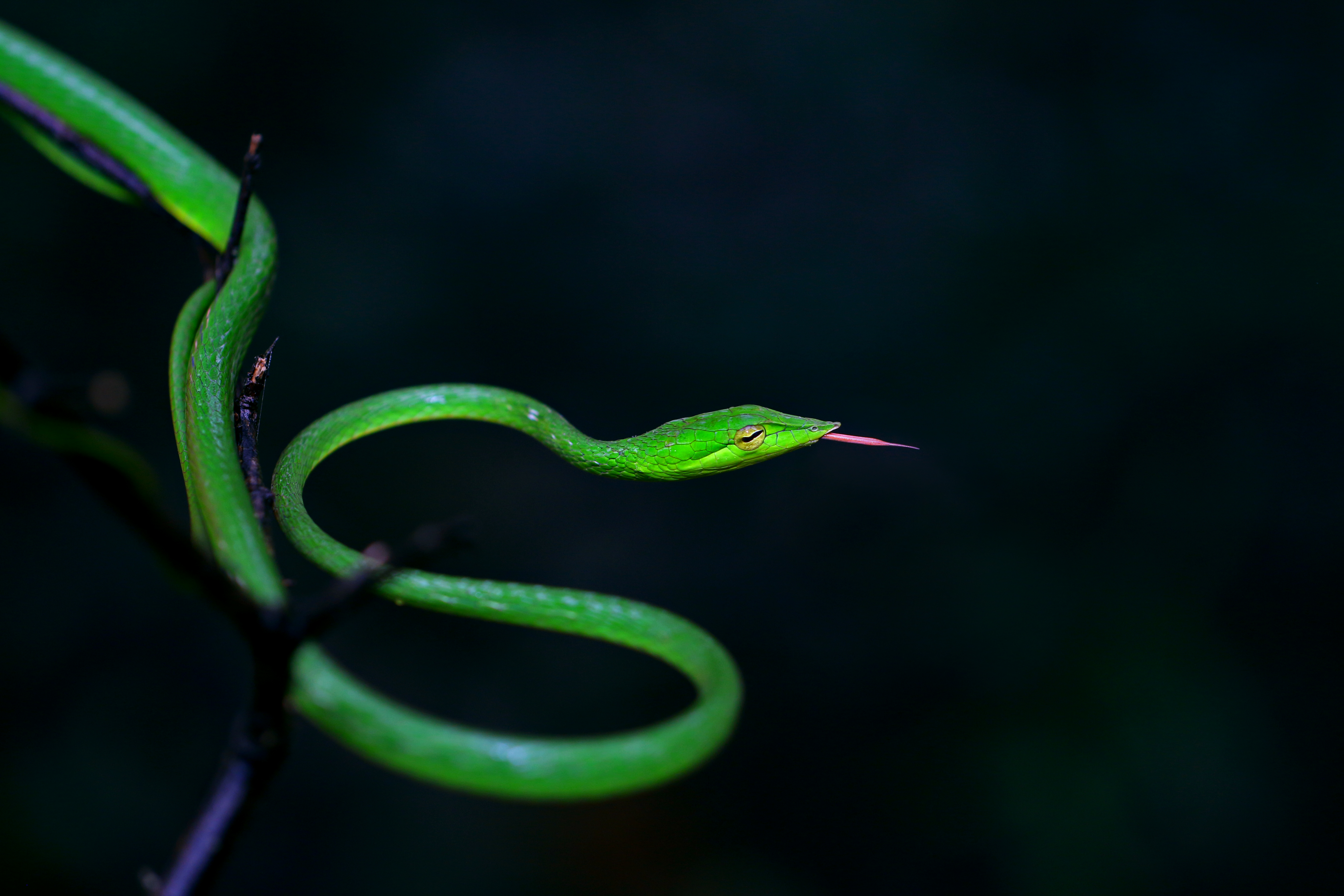
- In Amboli, Maharashtra

Scientific classification
- Kingdom: Animalia
- Phylum: Chordata
- Class: Reptilia
- Order: Squamata
- Suborder: Serpentes
- Family: Colubridae
- Subfamily: Ahaetuliinae
- Genus: Ahaetulla
- Species: A. borealis

Binomial name
- Ahaetulla borealis Mallik, Srikanthan, Pal, Princia D'Souza, Shanker, and Ganesh, 2020

= Ahaetulla borealis =

Northern Western Ghats vine snake

Species of tree snake

The northern Western Ghats vine snake (Ahaetulla borealis) is a species of tree snake endemic to the northern Western Ghats of India.

== Taxonomy ==
It was formerly considered conspecific with A. nasuta, which is now considered to only be endemic to Sri Lanka. A 2020 study found A. nasuta to be a species complex of A. nasuta sensu stricto as well as A. borealis, A. farnsworthi, A. isabellina, and A. malabarica.

The specific epithet borealis derives from Latin, adjective termed after the 'boreal' or northern parts of a region, referring to its distribution in the Northern Western Ghats.

== Description ==
Dorsum uniform olive green to light green, scales bordered with brown. Scales on head sometimes with dark blue dots bordered with light blue. Eye yellow to orange with light brown marbled patterns; horizontal pupil with a light blue or yellow colouration around the pupil. Rostral, infralabials and venter at midbody light green to light blue. Sometimes a yellow ventral stripe along notched ventral keels. Tail and subcaudals green. Adults can reach 1 m of total length with a head very distinct from neck and relatively long and slender tail.

In general, scalation are: ventrals 174–181, notched with keels; subcaudals 142–157, divided; dorsal scale rows in 15-15–13/11 rows of smooth, obliquely disposed scales; anal divided; supralabials 8–9 with 6th supralabial being the largest; 5th supralabial in contact with the eye; 4th supralabial divided; loreal absent, infralabials 8–9; pre-suboculars 1–2 ; pre-ocular 1 (both left and right); postoculars 2–3; sub-oculars absent; temporals 2+2 or 2+3.

== Geographic range ==
This species is one of the most widespread of Western Ghats Ahaetulla, ranging from Sirsi, Karnataka north to Matheran, Maharashtra. Near the southern edge of its range it is flanked by A. farnsworthi, from which it is likely separated by the Sharavathi River basin.

== Habitat ==
It is found in low-to-mid-elevation moist deciduous and semi-evergreen forests at a mean sea level of 300 – 750.
