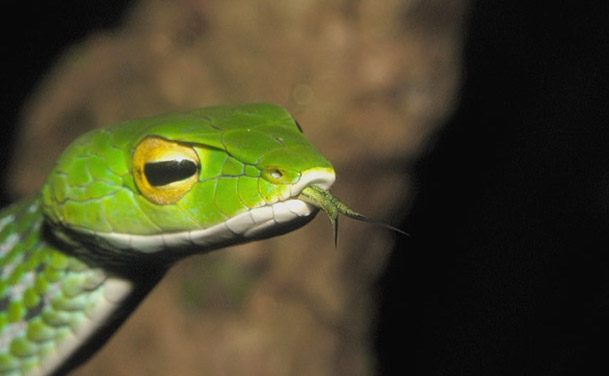
- From Kalakkad Mundanthurai Tiger Reserve, Tamil Nadu

Scientific classification
- Kingdom: Animalia
- Phylum: Chordata
- Class: Reptilia
- Order: Squamata
- Suborder: Serpentes
- Family: Colubridae
- Subfamily: Ahaetuliinae
- Genus: Ahaetulla
- Species: A. travancorica

Binomial name
- Ahaetulla travancorica Mallik, Srikanthan, Pal, Princia D'Souza, Shanker & Ganesh, 2020

= Ahaetulla travancorica =

Travancore vine snake

Species of Reptilia

The Travancore vine snake (Ahaetulla travancorica), is a species of tree snake endemic to the southern Western Ghats of India.

== Taxonomy ==
It was formerly considered conspecific with A. dispar (which is now considered to have a more northerly distribution in the Western Ghats), but a 2020 study found it to represent a new species.

== Geographic range ==
This species is endemic to the Agasthyamalai Hills of the southern Western Ghats in Tamil Nadu and Kerala. The specimen that the species was described from originates from a single locality in Peppara Wildlife Sanctuary. The Shencottah Gap north of the Agasthyamalais separates it from its closest relative, A. dispar.

== Habitat ==
This species is found in high-elevation shola forests in the Western Ghats above 1000 msl.
