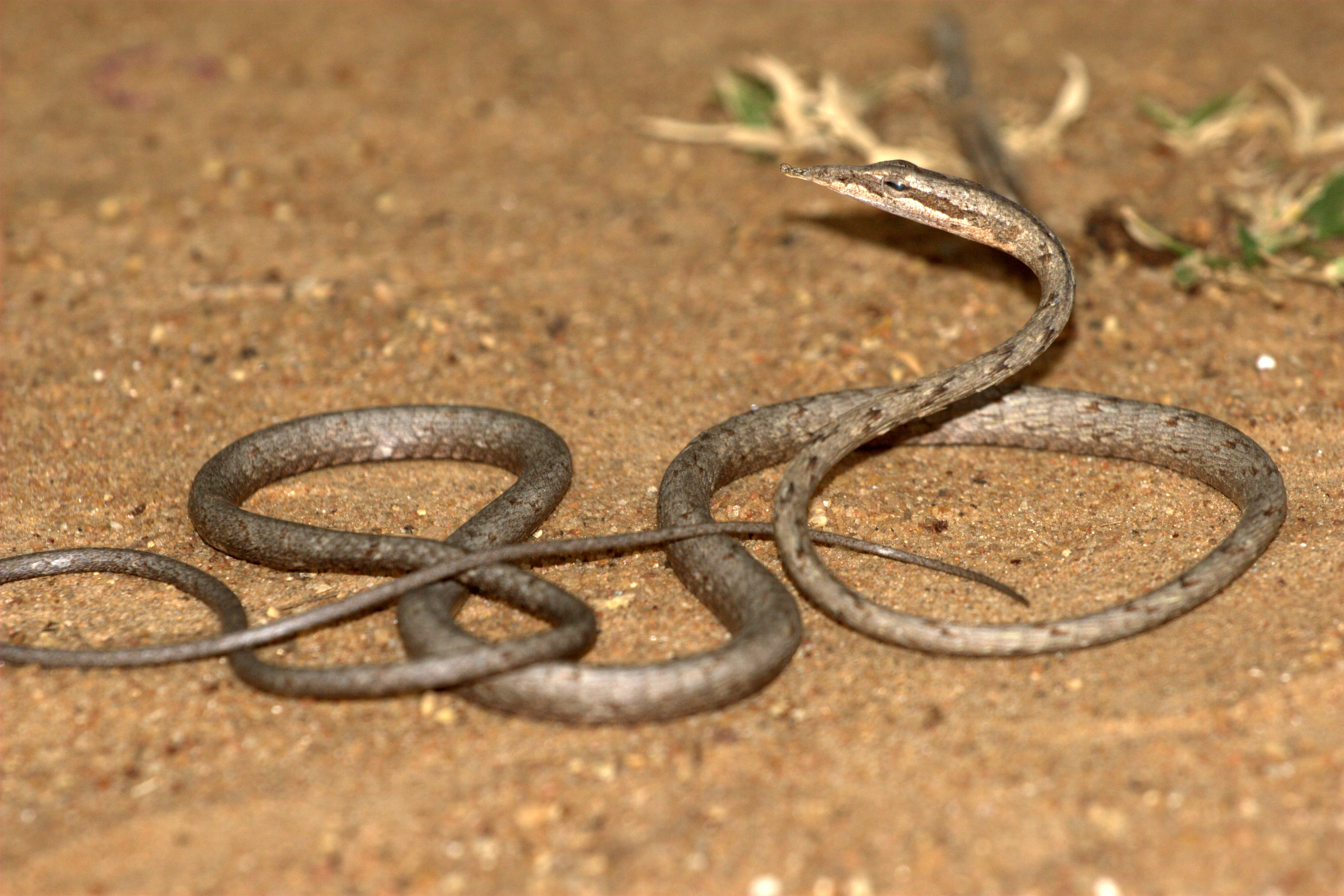

Conservation status
- Least Concern (IUCN 3.1)

Scientific classification
- Kingdom: Animalia
- Phylum: Chordata
- Class: Reptilia
- Order: Squamata
- Suborder: Serpentes
- Family: Colubridae
- Subfamily: Ahaetuliinae
- Genus: Ahaetulla
- Species: A. pulverulenta

Binomial name
- Ahaetulla pulverulenta (Duméril, Bibron & Duméril, 1854)

Synonyms
- Dryophis pulverulentus

= Ahaetulla pulverulenta =

Species of snake

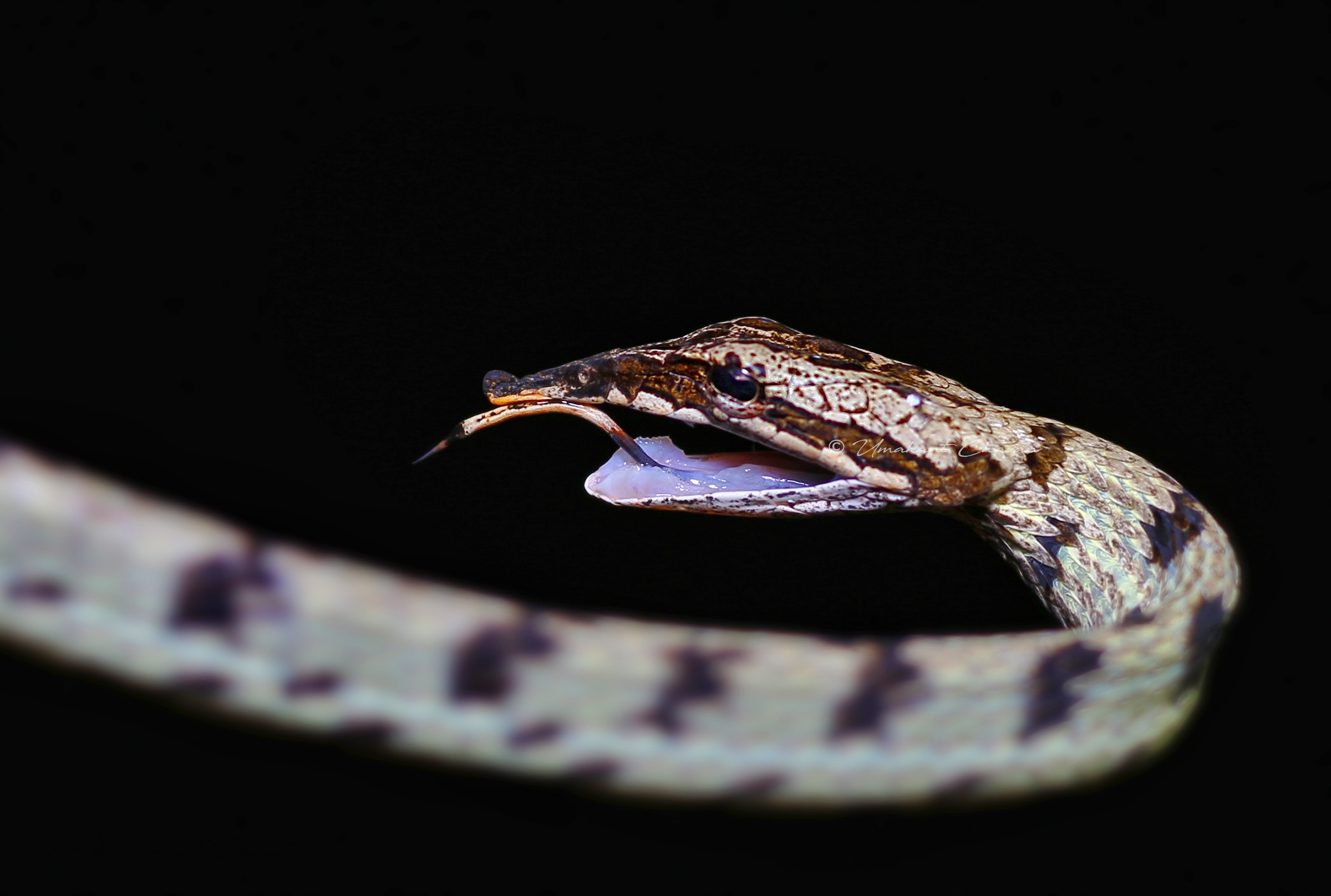
brown vine snake

Brown-speckled whipsnake or brown vine snake (Ahaetulla pulverulenta) is a species of colubrid vine snake endemic to Sri Lanka.

== Etymology ==
It is known as හෙනකදයා (henakadaya) in Sinhala; this name provided the name anaconda.

The species name pulverulenta is from Latin, named after its ashy or dusty grayish brown coloration.

== Taxonomy ==
It belongs to the genus Ahaetulla, one of five genera within the subfamily Ahaetuliinae. The relationships of Ahaetulla pulverulenta to some other Ahaetulla species, and to the other genera within Ahaetuliinae, can be shown in the cladogram below, with possible paraphyletic species noted:

- Ahaetuliinae
  - sharp‑nosed snakes
    - - Ahaetulla
        - - - - - Ahaetulla prasina (paraphyletic)
                - Ahaetulla fasciolata
              - Ahaetulla prasina (paraphyletic)
            - - Ahaetulla prasina (paraphyletic)
              - Ahaetulla mycterizans
          - Ahaetulla prasina (paraphyletic)
        - - - - - Ahaetulla anomala
                - Ahaetulla pulverulenta
              - Ahaetulla nasuta (paraphyletic)
            - Ahaetulla nasuta (paraphyletic)
          - Ahaetulla fronticincta
      - Proahaetulla antiqua
    - Dryophiops
  - broad‑nosed snakes
    - Dendrelaphis
    - Chrysopelea

== Distribution and habitat ==
It is found exclusively in Sri Lanka. Populations in the Western Ghats of India are now considered a separate species, Ahaetulla sahyadrensis.

It lives in forests and is fully arboreal.

== Description ==
Its slender body can be up to 1.7 m (5 ft 7 in) long from snout to tail, and is grayish-brown colored, with darker blackish spots above and a gray or brown underside. It has a pointed snout, ending in a dermal appendage at the tip. It has a dark brown rhomboidal spot on the top of the head, and a brown stripe on each side of the head passing through the eye.

Large, transversely oval eye with horizontal pupil; gray or brown, with darker brown spots and dark brown cross or cross-shaped markings.

== Behavior ==
It feeds on lizards and other invertebrates, and it is ovoviviparous, giving birth to 5-15 live offspring.

== Gallery ==
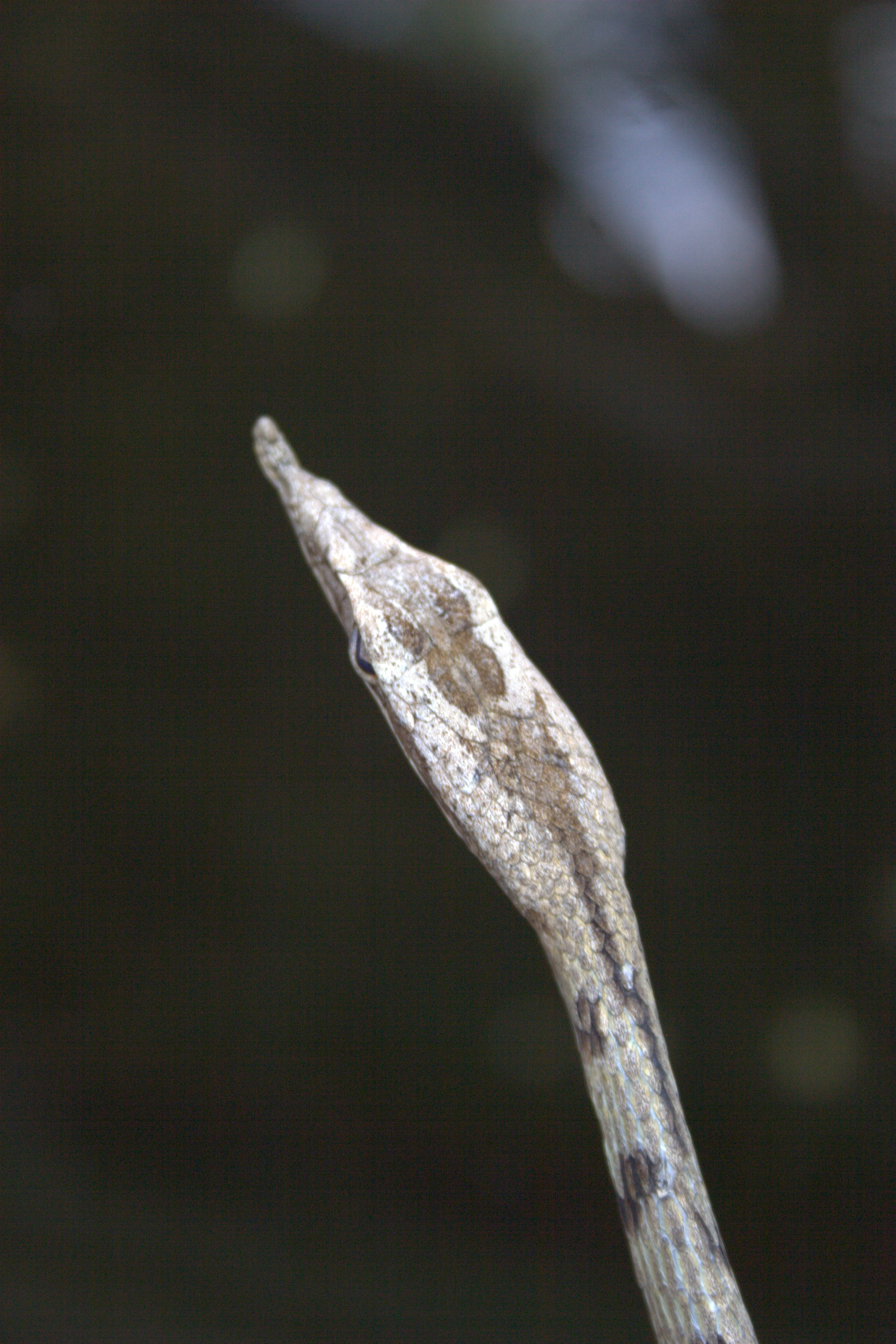
Head profile from top

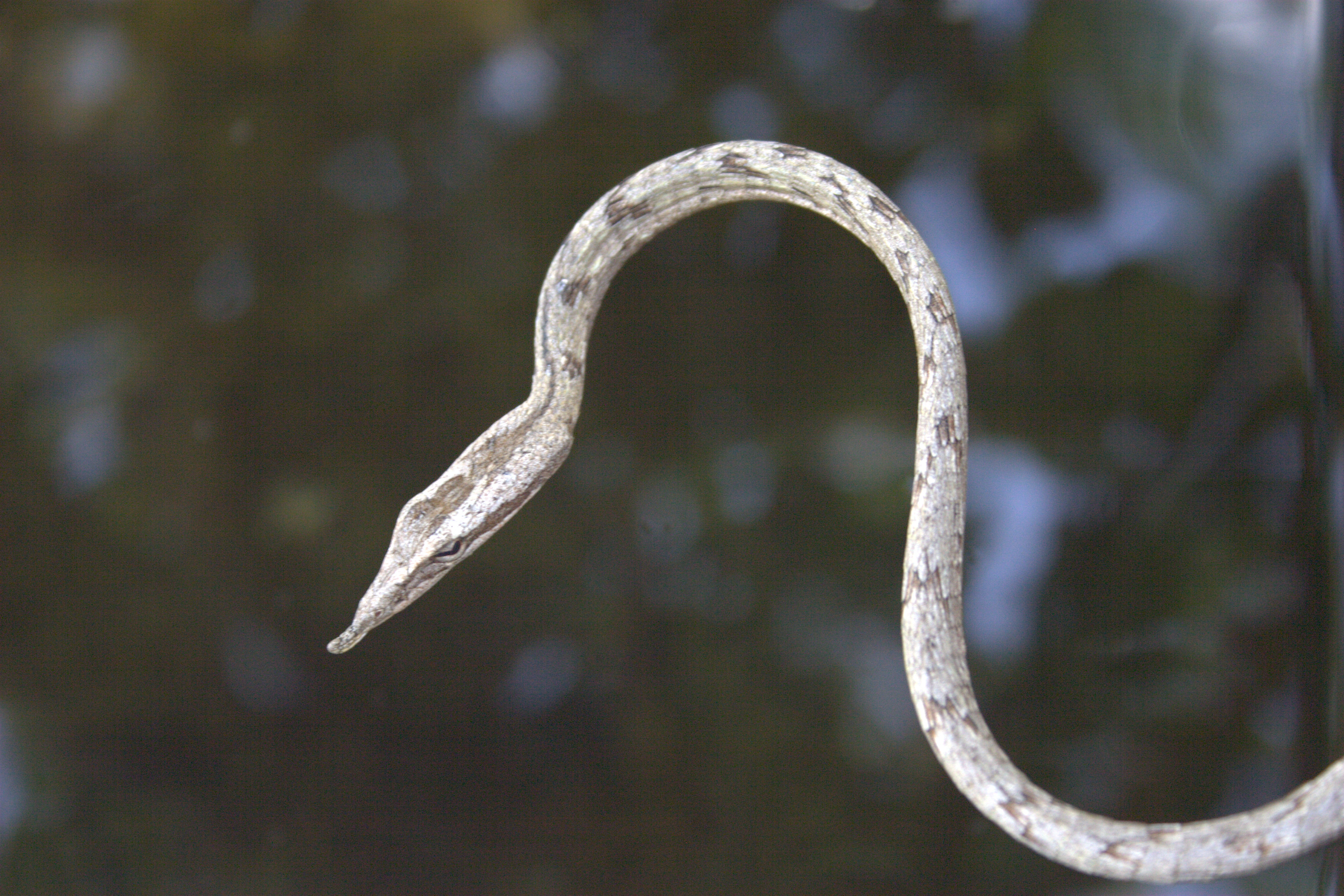

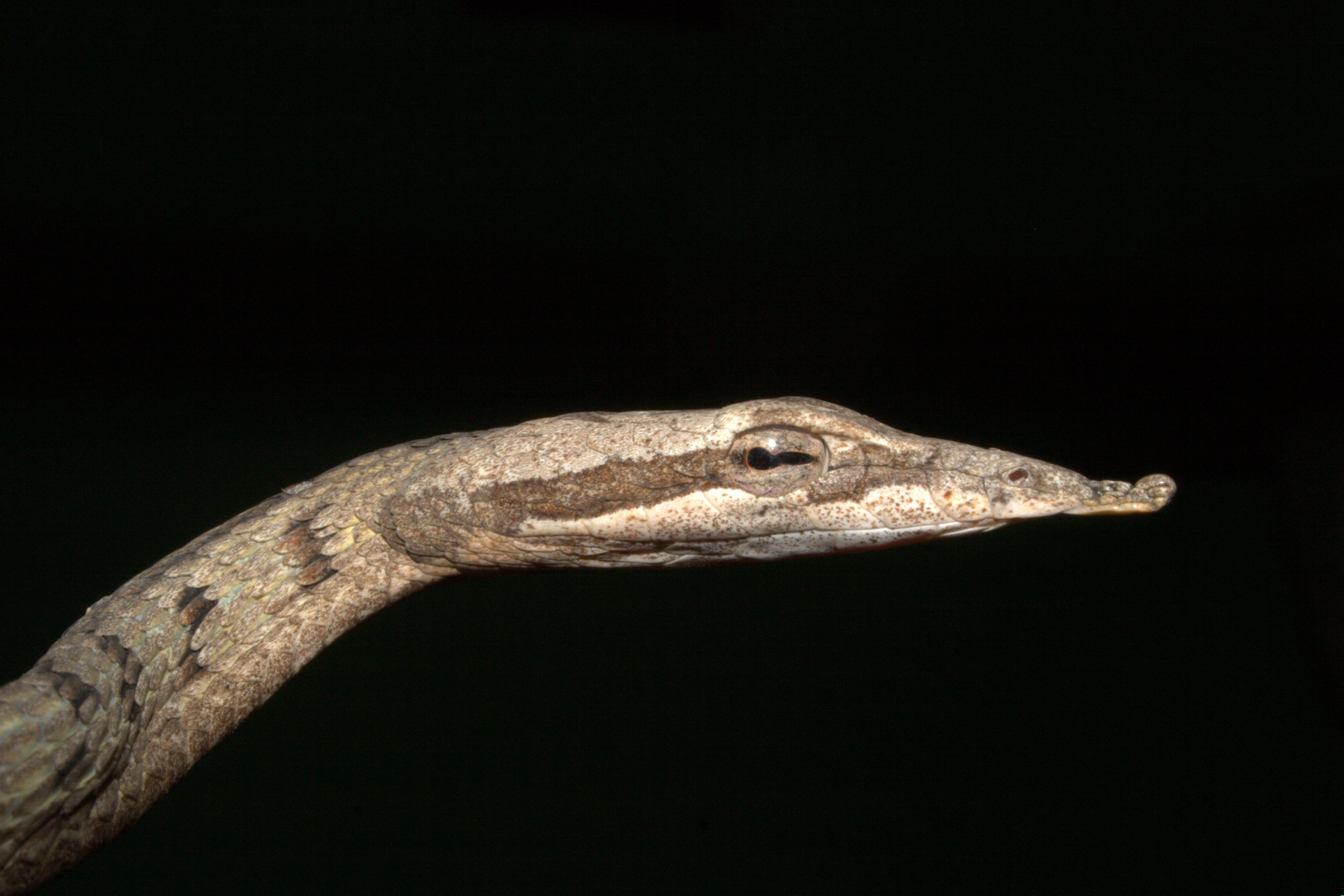
Head view and eye profile

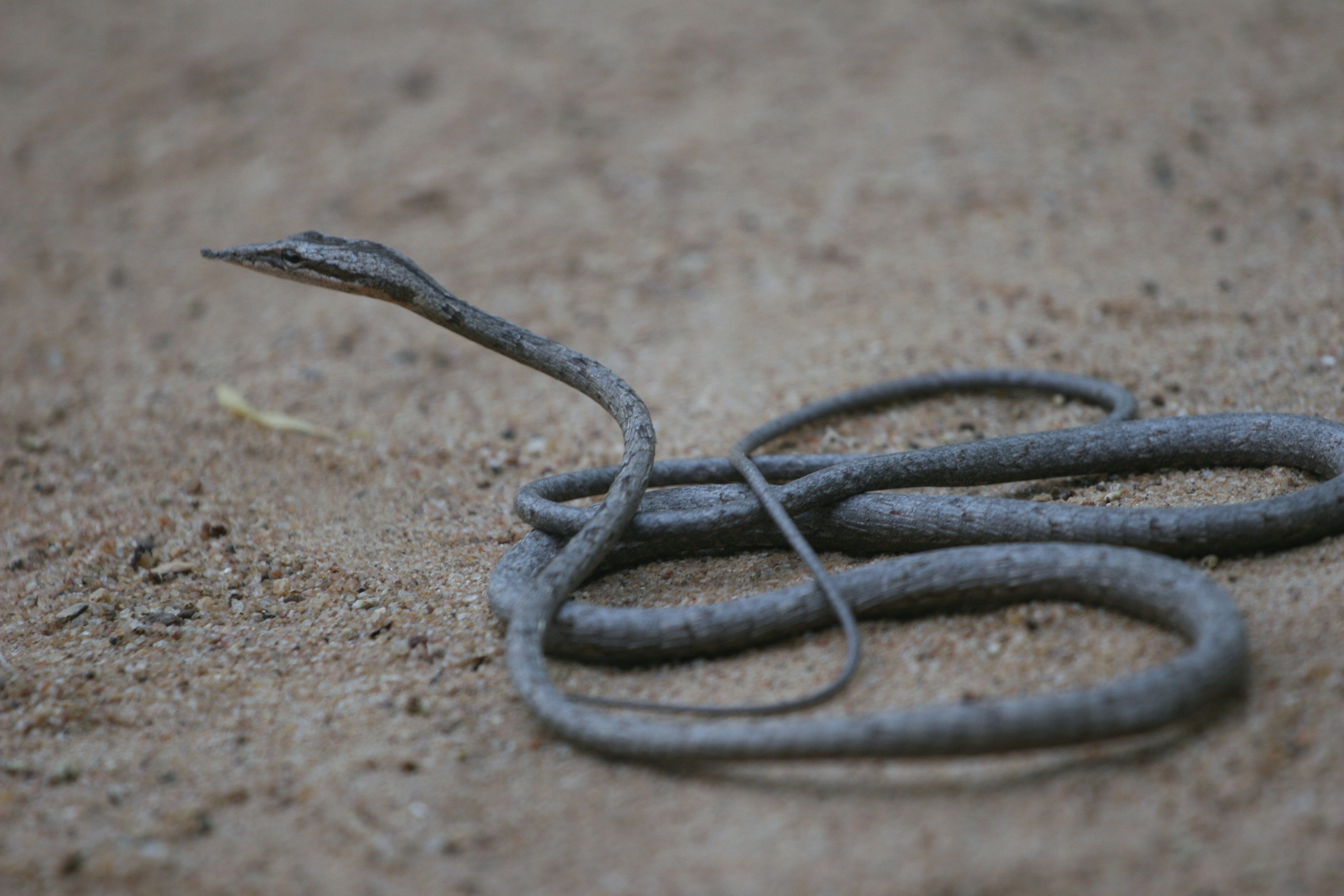

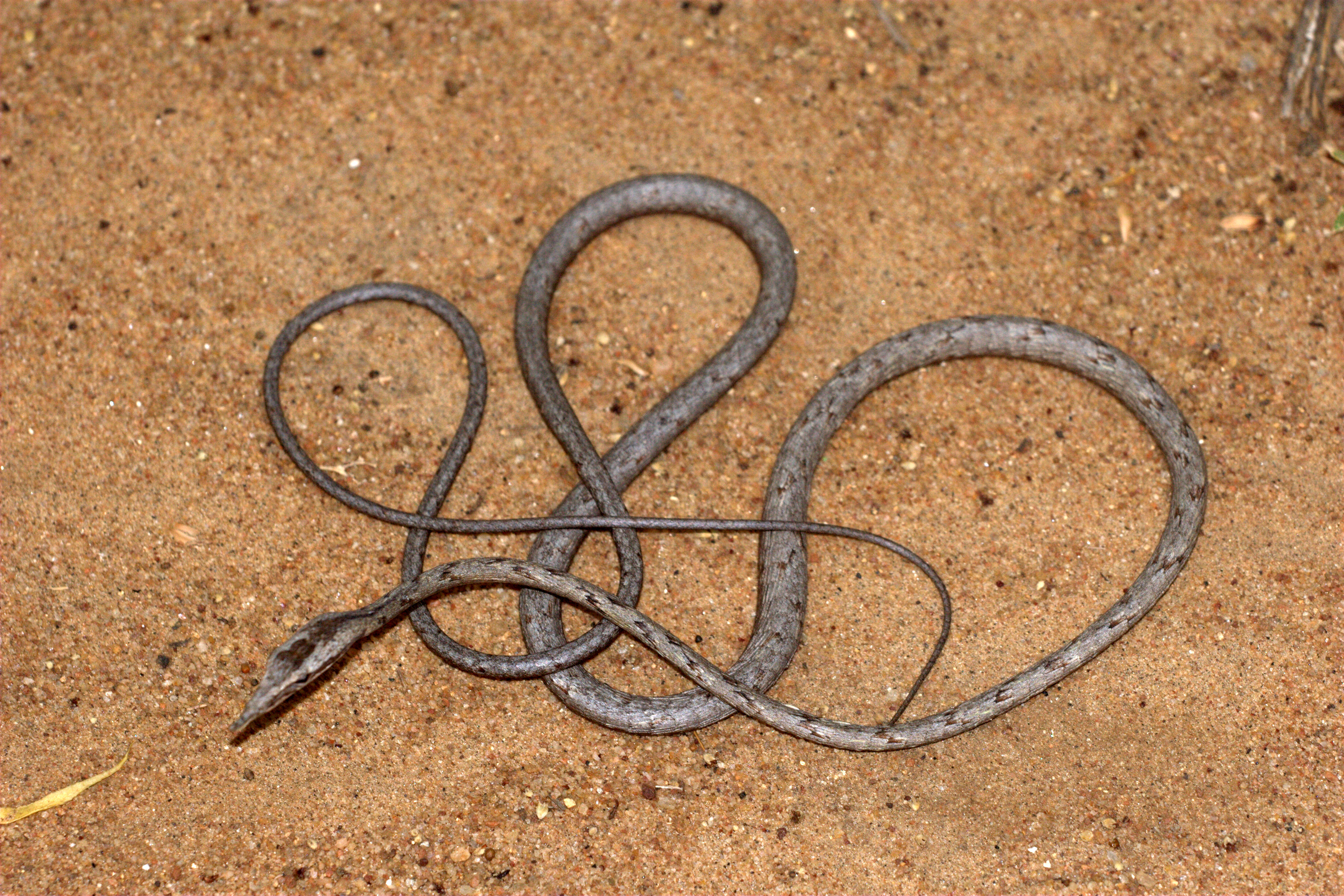
