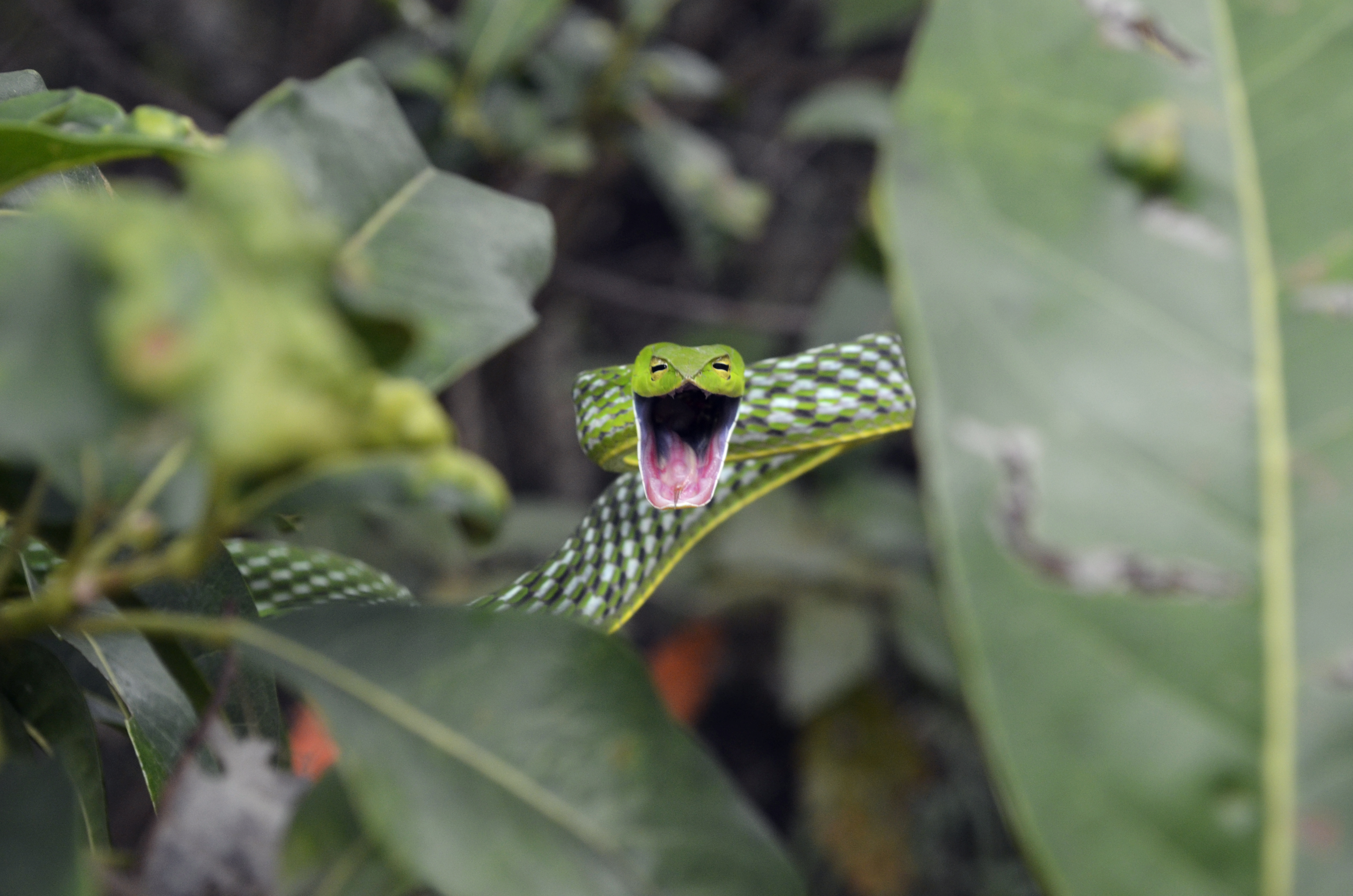
- In Kalakkad Mundanthurai Tiger Reserve, Tamil Nadu

Scientific classification
- Kingdom: Animalia
- Phylum: Chordata
- Class: Reptilia
- Order: Squamata
- Suborder: Serpentes
- Family: Colubridae
- Subfamily: Ahaetuliinae
- Genus: Ahaetulla
- Species: A. isabellina

Binomial name
- Ahaetulla isabellina (Wall, 1910)

Synonyms
- Dryophis mycterizans isabellinus Wall, 1910

= Ahaetulla isabellina =

Wall's vine snake

Species of snake

Ahaetulla isabellina, also known as Wall's vine snake, is a species of tree snake endemic to the southern Western Ghats of India.

== Taxonomy ==
It was formerly considered a subspecies of A. nasuta, which is now considered to only be endemic to Sri Lanka. A 2020 study found A. nasuta to be a species complex of A. nasuta sensu stricto as well as A. borealis, A. farnsworthi, A. isabellina, and A. malabarica, elevating A. isabellina to species. The specific epithet is a reference to the isabelline yellow coloration of the species' dorsal body in live condition, which distinguishes it from other species in the complex.

== Description ==
Body, very slender, bright green with blue obscure patches; in some specimens uniform olive to light brown. Rostral scale, infralabials and the midbody along venter are light green to light blue; sometimes there is a yellow ventral stripe along the notched ventral keels. Inter-scalar skin is white with black and white anteriorly-converging bars along forebody, becoming reddish along hindbody. Tail and subcaudals are green. The eye vary from yellow to orange with light brown marbled patterns; horizontal pupil with a light blue or yellow colouration around pupil. Adults can reach up to 1 m of total length.

In general, scalation shows the following intraspecific variations: ventrals 167–183 notched with keels; subcaudals (males) 159–167 divided and subcaudals (females) 105–149 divided; anal divided; scale rows around the body in 15-15–13/11 rows of smooth, obliquely disposed scales; supralabials 8–9, either 5th or 6th in contact with the eye; supralabial scale division on the 4th; infralabials 8–9; pre-suboculars 1 or 2; pre-ocular 1 (both left and right); postoculars 1 or 2; sub-oculars absent; temporals 1+2 or 2+2.

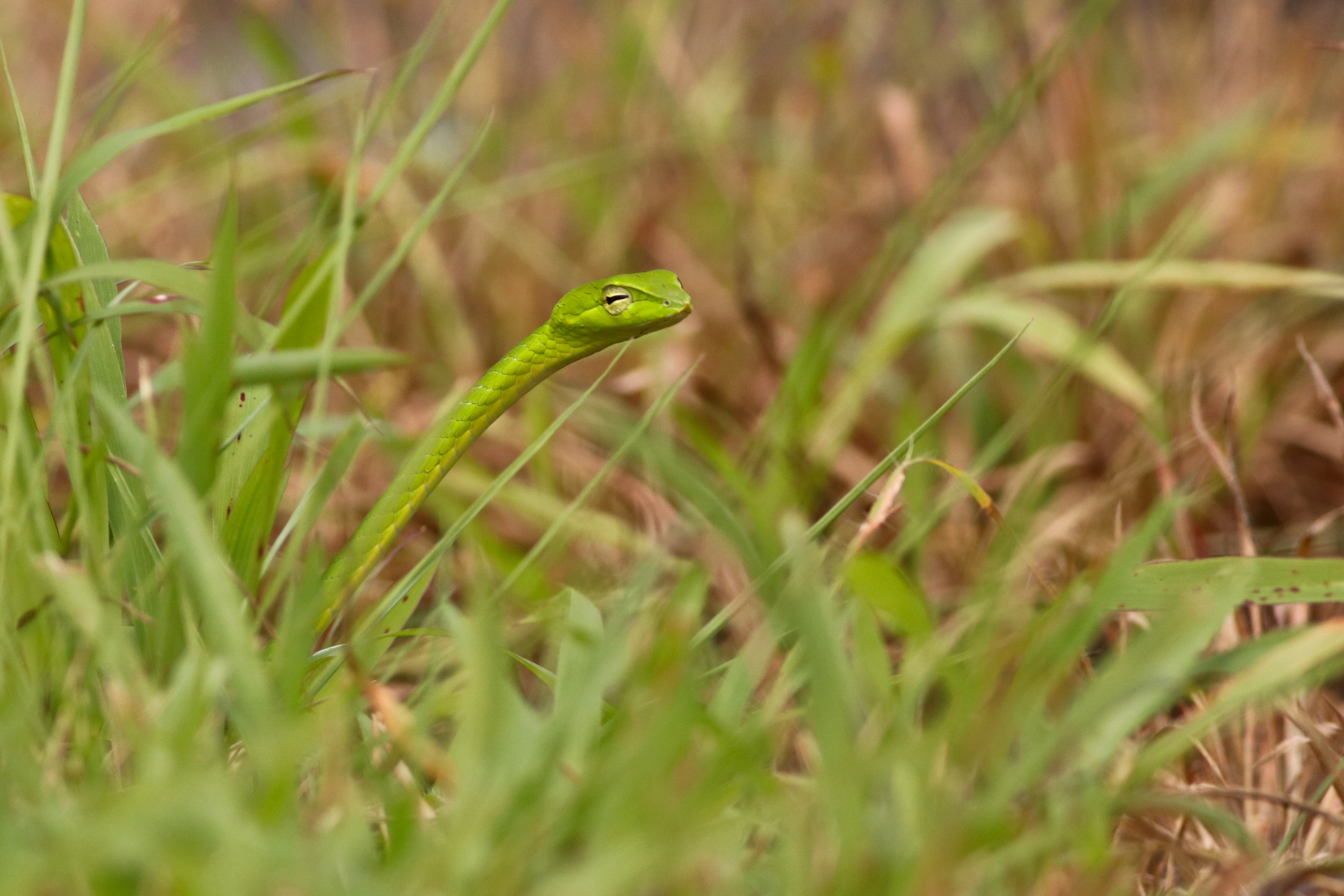
Ahaetulla isabellina from Western Ghats, Central Kerala

== Geographic range ==
This species is distributed in the southern Western Ghats in Tamil Nadu and Kerala south of the Palghat Gap, from the Anaimalai Hills south to Kalakkad reserve forest area, although more work is needed to determine the southern limit of the species' range.

== Habitat ==
This species is found in evergreen forests of the Western Ghats from ~550 m to 1475 above sea level.
