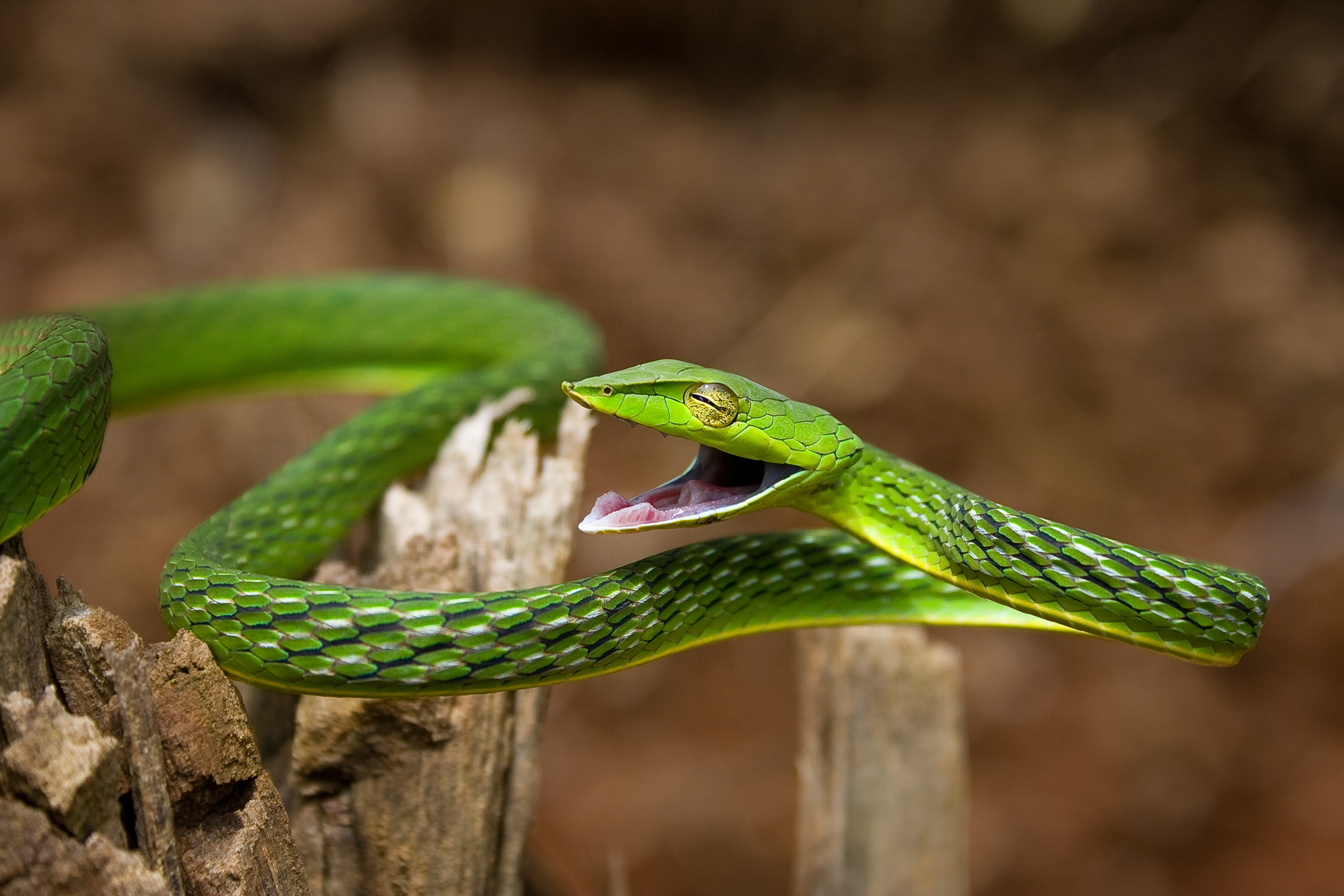
- In Agumbe, Karnataka

Scientific classification
- Kingdom: Animalia
- Phylum: Chordata
- Class: Reptilia
- Order: Squamata
- Suborder: Serpentes
- Family: Colubridae
- Subfamily: Ahaetuliinae
- Genus: Ahaetulla
- Species: A. farnsworthi

Binomial name
- Ahaetulla farnsworthi Mallik, Srikanthan, Pal, Princia D'Souza, Shanker, and Ganesh, 2020

= Ahaetulla farnsworthi =

Farnsworth's vine snake

Species of tree snake

Farnsworth's vine snake (Ahaetulla farnsworthi) is a species of tree snake endemic to the central Western Ghats of India.

== Taxonomy ==
It was formerly considered conspecific with A. nasuta, which is now considered to only be endemic to Sri Lanka. A 2020 study found A. nasuta to be a species complex of A. nasuta sensu stricto as well as A. borealis, A. farnsworthi, A. isabellina, and A. malabarica. The species is named after the character Professor Farnsworth from the American animated television series Futurama, as a reference to the character's efforts in resurrecting barking snakes from extinction.

== Description ==
The body is very slender. Adults can reach a total length of 1 m. Dorsum is uniform bright green to olive green. Rostral, infralabials and venter are yellowish green to light green at mid body; yellow to white ventral stripe along notched ventral keels; slight discolouration in the pre-ocular scale; inter-scalar skin white with black and white anteriorly-converging bars; white replaced by reddish brown inter-scalar skin posteriorly; eyes golden yellow with black speckles; concentration of black speckles both in the anterior and posterior ends of a horizontal pupil; slight discolouration around the pupil; tail, subcaudals green.

In general, scalation follows intraspecific variations: ventrals 167–177 notched with keels; subcaudals (males) 141–165, divided (females) 126–150, divided; anal divided; dorsal scale rows in 13/15/16–15-13/11 rows of smooth, obliquely disposed scales; supralabials 7–8, 5th supralabial in contact with the eye; 4th supralabial divided; loreal absent; infralabials 8–10; pre-suboculars 1–2; pre-ocular 1 (both left and right); post-oculars 2; sub-oculars absent; temporals 1+2 or 2+2 or 2+3.

== Geographic range ==
This species is endemic to the state of Karnataka, where it is distributed from Coorg to the Agumbe-Kodachadri range. It may be sympatric with A. malabarica in Coorg, but is largely separated from the species by rivers. Near the northern edge of its range it is flanked by A. borealis, from which it is likely separated by the Sharavathi River basin.

== Habitat ==
The species is found in mid-elevation tropical rainforests in the Central Western Ghats from 500 to 850 msl.
