= Green tree snake =

Green tree snake may refer to either of the following non-venomous snakes:

- Morelia viridis, the green tree python, a python species found in New Guinea, various islands in Indonesia, and the Cape York Peninsula in Australia
- Dendrelaphis calligaster, found in Indonesia (Waigeu, Batanta, Babar, Salawati, Tanimbar, Kai and Aru Islands, Mefoor, Jobi, Irian Jaya, Biak, Numfoor and Yapen; Ambon?), Solomon Islands, Papua New Guinea, and Australia
- Dendrelaphis punctulatus, the Australian tree snake, a colubrid species found in Australia and Papua New Guinea
