= D. inornatus =

D. inornatus may refer to:

- Dendrelaphis inornatus, a snake species in the genus Dendrelaphis
- Drymoips inornatus, a bird species in the genus Drymoips

== See also ==
- Inornatus
