= Dendrelaphis anthracina =

Scientific classification
- Kingdom: Animalia
- Phylum: Chordata
- Class: Reptilia
- Order: Squamata
- Suborder: Serpentes
- Family: Colubridae
- Subfamily: Ahaetuliinae
- Genus: Dendrelaphis
- Species: D. anthracina

Binomial name
- Dendrelaphis anthracina Kraus, 2025

Snake species

Dendrelaphis anthracina is a species of snake, found on Sudest Island of Milne Bay Province, Papua New Guinea.

== Description ==
Dendrelaphis anthracina is a large species of Dendrelaphis, with the adult snout-vent length being 9.6 cm (3.7 in) and its tail length being up to 4.6 cm (1.8 in). In terms of scales, males have 178-188 ventral scales and 134-139 subcaudal scales, while females have around 187 ventral scales, and 140-142 subcaudal scales.

=== Coloration ===
The snake's dorsum and most of its venter are uniformly black. The upper half of its supralabials are also black, whereas the lower half are white. The infralabial scales are predominantly white, with black spots.

=== Genitalia ===
The males of D. anthracina lack a terminal awn on their hemipenis. The hemipenes are ornamented proximally with a few whorls of large spines.

== Phylogeny ==
Dendrelaphis anthracina belongs to the D. papuensis group of Dendrelaphis.
