= Dendrelaphis oliveri =

Conservation status
- Data Deficient (IUCN 3.1)

Scientific classification
- Kingdom: Animalia
- Phylum: Chordata
- Order: Squamata
- Suborder: Serpentes
- Family: Colubridae
- Subfamily: Ahaetuliinae
- Genus: Dendrelaphis
- Species: D. oliveri

Binomial name
- Dendrelaphis oliveri (Taylor, 1950)

Synonyms
- Ahaetulla oliveri Taylor, 1950; Dendrelaphis oliveri — Das, 1996

Species of snake

Dendrelaphis oliveri, commonly known as Oliver's bronzeback, is a species of nonvenomous arboreal snake in the family Colubridae. The species is endemic to Sri Lanka. It is considered to be the rarest of the Sri Lankan Dendrelaphis species because there is only a single recorded specimen.

== Etymology ==
Both the specific name, oliveri, and the common name, Oliver's bronzeback, are in honor of American herpetologist James A. Oliver.

== Description ==
Similar to other bronzebacks, Dendrelaphis oliveri has enlarged dorsal scales, large eyes relative to its head size, the head clearly differentiated from the body, and a long slender body with a long tail.

It can be identified from its Sri Lankan cogeners by the combination of a lack of a loreal scale, the prefrontals contacting the 2nd, 3rd and 4th supralabials, and the 4th, 5th and 6th supralabials contacting the eye. Furthermore, it has an eye stripe that begins post-nasal and continues past the eye through to the base of the tail. Below this black ventrolateral line is a white ventrolateral line beginning at the posterior supralabials and continuing to the tail. This white ventrolateral line is bordered below by another black ventrolateral line that begins at the neck and continues to the tail.

The lack of a loreal scale is a character D. oliveri shares with Dendrelaphis effrenis in Sri Lanka. However, D. oliveri can be further identified from D. effrenis by its colour patterns and the following characters: prefrontals contacting the 2nd, 3rd and 4th supralabials (vs. only 2nd and 3rd), the presence of a ventrolateral stripe (vs. absent) and 2 postoculars (vs. 3).

The lack of a loreal scale is a character that is occasionally seen within the Dendrelaphis genus as an anomaly, but in the case of D. oliveri, this in combination with the presence of black-white-black ventrolateral lines is unique to it. All recorded specimens of D. efferenis show a lack of a loreal scale. These observations show, that the lack of a loreal scale is a key identifier of these two species.

== Distribution ==
Only one single specimen of Dendrelaphis oliveri has ever been recorded, and that is E.H. Taylor's original specimen from 1950. The specimen is in the collection of the Chicago Field Museum of Natural History.

The type-locality for D. oliveri is stated as north of Trincomalee based on Taylor's original catalog notes. However, this cannot be verified as no other specimen has been ever found since in the area. Therefore, it is possible that D. oliveri is not from this area and for that matter not from even Sri Lanka.

== Behavior ==
Dendrelaphis oliveri is arboreal and diurnal.

== Reproduction ==
Dendrelaphis oliveri is oviparous.
