= Yellow-bellied black snake =

There is no snake officially known as the "Yellow-bellied black snake". However, the term is used for several Australian snakes:

- Green tree snake (Dendrelaphis punctulata)
- Eastern tiger snake
- Red-bellied Black Snake
