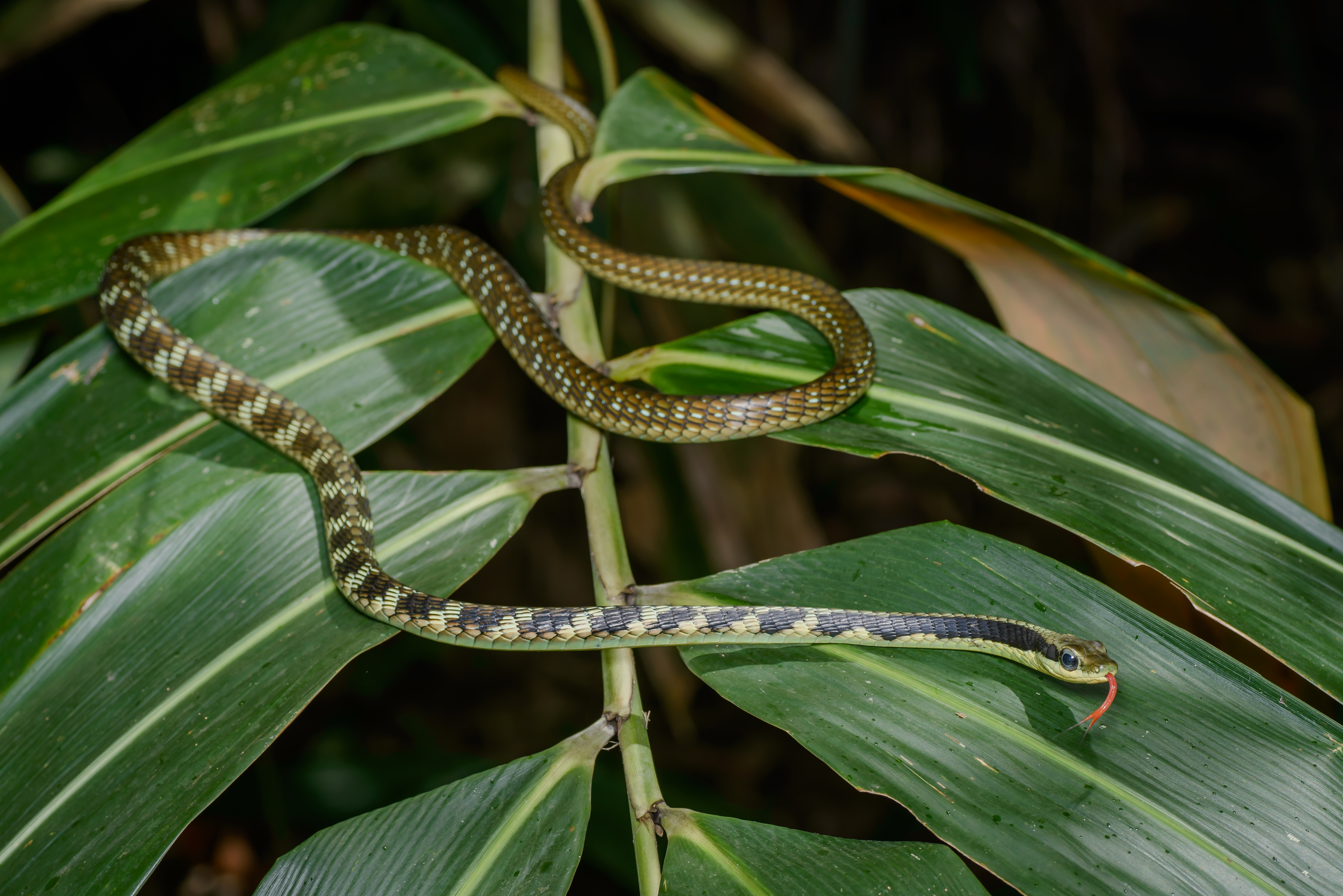
- Dendrelaphis nigroserratus from Kaeng Krachan National Park

Conservation status
- Least Concern (IUCN 3.1)

Scientific classification
- Kingdom: Animalia
- Phylum: Chordata
- Class: Reptilia
- Order: Squamata
- Suborder: Serpentes
- Family: Colubridae
- Subfamily: Ahaetuliinae
- Genus: Dendrelaphis
- Species: D. nigroserratus

Binomial name
- Dendrelaphis nigroserratus Vogel, van Rooijen & Hauser, 2012

= Dendrelaphis nigroserratus =

Sawtooth-necked bronzeback

Species of snake

Dendrelaphis nigroserratus (common name: sawtooth-necked bronzeback) is a species of snakes belonging to the bronzebacks (Dendrelaphis). It is found only in western and southwestern Thailand and the adjacent southeastern Myanmar. A specimen has been preserved in the British Natural History Museum, London since the early 20th century. Due to its resemblance to Wall's bronzeback, the scientific name was formerly assigned under Dendrelaphis cyanochloris, the species name for Wall's bronzeback. It was formally described as a distinct species in 2012 by Gernot Vogel, Johan Van Rooijen and Sjon Hauser. According to the World Wide Fund for Nature report, it became one of the 367 important new species discovered in the Greater Mekong during 2012 and 2013.

Analayses show its significant differences from the typical Wall's bronzeback, including colouration and scales on the neck. Its most distinctive feature is the presence of sawtooth-shaped scales on the back of its neck. This feature is unique among the bronzeback species, and the reason for its common name. In general, they are also larger, the largest specimen measuring 1.63 m in length.

It is classified as "Least Concern" under the IUCN Red List of Threatened Species of 2014.

== Description ==
Dendrelaphis nigroserratus is relatively large species among the bronzeback snakes. The holotype (QSMI 1282) is a juvenile female collected by Sjon Hauser in 2011 from Umphang District in Tak Province. It is 42.8 cm long, and its tail is 13.5 cm long, which is 31.5% of the total body length. Its eyes are conspicuous measuring 0.4 cm in diameter. The largest specimen is a dead female found on the road in Umphang District, and measures 1.63 m long. On average it is much longer than the closely related species such as Dendrelaphis cyanochloris and Dendrelaphis striatus. The general body colour is olive-brown. The head and back are greenish bronze, and the belly is yellowish or greyish green. It can be distinguished from other species from its thick black stripe behind the eye. The broad black streak is relatively broad on the head and runs from behind the eyes, continues as a broad bar on the neck where it breaks up incompletely. This splitting gives rise to a saw-toothed pattern, the reason for its common name as well as its specific epithet, nigroserratus (a Latin niger for "black", and serrare meaning "to saw"). Slightly posterior to this point, it splits completely into broad oblique bars that gradually disappear. This colour pattern in not seen in another species. It is a carnivore and is known to feed on frogs.

== Discovery ==
The first specimen collected was from Myeik (then Mergui) in Myanmar (then Burma) in the early 20th century. It was preserved in the Natural History Museum, London. It was regarded as member of the species Dendrelaphis cyanochloris (Wall's bronzeback) because of their fundamental similarities, including similar habitats. A systematic study in 2003 supported this identification. However, the common sawtooth-necked bronzeback has slight differences from the typical Wall's bronzeback. This distinction was analysed by Gernot Vogel of the Society for Southeast Asian Herpetology in Germany, Johan Van Rooijen of Netherlands Centre for Biodiversity Naturalis, and Sjon Hauser. They published their findings in 2012 in Zootaxa, reclassifying the snake as a new species. The holotype is deposited and maintained at the Queen Saovabha Memorial Institute (Bangkok Snake Farm on Rama IV Road) in Bangkok, Thailand.

== Distribution ==
Other than Mergui region in Myanmar, Dendrelaphis nigroserratus is found in isolated areas around the Thailand-Myanmar border, such as Phetchaburi, Kanchanaburi and Tak provinces. It is most abundant in southern Tak Province, where a number of road kills occur every year. They are found in the hill evergreen forests at elevations of over 800 metres, near streams and in bamboo thickets.
