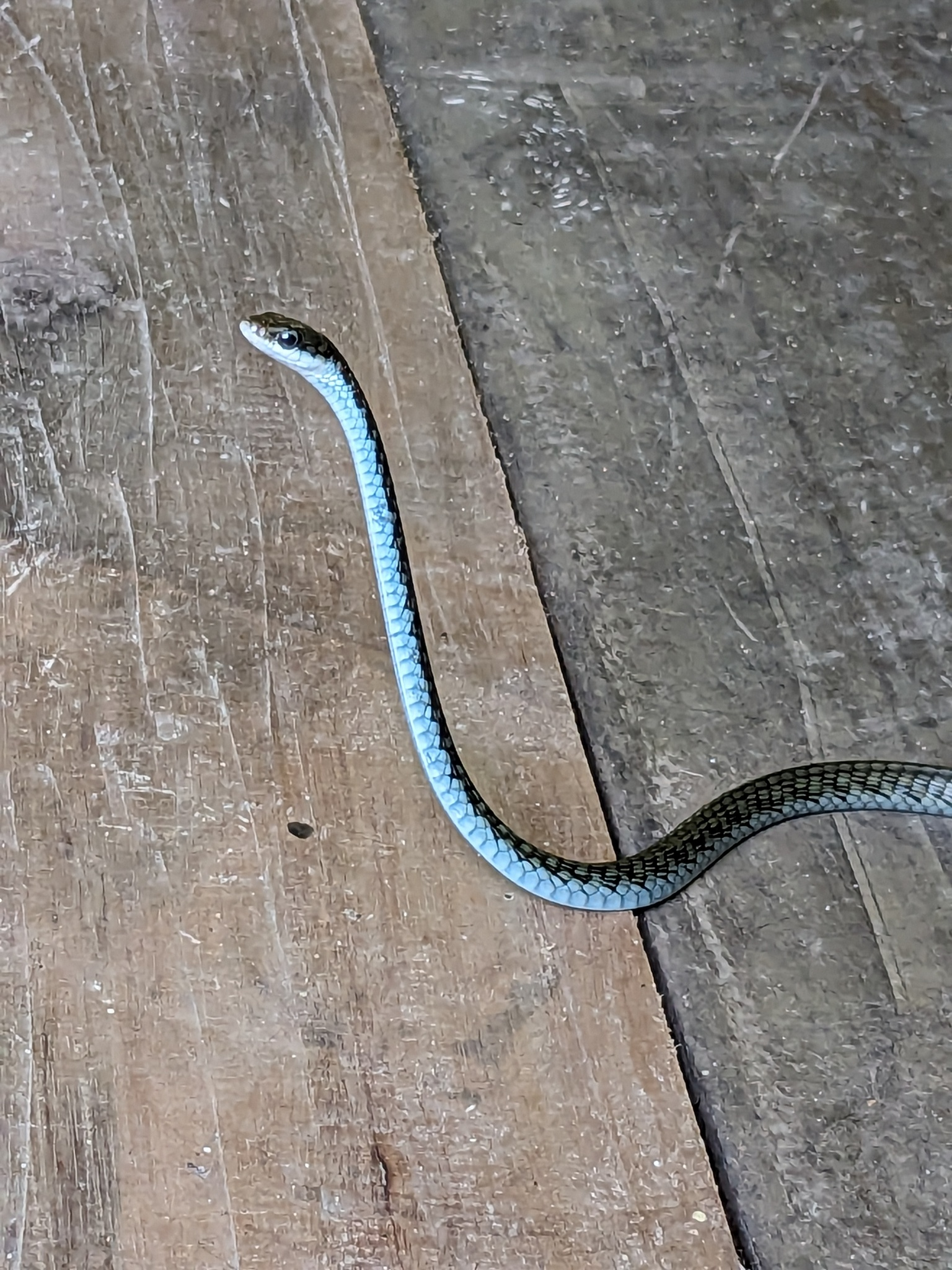

Scientific classification
- Kingdom: Animalia
- Phylum: Chordata
- Class: Reptilia
- Order: Squamata
- Suborder: Serpentes
- Family: Colubridae
- Subfamily: Ahaetuliinae
- Genus: Dendrelaphis
- Species: D. striolatus

Binomial name
- Dendrelaphis striolatus (Peters, 1867)

= Dendrelaphis striolatus =

Species of snake

Dendrelaphis striolatus, commonly known as the Palau tree snake, is a species of snake in the family Colubridae.

== Distribution ==
The snake is found in Palau.
