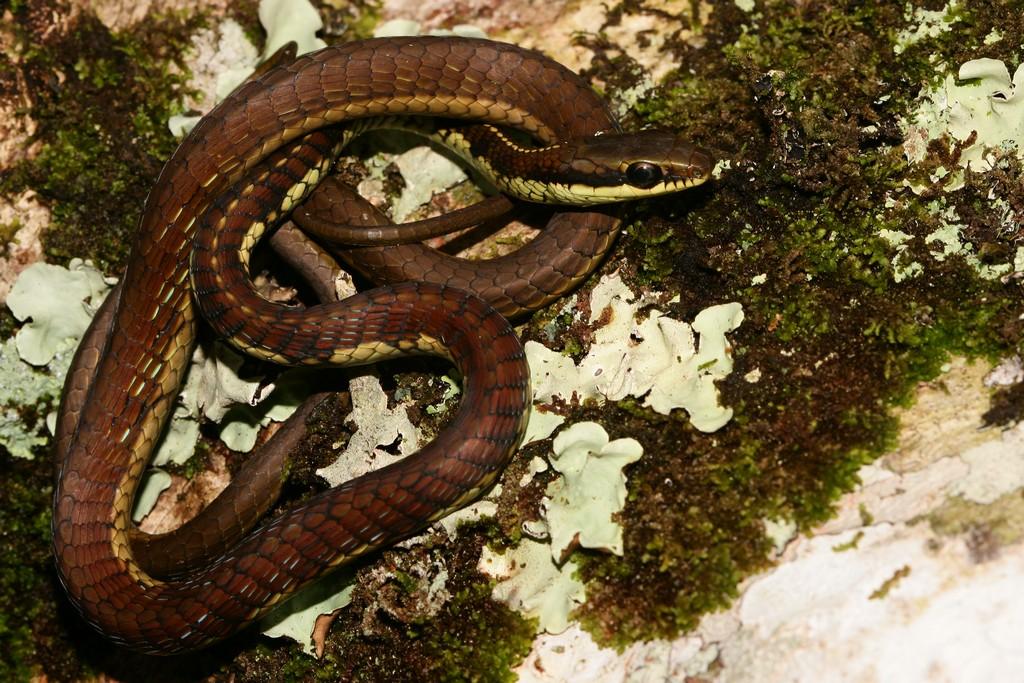

Conservation status
- Vulnerable (IUCN 3.1)

Scientific classification
- Kingdom: Animalia
- Phylum: Chordata
- Class: Reptilia
- Order: Squamata
- Suborder: Serpentes
- Family: Colubridae
- Subfamily: Ahaetuliinae
- Genus: Dendrelaphis
- Species: D. schokari

Binomial name
- Dendrelaphis schokari (Kuhl, 1820)

Synonyms
- Dipsas schokari Kuhl, 1820; Dendrophis helena F. Werner, 1893 (fide M.A. Smith, 1943); Dendrelaphis schokari — Rooijen & G. Vogel, 2008

= Schokar's bronzeback =

Species of snake

Dendrelaphis schokari, also known as the common bronze-back or Schokar's bronzeback (Sinhala: තරු/මූකලන් හාල්දන්ඩා, Tharu/Mookalan Haaldanda in Sinhala), is a species of non-venomous arboreal snake in the family Colubridae. The species is endemic to Sri Lanka.

== Taxonomy ==
Dendrelaphis schokari belongs to the genus Dendrelaphis, which contains 48 other described species.

Dendrelaphis is one of five genera belonging to the vine snake subfamily Ahaetuliinae, of which Dendrelaphis is most closely related to Chrysopelea, as shown in the cladogram below:

- Ahaetuliinae
  - sharp‑nosed snakes
    - - Ahaetulla
      - Proahaetulla
    - Dryophiops
  - broad‑nosed snakes
    - Dendrelaphis
      - - - - - Dendrelaphis marenae
              - Dendrelaphis haasi
            - Dendrelaphis pictus
          - - - Dendrelaphis ngansonensis
              - Dendrelaphis cyanochloris
            - Dendrelaphis striatus
        - Dendrelaphis formosus
      - - - - Dendrelaphis tristis
            - Dendrelaphis subocularis
          - Dendrelaphis schokari
        - - Dendrelaphis fuliginosus
          - Dendrelaphis caudolineatus
    - Chrysopelea

== Habitat ==
Dendrelaphis schokari inhabits forests and open areas of all climatic zones of the island of Sri Lanka, from lowlands to about 750 m (2,460 ft) above sea level. It is diurnal, and though a tree snake, it is observed foraging on land as well.

== Diet ==
Its prey consists of frogs, lizards, geckos, skinks, insects and also eggs of small birds. It can make long jumps among trees if necessary while chasing its prey.

== Description ==
It can be distinguished easily from other Dendrelaphis species by having a cream-colored spotted line on its olive green dorsum (back) from neck to mid fore body along the spine.

=== Formal description ===
Dendrelaphis schokari adult female: snout-to-vent length (SVL) 51 cm (20 in); tail 22.5 cm (8.9 in); 161 ventrals (2 preventrals); 113 subcaudals, all divided; anal shield divided; 1 loreal scale (L+R); 9 infralabials (L+R); first infralabials touch at the mental groove; first sublabial touches infralabials 6 and 7 (L+R); 9 supralabials (L+R), supralabials 5 and 6 touch the eye (L+R); 2 postoculars (L+R); temporal formula: 2+2 (L+R); dorsal formula: 15-15-11; vertebral scales enlarged but smaller than the scales of the first dorsal row; width of the dorsal scale at the position of the middle ventral 2.1 mm; eye-diameter 4.9 mm (L+R); distance anterior border of eye to posterior border of nostril 4.5 mm (L+R); a dark postocular stripe starts behind the eye, covers only the lower quarter of the temporal region and ends at the edge of the jaw; a vertebral stripe, formed by yellow spots on the vertebral scales, starts behind the head and is no longer visible after the level of the 34th ventral scale; an interparietal spot is absent; a faint light ventrolateral line is present, not bordered by black lines; ground color brown, based on the color of unshed skin; supralabials and throat yellow; ventrals yellow anteriorly, yellowish-green posteriorly.
