= Dendrelaphis terrificus =

Conservation status
- Least Concern (IUCN 3.1)

Scientific classification
- Kingdom: Animalia
- Phylum: Chordata
- Class: Reptilia
- Order: Squamata
- Suborder: Serpentes
- Family: Colubridae
- Subfamily: Ahaetuliinae
- Genus: Dendrelaphis
- Species: D. terrificus

Binomial name
- Dendrelaphis terrificus (Peters, 1872)

Species of snake

Dendrelaphis terrificus, the terrific bronzeback, is a species of snake in the family Colubridae. The species is found in Indonesia.
