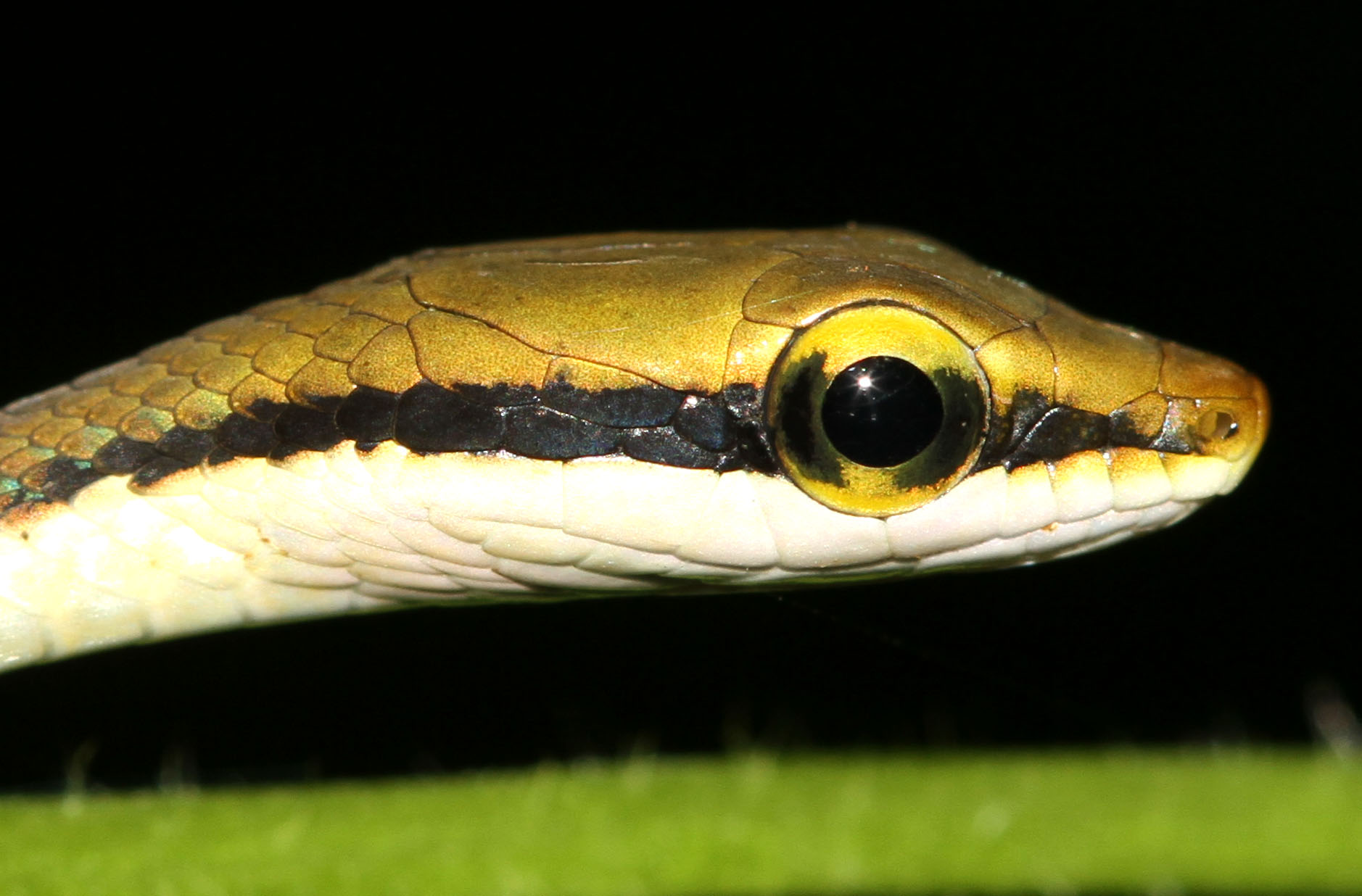

Conservation status
- Least Concern (IUCN 3.1)

Scientific classification
- Kingdom: Animalia
- Phylum: Chordata
- Class: Reptilia
- Order: Squamata
- Suborder: Serpentes
- Family: Colubridae
- Subfamily: Ahaetuliinae
- Genus: Dendrelaphis
- Species: D. girii

Binomial name
- Dendrelaphis girii Vogel & Van Rooijen, 2011

= Dendrelaphis girii =

Species of reptile

Dendrelaphis girii, Giri's bronzeback tree snake or Giri's bronzeback, is a species of diurnal, arboreal, Colubrid snake endemic to the Western Ghats of southwestern India.

== Description ==
A species of Dendrelaphis characterised by the combination of: 1) two loreal scales on each side of the head; 2) 15 dorsal scale rows at midbody; 3) enlarged vertebral scales; 4) 166–173 ventrals; 5) 140–147 subcaudals; 6) 8–9 supralabials, 2 supralabials border the eye; 7) 6–8 temporal scales; 8) a long sublabial that touches 2-5 infralabials; 9) 1–3 gular rows; 10) a divided anal shield; 11) relative tail-length 0.36–0.37; 12) a black postocular stripe that covers less than a quarter of the temporal region and that barely extends onto the neck; 13) an absent or rudimentarily present pale ventrolateral line.

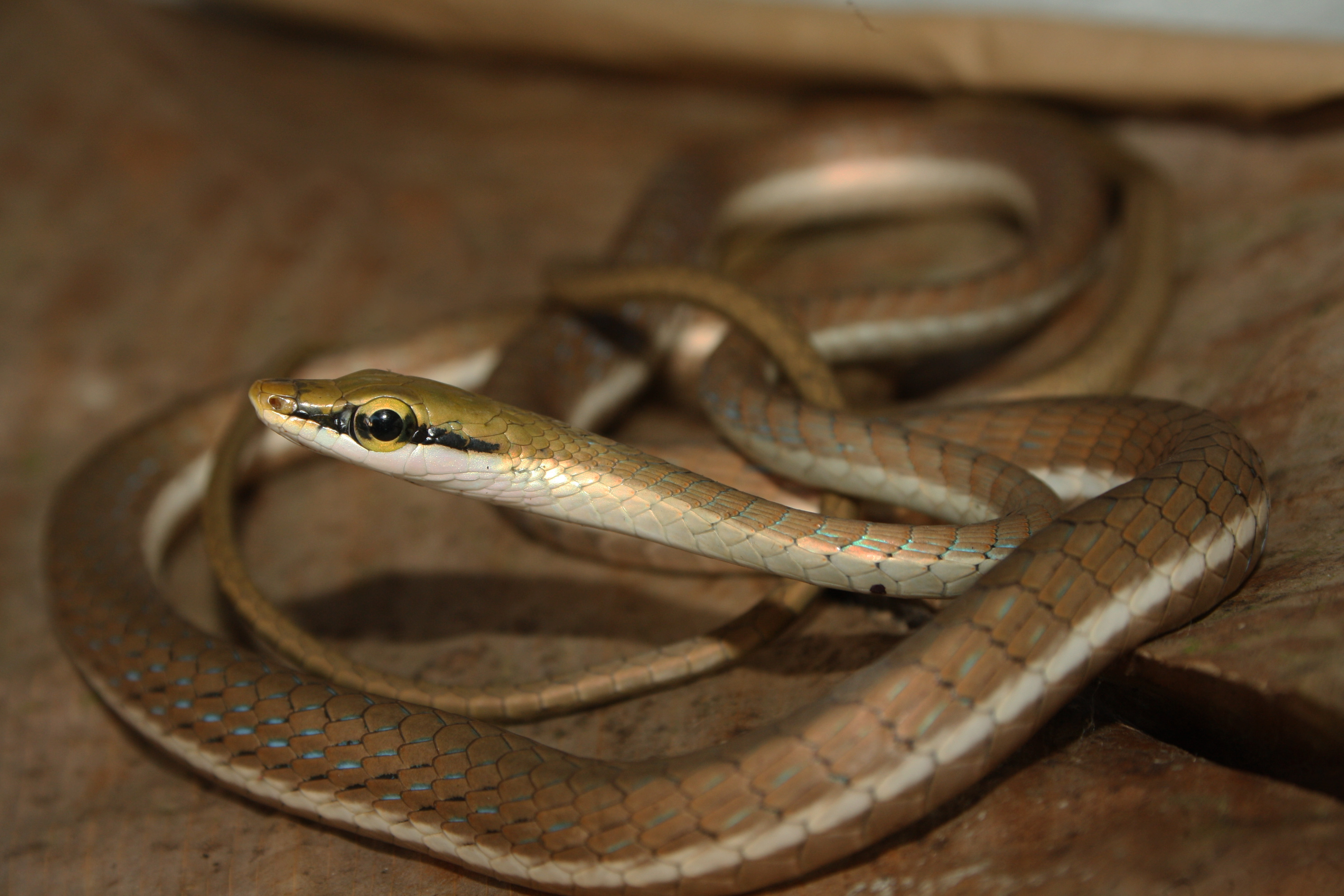
Giri's bronzeback tree snake(Dendrelaphis girii) from Kozhikode, Kerala

== Etymology ==
Named after Varad Giri, the curator of the herpetological collection of the Bombay Natural History Society. He contributed enormously to the knowledge of the Indian reptiles by his own research and by making the BNHS collection easily available for all kind of researchers.
