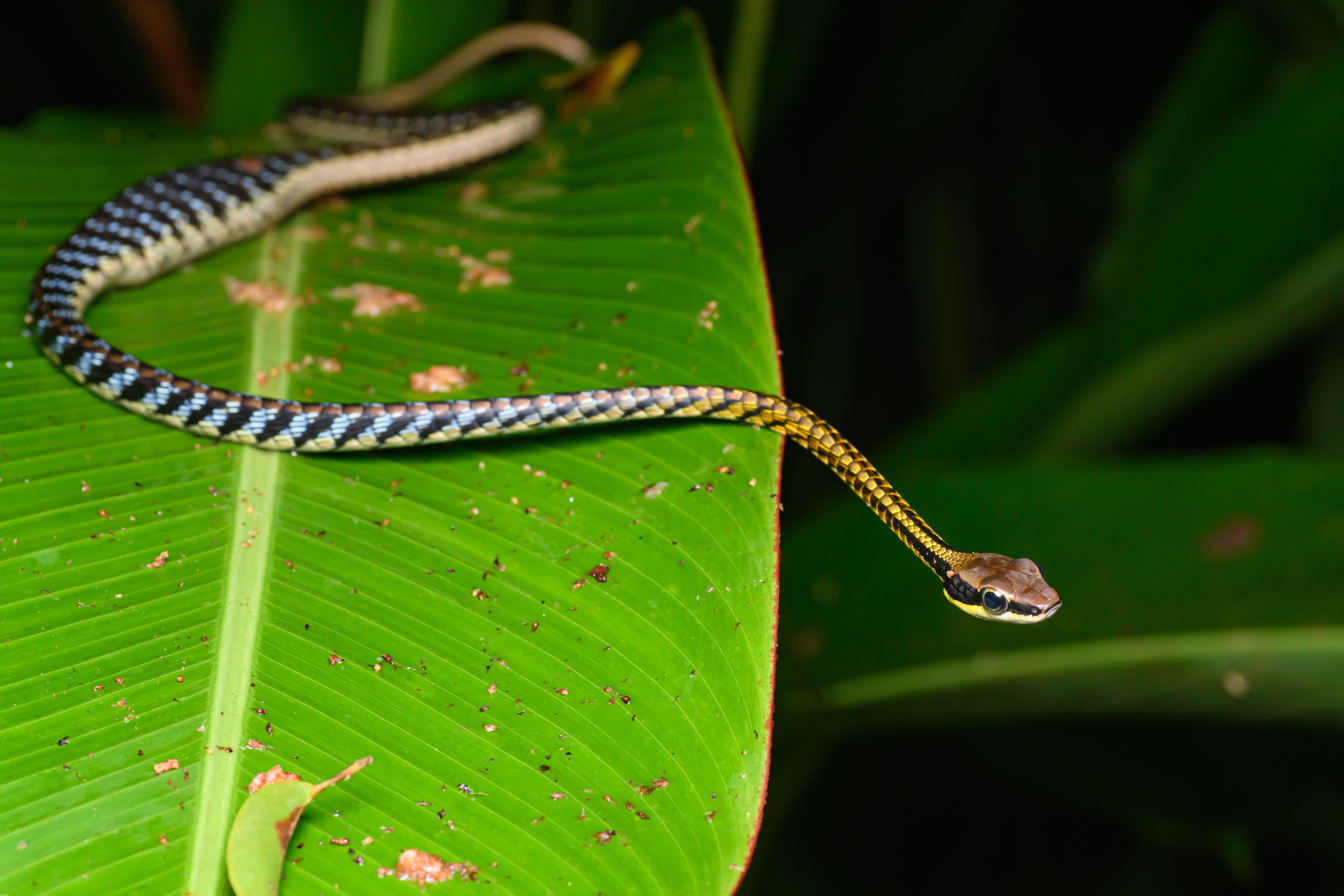

Conservation status
- Least Concern (IUCN 3.1)

Scientific classification
- Kingdom: Animalia
- Phylum: Chordata
- Order: Squamata
- Suborder: Serpentes
- Family: Colubridae
- Subfamily: Ahaetuliinae
- Genus: Dendrelaphis
- Species: D. striatus

Binomial name
- Dendrelaphis striatus (Cohn, 1905)

= Dendrelaphis striatus =

Species of snake

Dendrelaphis striatus, commonly known as the banded bronzeback or striated bronzeback treesnake, is a species of snake of the family Colubridae found in Southeast Asia.

== Taxonomy ==
Dendrelaphis striatus belongs to the genus Dendrelaphis, which contains 48 other described species.

Dendrelaphis is one of five genera belonging to the vine snake subfamily Ahaetuliinae, of which Dendrelaphis is most closely related to Chrysopelea, as shown in the cladogram below:

- Ahaetuliinae
  - sharp‑nosed snakes
    - - Ahaetulla
      - Proahaetulla
    - Dryophiops
  - broad‑nosed snakes
    - Dendrelaphis
      - - - - - Dendrelaphis marenae
              - Dendrelaphis haasi
            - Dendrelaphis pictus
          - - - Dendrelaphis ngansonensis
              - Dendrelaphis cyanochloris
            - Dendrelaphis striatus
        - Dendrelaphis formosus
      - - - - Dendrelaphis tristis
            - Dendrelaphis subocularis
          - Dendrelaphis schokari
        - - Dendrelaphis fuliginosus
          - Dendrelaphis caudolineatus
    - Chrysopelea

== Geographic range ==
Dendrelaphis striatus is found in Indonesia, Malaysia, and Thailand.

== Behavior ==
The snake is diurnal and fully arboreal, and has oviparous reproduction.
