= Dendrelaphis proarchos =

Scientific classification
- Kingdom: Animalia
- Phylum: Chordata
- Class: Reptilia
- Order: Squamata
- Suborder: Serpentes
- Family: Colubridae
- Subfamily: Ahaetuliinae
- Genus: Dendrelaphis
- Species: D. proarchos

Binomial name
- Dendrelaphis proarchos (Wall, 1909)

Synonyms
- Dendrophis proarchos Wall, 1909

Species of snake

Dendrelaphis proarchos is a species of snake of the family Colubridae.

== Geographic range ==
The snake is found in Northeast India, Bhutan, Bangladesh, Myanmar, Laos, Vietnam, and China.

== Description ==
Dendrelaphis proarchos can reach at least 121 cm (4.0 ft) in total length. The tail is long, making about one third of the total length (range 30–36%).
