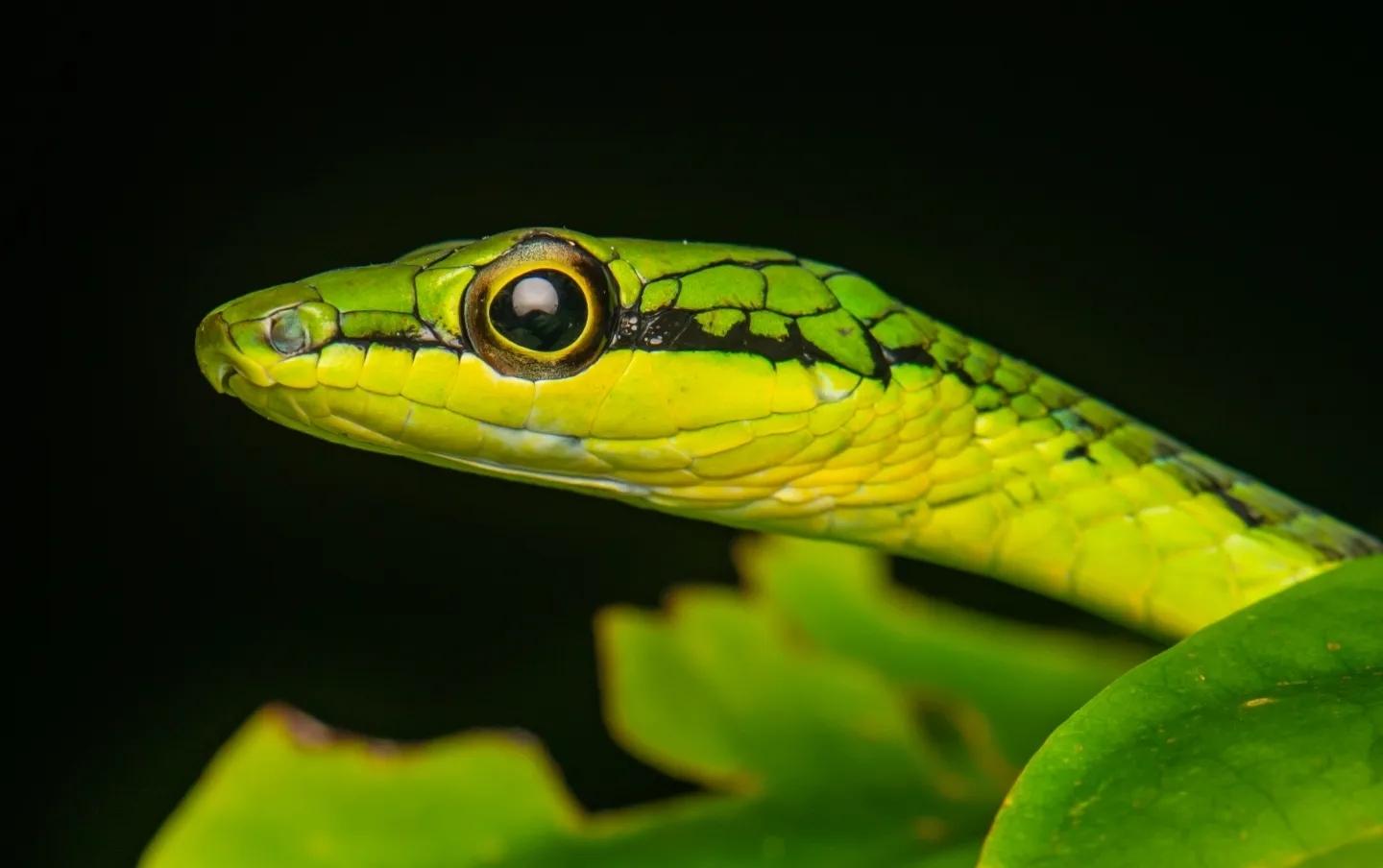

Conservation status
- Least Concern (IUCN 3.1)

Scientific classification
- Kingdom: Animalia
- Phylum: Chordata
- Class: Reptilia
- Order: Squamata
- Suborder: Serpentes
- Family: Colubridae
- Subfamily: Ahaetuliinae
- Genus: Dendrelaphis
- Species: D. andamanensis

Binomial name
- Dendrelaphis andamanensis (Anderson, 1871)

= Dendrelaphis andamanensis =

Species of snake

Dendrelaphis andamanensis, the Andaman bronzeback, is a species of snake in the family Colubridae. The species is found on the Andaman Islands in India.

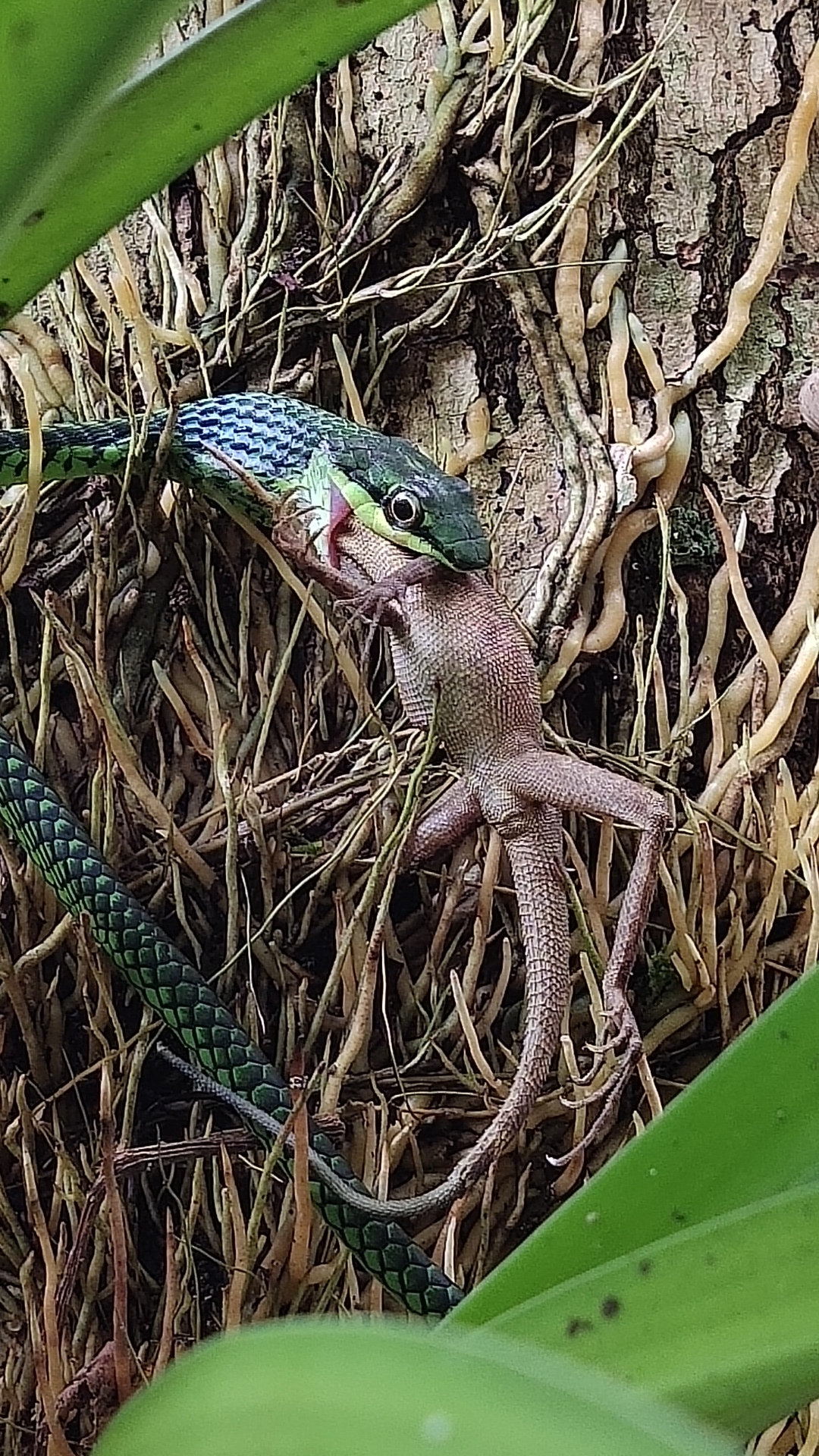
Eating a lizard
