= Dendrelaphis lineolatus =

Scientific classification
- Kingdom: Animalia
- Phylum: Chordata
- Class: Reptilia
- Order: Squamata
- Suborder: Serpentes
- Family: Colubridae
- Subfamily: Ahaetuliinae
- Genus: Dendrelaphis
- Species: D. lineolatus

Binomial name
- Dendrelaphis lineolatus (Jacquinot & Guichenot, 1853)

Species of snake

Dendrelaphis lineolatus is a species of snake in the family Colubridae. The species is found in Indonesia and Papua New Guinea.
