= Dendrelaphis ngansonensis =

Conservation status
- Least Concern (IUCN 3.1)

Scientific classification
- Kingdom: Animalia
- Phylum: Chordata
- Order: Squamata
- Suborder: Serpentes
- Family: Colubridae
- Subfamily: Ahaetuliinae
- Genus: Dendrelaphis
- Species: D. ngansonensis

Binomial name
- Dendrelaphis ngansonensis (Bourret, 1935)

Synonyms
- Dendrophis pictus ngansonensis Bourret, 1935

Species of snake

Dendrelaphis ngansonensis, commonly known as either the Nganson bronzeback or Nganson bronzeback tree snake, is a species of snake in the family Colubridae, sound in Southeast Asia.

== Etymology ==
The species name ngansonensis is named after the type locality of the Ngân Sơn district of Tonkin, North Vietnam.

== Taxonomy ==
Dendrelaphis ngansonensis belongs to the genus Dendrelaphis, which contains 48 other described species. D. ngansonensis is most closely related to Dendrelaphis cyanochloris, and together the two might form a species complex.

Dendrelaphis is one of five genera belonging to the vine snake subfamily Ahaetuliinae, of which Dendrelaphis is most closely related to Chrysopelea, as shown in the cladogram below:

- Ahaetuliinae
  - sharp‑nosed snakes
    - - Ahaetulla
      - Proahaetulla
    - Dryophiops
  - broad‑nosed snakes
    - Dendrelaphis
      - - - - - Dendrelaphis marenae
              - Dendrelaphis haasi
            - Dendrelaphis pictus
          - - - Dendrelaphis ngansonensis
              - Dendrelaphis cyanochloris
            - Dendrelaphis striatus
        - Dendrelaphis formosus
      - - - - Dendrelaphis tristis
            - Dendrelaphis subocularis
          - Dendrelaphis schokari
        - - Dendrelaphis fuliginosus
          - Dendrelaphis caudolineatus
    - Chrysopelea

== Distribution ==
The species is found in Vietnam, Laos, Thailand, Cambodia, and southwestern China (Yunnan).

== Habitat and behaviour ==
Dendrelaphis ngansonensis is an arboreal snake that occurs in both primary and secondary forests. It preys upon small vertebrates. It has been found to be both diurnal and nocturnal, and has oviparous reproduction.
