= Dendrelaphis vogeli =

Scientific classification
- Kingdom: Animalia
- Phylum: Chordata
- Class: Reptilia
- Order: Squamata
- Suborder: Serpentes
- Family: Colubridae
- Subfamily: Ahaetuliinae
- Genus: Dendrelaphis
- Species: D. vogeli

Binomial name
- Dendrelaphis vogeli Jiang, Guo, Ren, & Li, 2020

Species of snake

Dendrelaphis vogeli, Vogel's bronzeback, is a species of snake in the family Colubridae. The species is found in China and Thailand.
