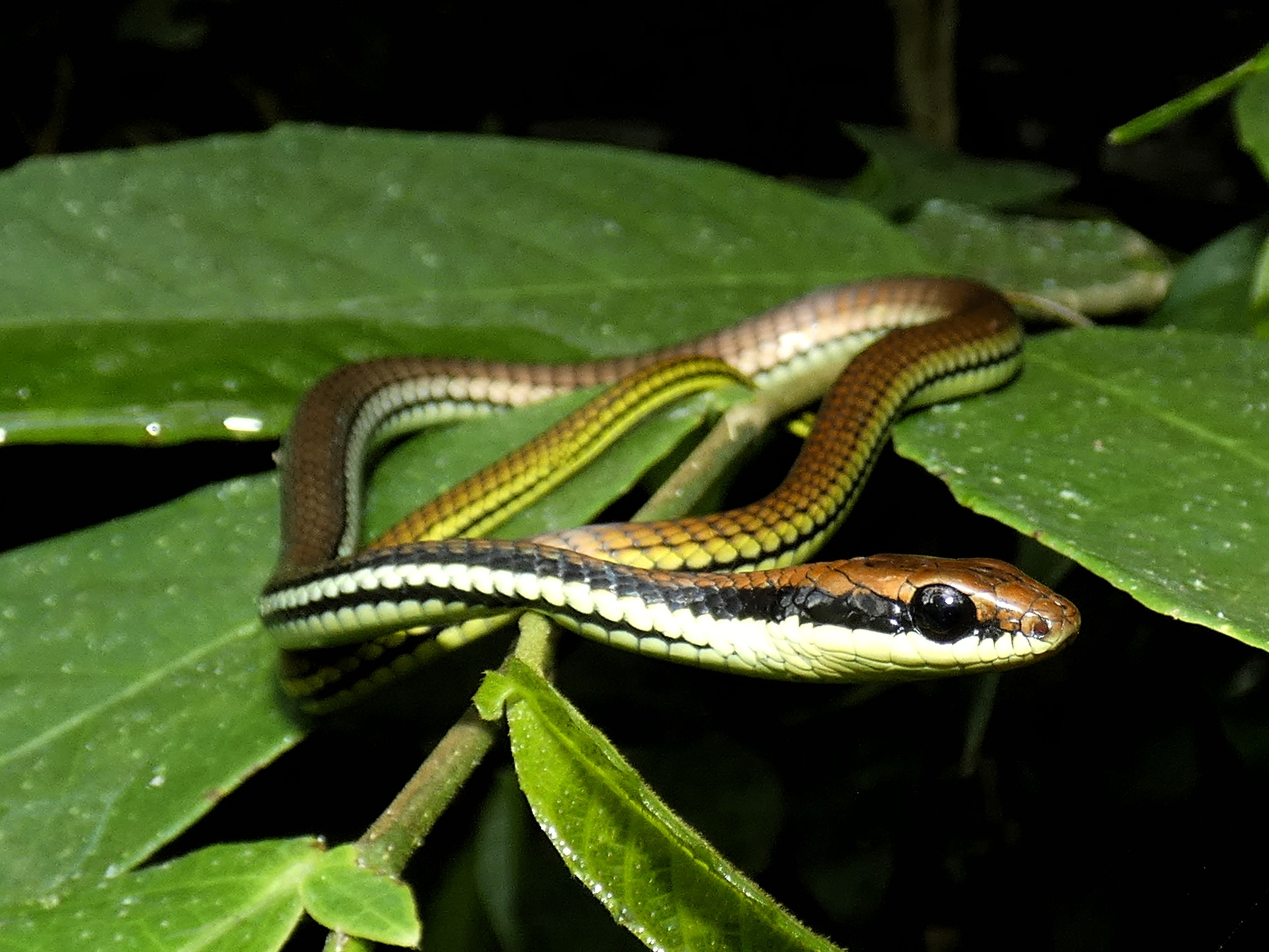
- Philippine bronzeback observed in Southern Leyte

Conservation status
- Least Concern (IUCN 3.1)

Scientific classification
- Kingdom: Animalia
- Phylum: Chordata
- Class: Reptilia
- Order: Squamata
- Suborder: Serpentes
- Family: Colubridae
- Subfamily: Ahaetuliinae
- Genus: Dendrelaphis
- Species: D. philippinensis

Binomial name
- Dendrelaphis philippinensis (Günther, 1879)

= Dendrelaphis philippinensis =

Species of snake

Dendrelaphis philippinensis, the Philippine bronzeback treesnake, is a species of snake of the family Colubridae.

== Geographic range ==
The snake is found in the Philippines.
