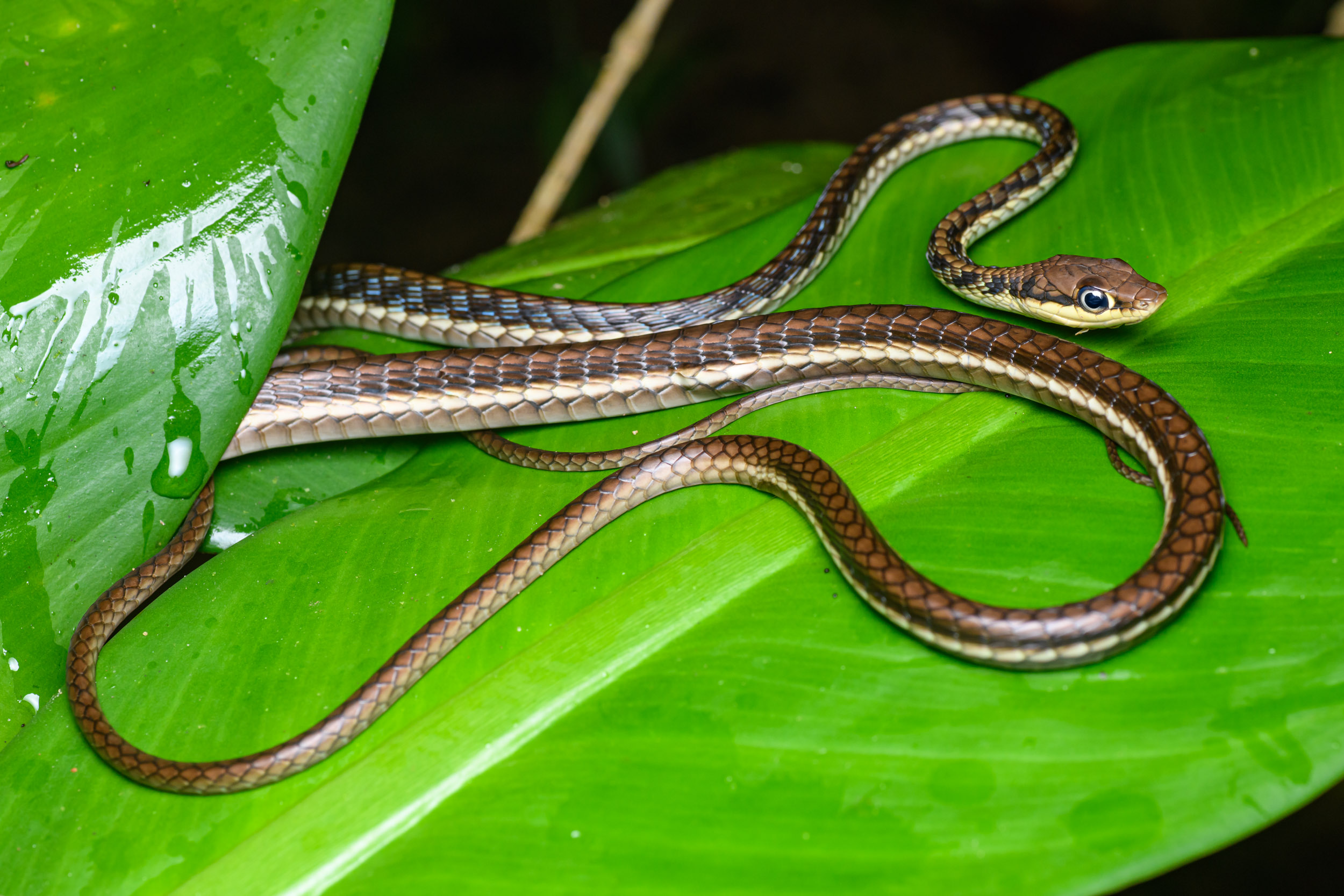

Conservation status
- Least Concern (IUCN 3.1)

Scientific classification
- Kingdom: Animalia
- Phylum: Chordata
- Class: Reptilia
- Order: Squamata
- Suborder: Serpentes
- Family: Colubridae
- Subfamily: Ahaetuliinae
- Genus: Dendrelaphis
- Species: D. haasi

Binomial name
- Dendrelaphis haasi van Rooijen & G. Vogel, 2008

= Dendrelaphis haasi =

Species of snake

Dendrelaphis haasi, also known commonly as Haas' bronzeback, Haas's bronzeback, Haas's bronzeback snake, and Haas's bronzeback tree snake, is a species of snake in the family Colubridae. The species is native to Southeast Asia.

== Etymology ==
The specific name, haasi, is in honor of Dutch herpetologist C.P.J. de Haas.

== Taxonomy ==
Dendrelaphis haasi belongs to the genus Dendrelaphis, which contains 48 other described species.

Dendrelaphis is one of five genera belonging to the vine snake subfamily Ahaetuliinae, of which Dendrelaphis is most closely related to Chrysopelea, as shown in the cladogram below:

- Ahaetuliinae
  - sharp‑nosed snakes
    - - Ahaetulla
      - Proahaetulla
    - Dryophiops
  - broad‑nosed snakes
    - Dendrelaphis
      - - - - - Dendrelaphis marenae
              - Dendrelaphis haasi
            - Dendrelaphis pictus
          - - - Dendrelaphis ngansonensis
              - Dendrelaphis cyanochloris
            - Dendrelaphis striatus
        - Dendrelaphis formosus
      - - - - Dendrelaphis tristis
            - Dendrelaphis subocularis
          - Dendrelaphis schokari
        - - Dendrelaphis fuliginosus
          - Dendrelaphis caudolineatus
    - Chrysopelea

== Geographic range ==
D. haasi is found in Bangladesh, Brunei, Indonesia, Malaysia, and Singapore.

== Habitat ==
The preferred natural habitat of D. haasi is forest, at altitudes near to sea level, but it has also been found in gardens.

== Description ==
D. haasi is slender and has a very long tail, which is 34% to 38% of its total length. The holotype has a snout-to-vent length of 57.5 cm (22.6 in), plus a tail length of 33 cm (13 in).

== Behavior ==
D. haasi is diurnal and fully arboreal.

== Diet ==
D. haasi preys upon frogs and lizards.

== Reproduction ==
D. haasi is oviparous.
