= Dendrelaphis gastrostictus =

Conservation status
- Least Concern (IUCN 3.1)

Scientific classification
- Kingdom: Animalia
- Phylum: Chordata
- Class: Reptilia
- Order: Squamata
- Suborder: Serpentes
- Family: Colubridae
- Subfamily: Ahaetuliinae
- Genus: Dendrelaphis
- Species: D. gastrostictus

Binomial name
- Dendrelaphis gastrostictus (Boulenger, 1894)

Species of snake

Dendrelaphis gastrostictus, the montane tree snake, is a species of snake in the family Colubridae. The species is found in Papua New Guinea and Indonesia.
