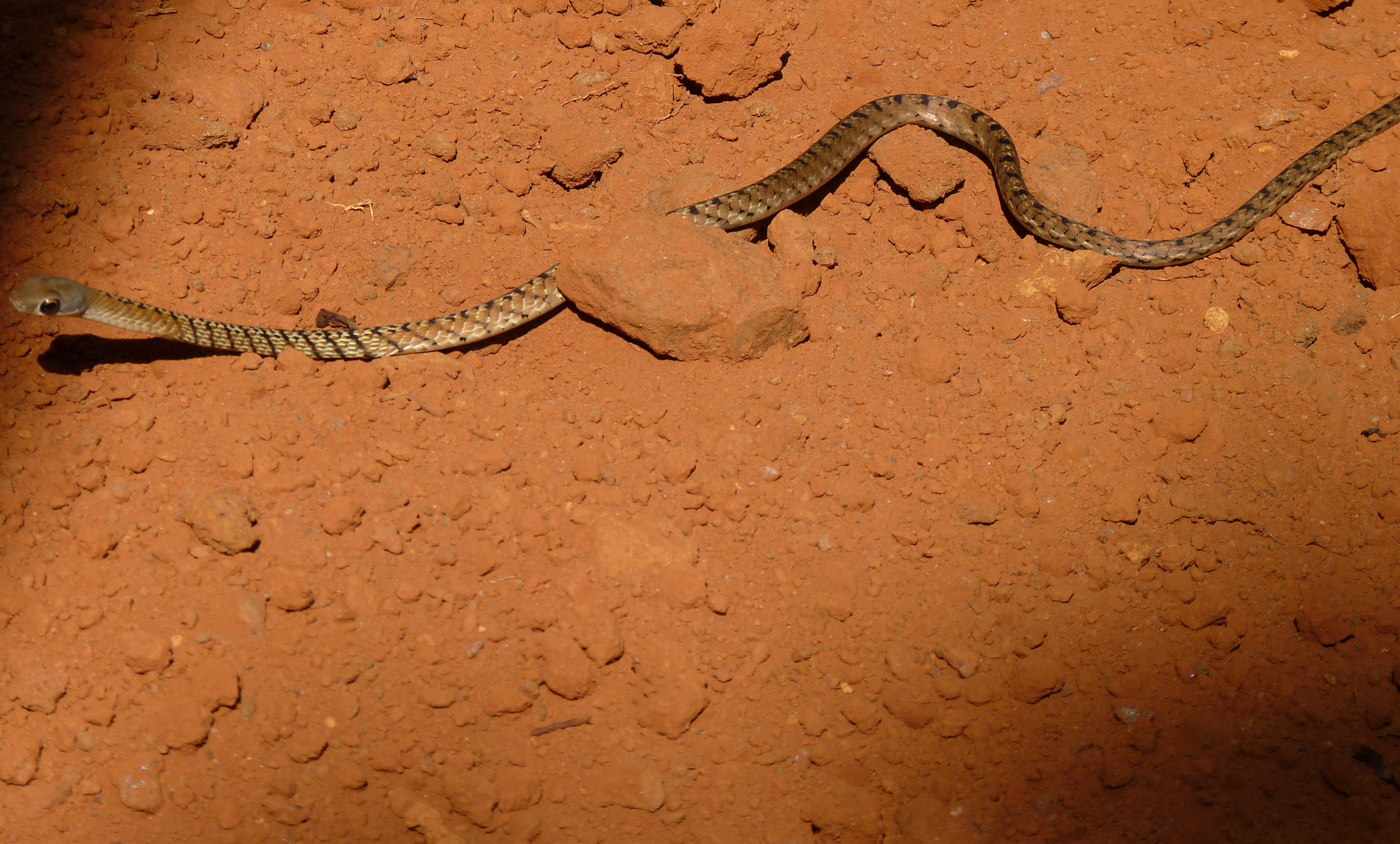

Conservation status
- Least Concern (IUCN 3.1)

Scientific classification
- Kingdom: Animalia
- Phylum: Chordata
- Order: Squamata
- Suborder: Serpentes
- Family: Colubridae
- Subfamily: Ahaetuliinae
- Genus: Dendrelaphis
- Species: D. grandoculis

Binomial name
- Dendrelaphis grandoculis (Boulenger, 1890)

Synonyms
- Dendrophis grandoculis

= Dendrelaphis grandoculis =

Species of reptile

Dendrelaphis grandoculis, commonly called the large-eyed bronzeback or southern bronzeback, is a species of Colubrid snake endemic to the Western Ghats of southwestern India.

== Description ==
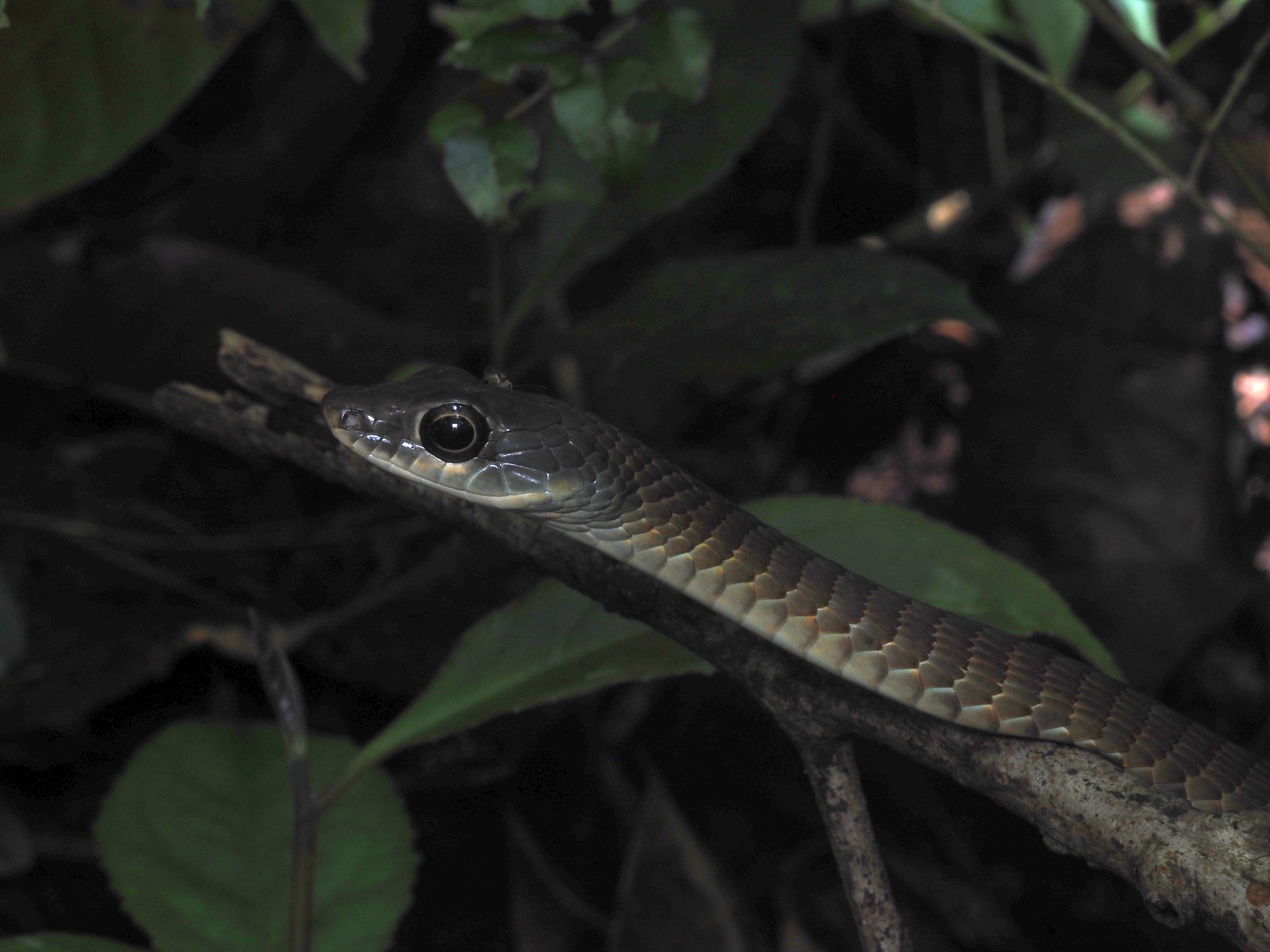

The eye is extremely large, as long as its distance from the rostral. Rostral much broader than long, visible from above, its upper border nearly straight; suture between the internasals as long as that between the prefrontals or a little longer; frontal as long as its distance from the end of the snout, as long as the parietals; loreal elongate; one pre- and two postoculars; temporals 2+2; upper labials 9, fourth, fifth, and sixth entering the eye; 5 lower labials in contact with the anterior chin-shields, which are shorter than the posterior. Scales in 15 rows, vertebral nearly as large as the outer row. Ventrals 174–170; anal divided; subcaudals 117. Olive-brown above, with irregular small black blotches; eye bordered with whitish; lower parts pale olive. Total length 4 feet; tail 13 1/2 inches. (after Boulenger)

== Etymology ==
Greek, grand meaning large and oculis of the eye; hence the common name large-eyed bronzeback.

== Distribution ==
This species is endemic to the Western Ghats and is known from Agasthyamalai, Travancore hills, Periyar Tiger Reserve, Anaimalai, Waynad, Coorg, and Malnad region of Karnataka, northwards till Castle Rock near Goa.

== Habits and habitat ==
Rather slow in speed for a bronzeback, it slithers across tree branches foraging for lizards, frogs, and small birds to eat. A diurnal and arboreal forest-dwelling snake, partial to rainforests. Rarely seen in plantations and monocultures.
