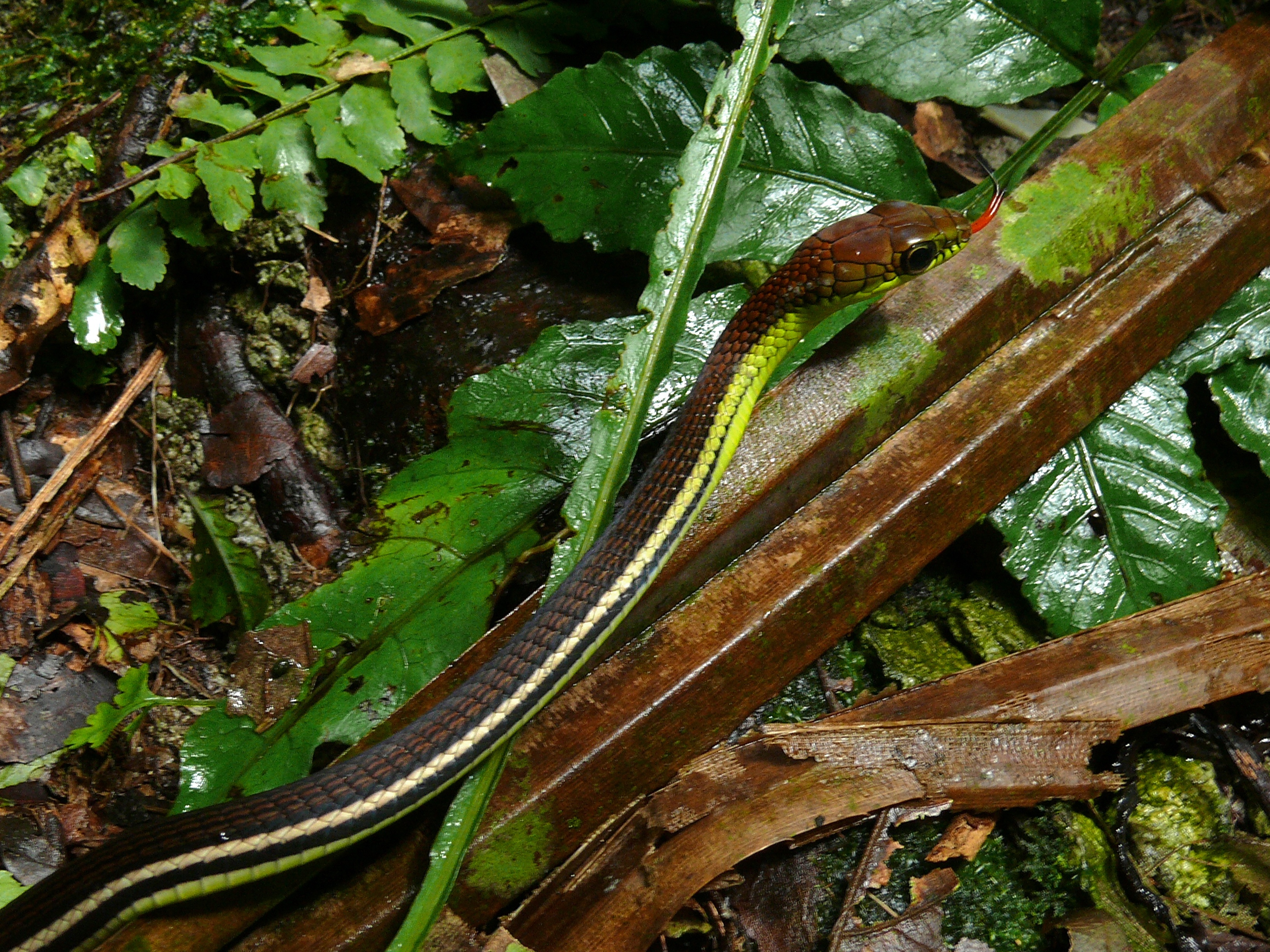

Conservation status
- Least Concern (IUCN 3.1)

Scientific classification
- Kingdom: Animalia
- Phylum: Chordata
- Order: Squamata
- Suborder: Serpentes
- Family: Colubridae
- Subfamily: Ahaetuliinae
- Genus: Dendrelaphis
- Species: D. formosus

Binomial name
- Dendrelaphis formosus (Boie, 1827)

Synonyms
- Dendrophis formosa Boie, 1827

= Dendrelaphis formosus =

Species of reptile

Dendrelaphis formosus, commonly known as either the elegant bronzeback or beautiful bronzeback tree snake, is a snake species in the family Colubridae from Southeast Asia.

== Taxonomy ==
Dendrelaphis formosus belongs to the genus Dendrelaphis, which contains 48 other described species.

Dendrelaphis is one of five genera belonging to the vine snake subfamily Ahaetuliinae, of which Dendrelaphis is most closely related to Chrysopelea, as shown in the cladogram below:

- Ahaetuliinae
  - sharp‑nosed snakes
    - - Ahaetulla
      - Proahaetulla
    - Dryophiops
  - broad‑nosed snakes
    - Dendrelaphis
      - - - - - Dendrelaphis marenae
              - Dendrelaphis haasi
            - Dendrelaphis pictus
          - - - Dendrelaphis ngansonensis
              - Dendrelaphis cyanochloris
            - Dendrelaphis striatus
        - Dendrelaphis formosus
      - - - - Dendrelaphis tristis
            - Dendrelaphis subocularis
          - Dendrelaphis schokari
        - - Dendrelaphis fuliginosus
          - Dendrelaphis caudolineatus
    - Chrysopelea

== Distribution and habitat ==
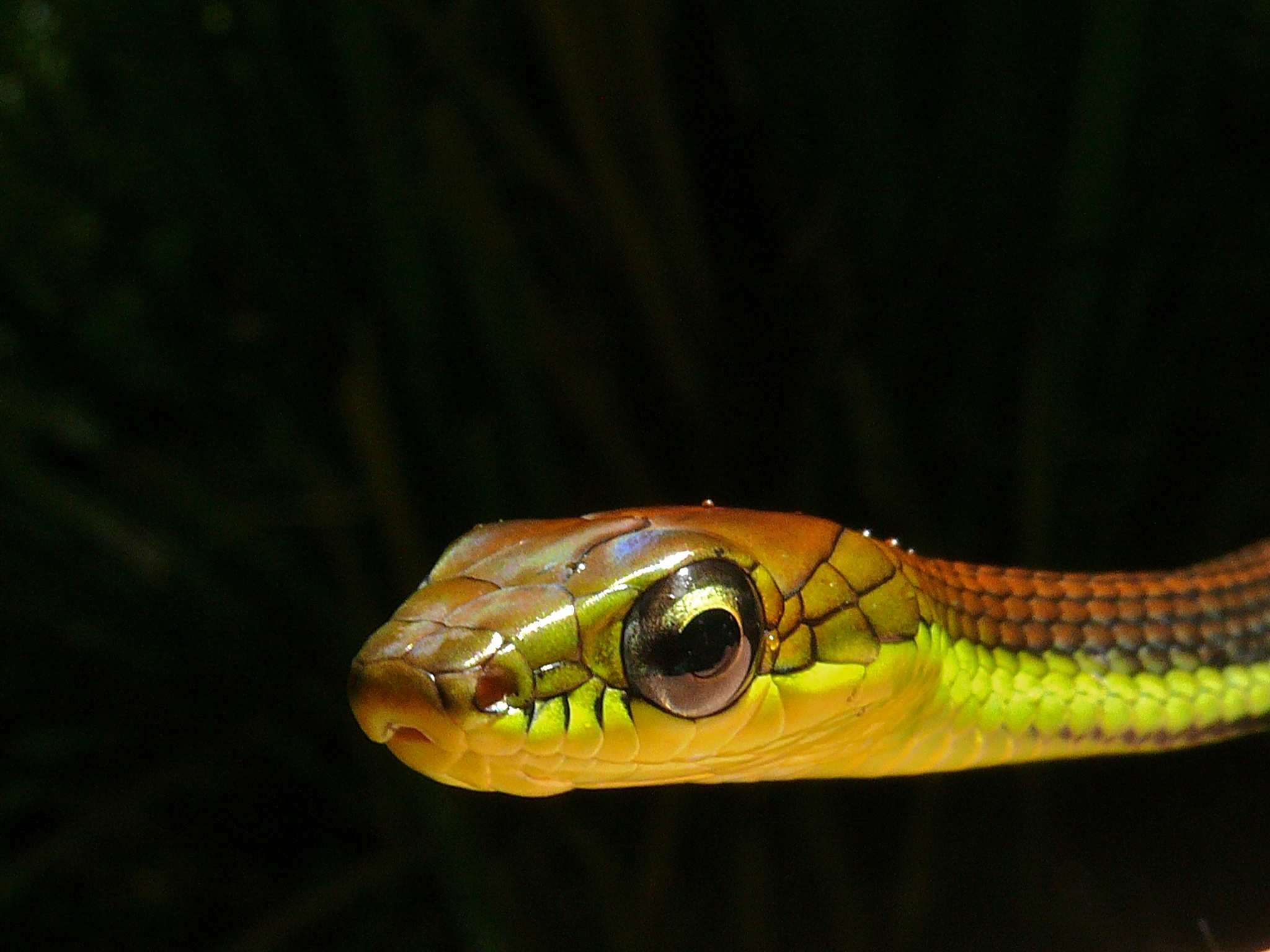
Beautiful bronzeback tree snake in Gunung Mulu National Park

The beautiful bronzeback tree snake is native to southern Thailand, Peninsular Malaysia to the islands of Sumatra, Borneo and Java. It inhabits lowland forests up to elevations of 600 m (2,000 ft).

== Behavior ==
The snake is diurnal and fully arboreal, and has oviparous reproduction. It mainly feeds on lizards, but occasionally also frogs.
