= Dendrelaphis binhi =

Binh's bronzeback snake

Scientific classification
- Kingdom: Animalia
- Phylum: Chordata
- Class: Reptilia
- Order: Squamata
- Suborder: Serpentes
- Family: Colubridae
- Subfamily: Ahaetuliinae
- Genus: Dendrelaphis
- Species: D. binhi

Binomial name
- Dendrelaphis binhi Nguyen, Nguyen, Le, Nguyen, Vo, Vo, Che & Murphy, 2023

Species of bronzeback snake

Dendrelaphis binhi, the Binh's bronzeback snake, is a species of bronzeback snake endemic to Southern Vietnam. The species was described in 2023 and is named after Vietnamese herpetologist Ngô Văn Bὶnh.

== Description ==
Dendrelaphis binhi possesses a whitish underside and bronze-brown colorings on its backside.
