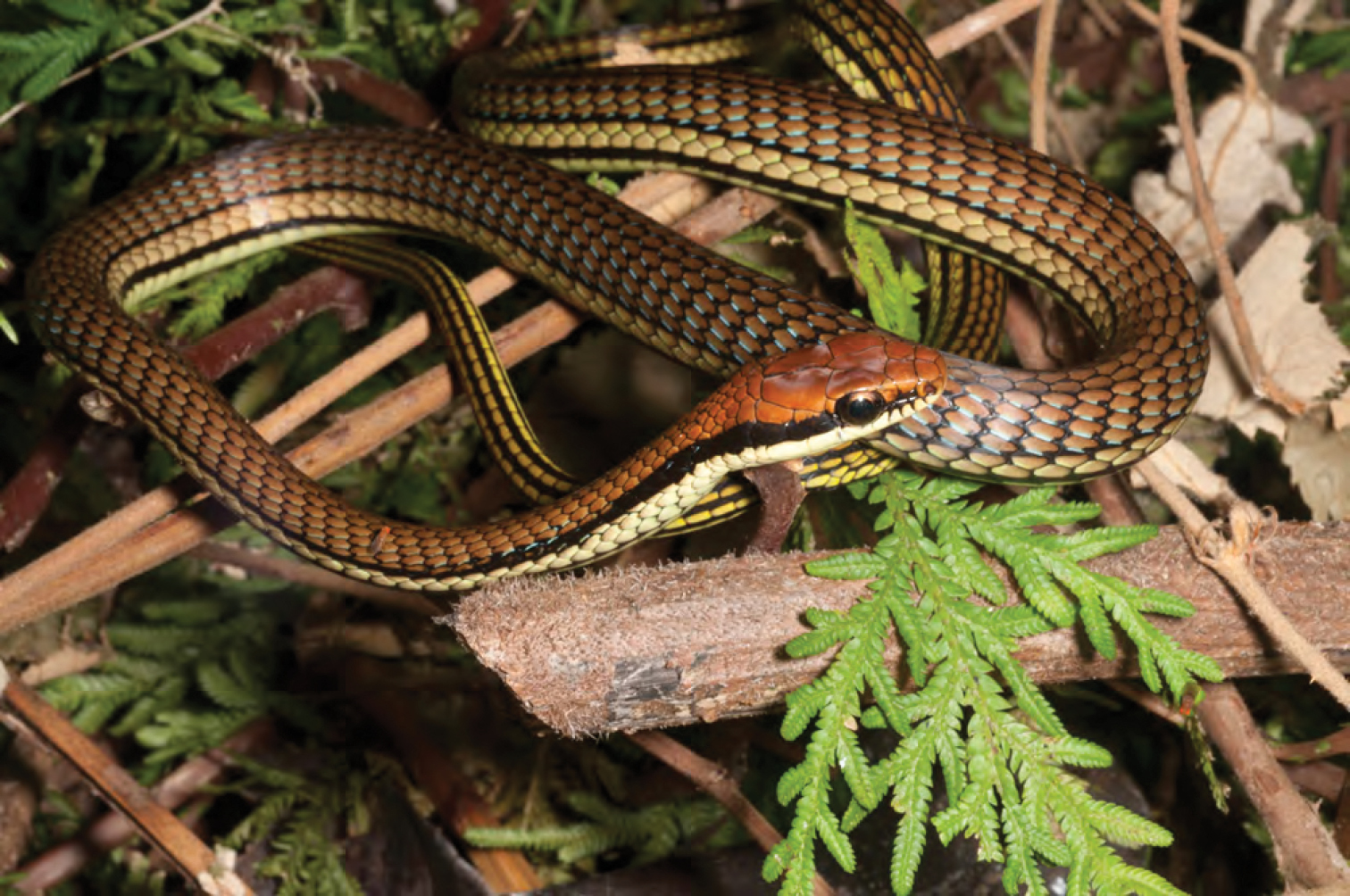

Conservation status
- Least Concern (IUCN 3.1)

Scientific classification
- Kingdom: Animalia
- Phylum: Chordata
- Class: Reptilia
- Order: Squamata
- Suborder: Serpentes
- Family: Colubridae
- Subfamily: Ahaetuliinae
- Genus: Dendrelaphis
- Species: D. luzonensis

Binomial name
- Dendrelaphis luzonensis Leviton, 1961

Synonyms
- Dendrelaphis caudolineatus luzonensis Leviton, 1961

= Dendrelaphis luzonensis =

Species of snake

Dendrelaphis luzonensis, also known as the Luzon bronzeback treesnake, is a species of snake of the family Colubridae.

== Geographic range ==
The snake is found on the island of Luzon in the Philippines.
