= Dendrelaphis macrops =

Scientific classification
- Kingdom: Animalia
- Phylum: Chordata
- Class: Reptilia
- Order: Squamata
- Suborder: Serpentes
- Family: Colubridae
- Subfamily: Ahaetuliinae
- Genus: Dendrelaphis
- Species: D. macrops

Binomial name
- Dendrelaphis macrops (Günther, 1877)

Species of snake

Dendrelaphis macrops is a species of snake of the family Colubridae.

== Geographic range ==
The snake is found in Papua New Guinea.
