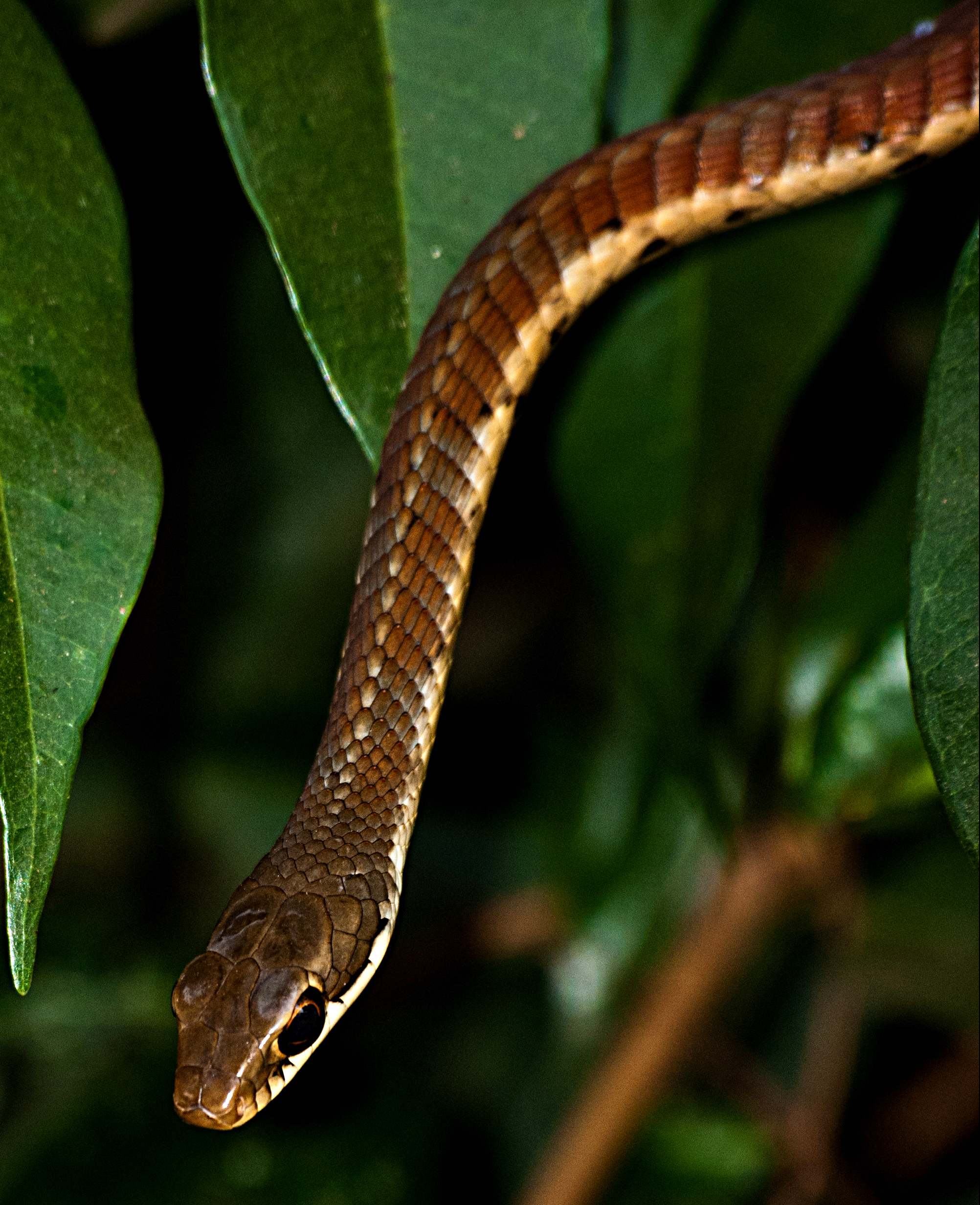

Conservation status
- Data Deficient (IUCN 3.1)

Scientific classification
- Kingdom: Animalia
- Phylum: Chordata
- Class: Reptilia
- Order: Squamata
- Suborder: Serpentes
- Family: Colubridae
- Subfamily: Ahaetuliinae
- Genus: Dendrelaphis
- Species: D. chairecacos

Binomial name
- Dendrelaphis chairecacos (Boie, 1827)

= Dendrelaphis chairecacos =

Species of snake

Dendrelaphis chairecacos is a species of snake in the family Colubridae. The species is found in India.
