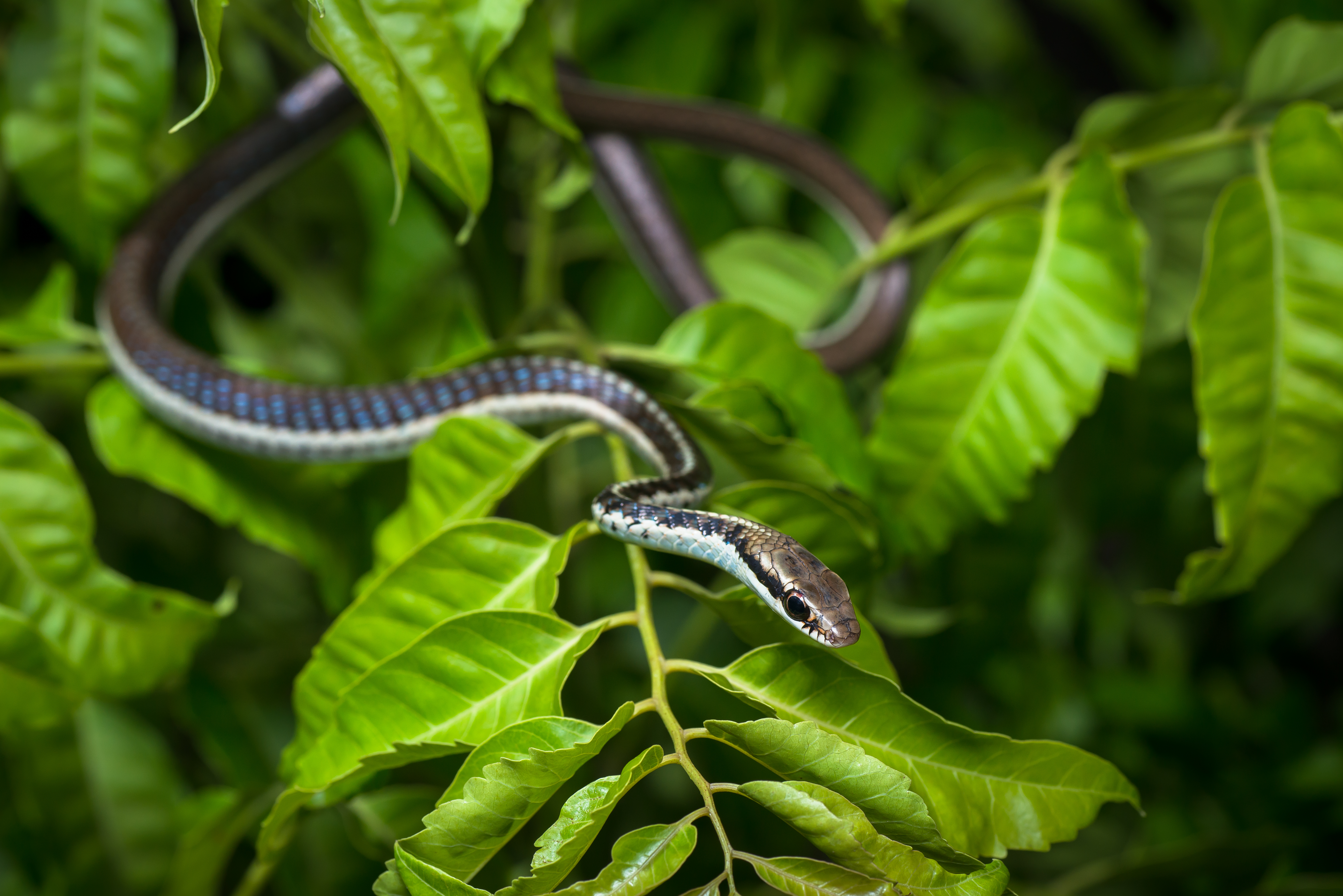

Conservation status
- Least Concern (IUCN 3.1)

Scientific classification
- Kingdom: Animalia
- Phylum: Chordata
- Order: Squamata
- Suborder: Serpentes
- Family: Colubridae
- Subfamily: Ahaetuliinae
- Genus: Dendrelaphis
- Species: D. subocularis

Binomial name
- Dendrelaphis subocularis (Boulenger, 1888)

= Dendrelaphis subocularis =

Species of snake

Dendrelaphis subocularis, commonly known as the mountain bronzeback or Burmese bronzeback, is a species of snake in the family Colubridae from Southeast Asia.

== Taxonomy ==
Dendrelaphis subocularis belongs to the genus Dendrelaphis, which contains 48 other described species.

Dendrelaphis is one of five genera belonging to the vine snake subfamily Ahaetuliinae, of which Dendrelaphis is most closely related to Chrysopelea, as shown in the cladogram below:

- Ahaetuliinae
  - sharp‑nosed snakes
    - - Ahaetulla
      - Proahaetulla
    - Dryophiops
  - broad‑nosed snakes
    - Dendrelaphis
      - - - - - Dendrelaphis marenae
              - Dendrelaphis haasi
            - Dendrelaphis pictus
          - - - Dendrelaphis ngansonensis
              - Dendrelaphis cyanochloris
            - Dendrelaphis striatus
        - Dendrelaphis formosus
      - - - - Dendrelaphis tristis
            - Dendrelaphis subocularis
          - Dendrelaphis schokari
        - - Dendrelaphis fuliginosus
          - Dendrelaphis caudolineatus
    - Chrysopelea

== Distribution ==
The species is found in Myanmar, Thailand, Cambodia, Vietnam, China (Yunnan), and Indonesia (Java).

== Behavior ==
The snake is diurnal and fully arboreal, and has oviparous reproduction.
