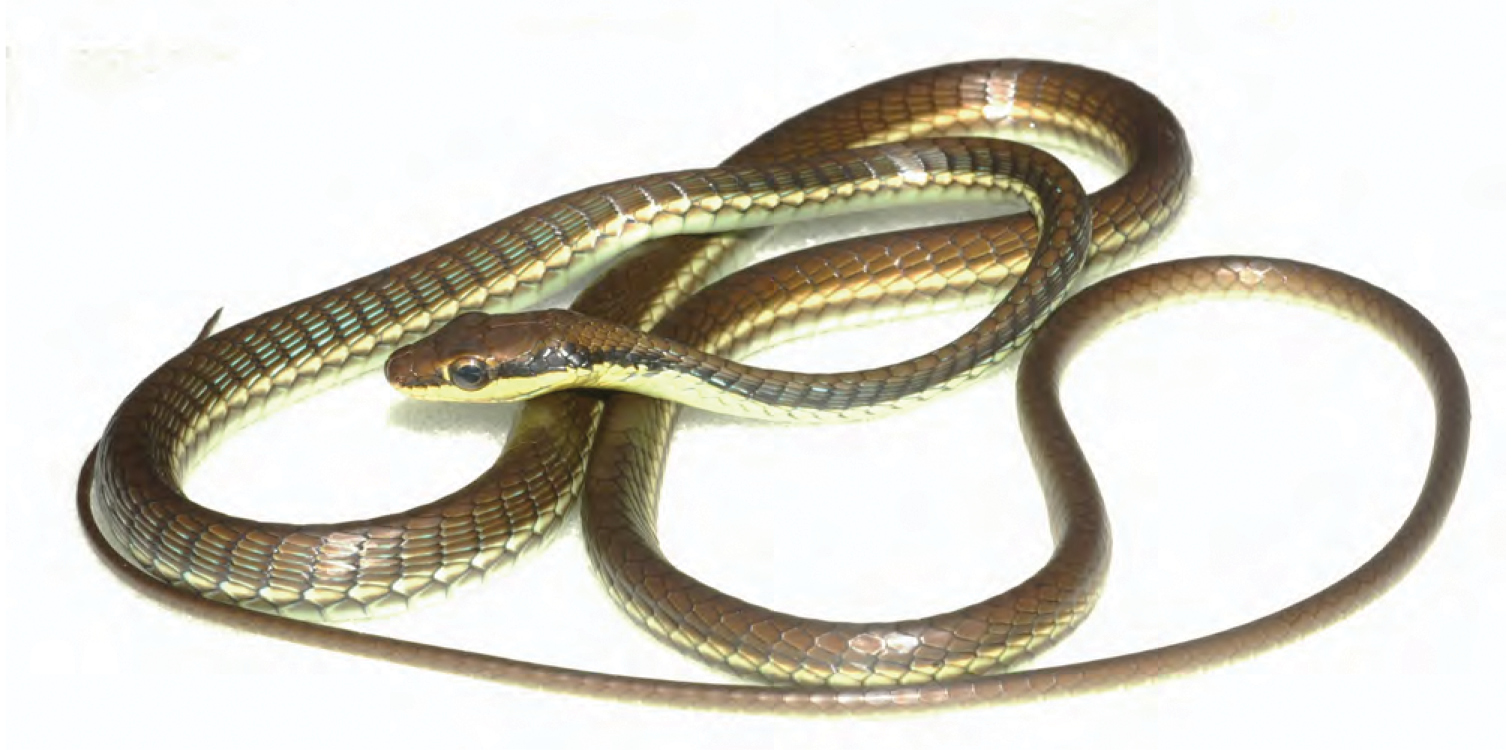

Conservation status
- Least Concern (IUCN 3.1)

Scientific classification
- Kingdom: Animalia
- Phylum: Chordata
- Class: Reptilia
- Order: Squamata
- Suborder: Serpentes
- Family: Colubridae
- Subfamily: Ahaetuliinae
- Genus: Dendrelaphis
- Species: D. marenae

Binomial name
- Dendrelaphis marenae G. Vogel & van Rooijen, 2008

= Dendrelaphis marenae =

Species of snake

Dendrelaphis marenae, also known commonly as Gaulke's bronze-back tree snake and Maren's bronzeback, is a species of snake in the subfamily Ahaetuliinae of the family Colubridae. The species is native to Southeast Asia.

== Etymology ==
The species Dendrelaphis marenae is named after German herpetologist Dr. Maren Gaulke, honoring her scientific contributions to the field of herpetology in the Philippines. She also helped collect some of the initial specimens.

== Taxonomy ==
Dendrelaphis marenae belongs to the genus Dendrelaphis, which contains 48 other described species.

Dendrelaphis is one of five genera belonging to the vine snake subfamily Ahaetuliinae, of which Dendrelaphis is most closely related to Chrysopelea, as shown in the cladogram below:

- Ahaetuliinae
  - sharp‑nosed snakes
    - - Ahaetulla
      - Proahaetulla
    - Dryophiops
  - broad‑nosed snakes
    - Dendrelaphis
      - - - - - Dendrelaphis marenae
              - Dendrelaphis haasi
            - Dendrelaphis pictus
          - - - Dendrelaphis ngansonensis
              - Dendrelaphis cyanochloris
            - Dendrelaphis striatus
        - Dendrelaphis formosus
      - - - - Dendrelaphis tristis
            - Dendrelaphis subocularis
          - Dendrelaphis schokari
        - - Dendrelaphis fuliginosus
          - Dendrelaphis caudolineatus
    - Chrysopelea

== Distribution ==
Dendrelaphis marenae is found in Indonesia and the Philippines.

== Habitat ==
The preferred natural habitat of Dendrelaphis marenae is forest, at elevations up to 1,000 m (3,300 ft).

== Behavior ==
Dendrelaphis marenae is diurnal and fully arboreal.

== Diet ==
Dendrelaphis marenae preys predominantly upon frogs.

== Reproduction ==
Dendrelaphis marenae is oviparous. Clutch size is two to ten eggs.
