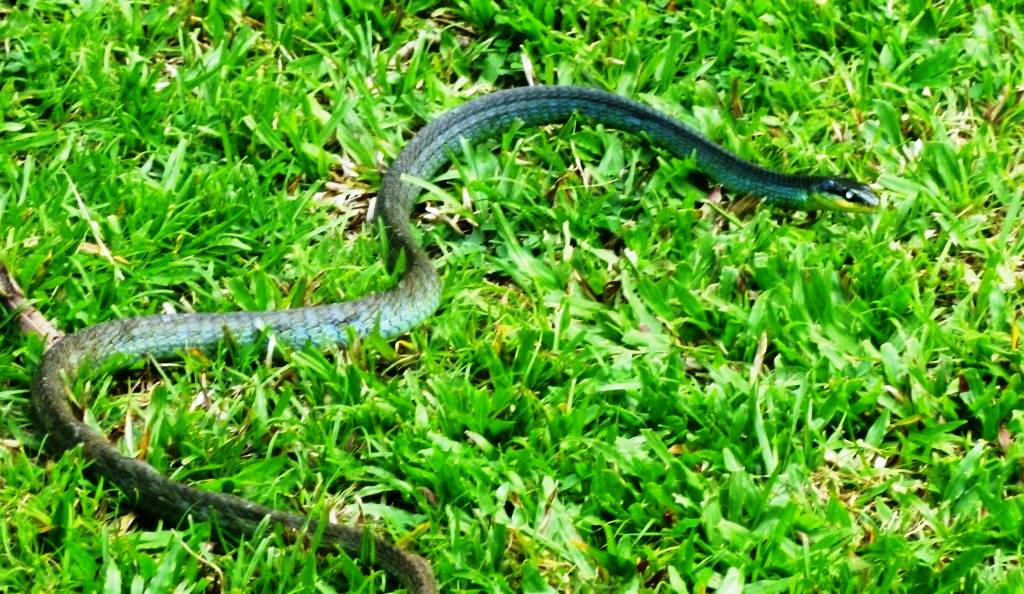
- Northern Tree Snake

Conservation status
- Data Deficient (IUCN 3.1)

Scientific classification
- Kingdom: Animalia
- Phylum: Chordata
- Class: Reptilia
- Order: Squamata
- Suborder: Serpentes
- Family: Colubridae
- Subfamily: Ahaetuliinae
- Genus: Dendrelaphis
- Species: D. papuensis

Binomial name
- Dendrelaphis papuensis Boulenger, 1895

= Dendrelaphis papuensis =

Species of snake

Dendrelaphis papuensis, the Papuan treesnake, is a species of snake in the family Colubridae. The species is found in the Trobriand Islands of Papua New Guinea.
