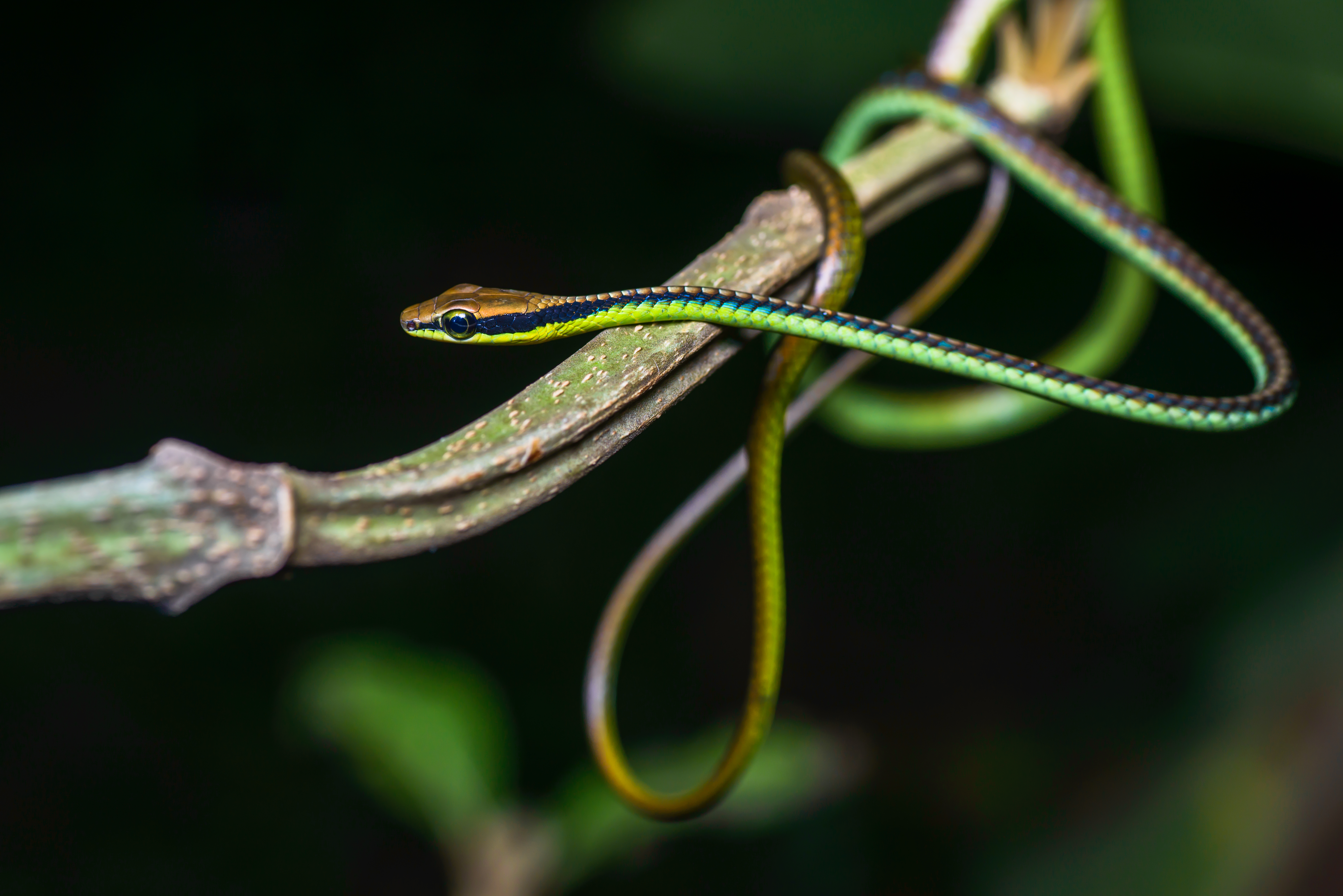

Conservation status
- Least Concern (IUCN 3.1)

Scientific classification
- Kingdom: Animalia
- Phylum: Chordata
- Order: Squamata
- Suborder: Serpentes
- Family: Colubridae
- Subfamily: Ahaetuliinae
- Genus: Dendrelaphis
- Species: D. cyanochloris

Binomial name
- Dendrelaphis cyanochloris (Wall, 1921)

Synonyms
- Dendrophis pictus Wall, 1921; Ahaetulla cyanochloris Wall, 1921; Dendrophis boiga subspecies cyanochloris Wall, 1921; Dendrophis pictus subspecies cyanochlorisWall, 1921

= Dendrelaphis cyanochloris =

Wall's bronzeback

Species of snake

Dendrelaphis cyanochloris, commonly known as Wall's bronzeback or the blue bronzeback, is a species of colubrid snake found in Southeast Asia.

== Taxonomy ==
Dendrelaphis cyanochloris belongs to the genus Dendrelaphis, which contains 48 other described species. D. cyanochloris is most closely related to Dendrelaphis ngansonensis, and together the two might form a species complex.

Dendrelaphis is one of five genera belonging to the vine snake subfamily Ahaetuliinae, of which Dendrelaphis is most closely related to Chrysopelea, as shown in the cladogram below:

- Ahaetuliinae
  - sharp‑nosed snakes
    - - Ahaetulla
      - Proahaetulla
    - Dryophiops
  - broad‑nosed snakes
    - Dendrelaphis
      - - - - - Dendrelaphis marenae
              - Dendrelaphis haasi
            - Dendrelaphis pictus
          - - - Dendrelaphis ngansonensis
              - Dendrelaphis cyanochloris
            - Dendrelaphis striatus
        - Dendrelaphis formosus
      - - - - Dendrelaphis tristis
            - Dendrelaphis subocularis
          - Dendrelaphis schokari
        - - Dendrelaphis fuliginosus
          - Dendrelaphis caudolineatus
    - Chrysopelea

== Distribution ==
The species occurs in India (Assam, Arunachal Pradesh (Namdapha - Changlang district); Andaman Islands, northern parts of West Bengal), Bangladesh, Myanmar, southern Thailand, and western Malaysia (Pulau Pinang, Pahang, Pulau Tioman), possibly also in Bhutan. It is predominantly arboreal and inhabits primary and mature secondary lowland rainforest, at altitudes of up to 1,000 m.

== Behavior ==
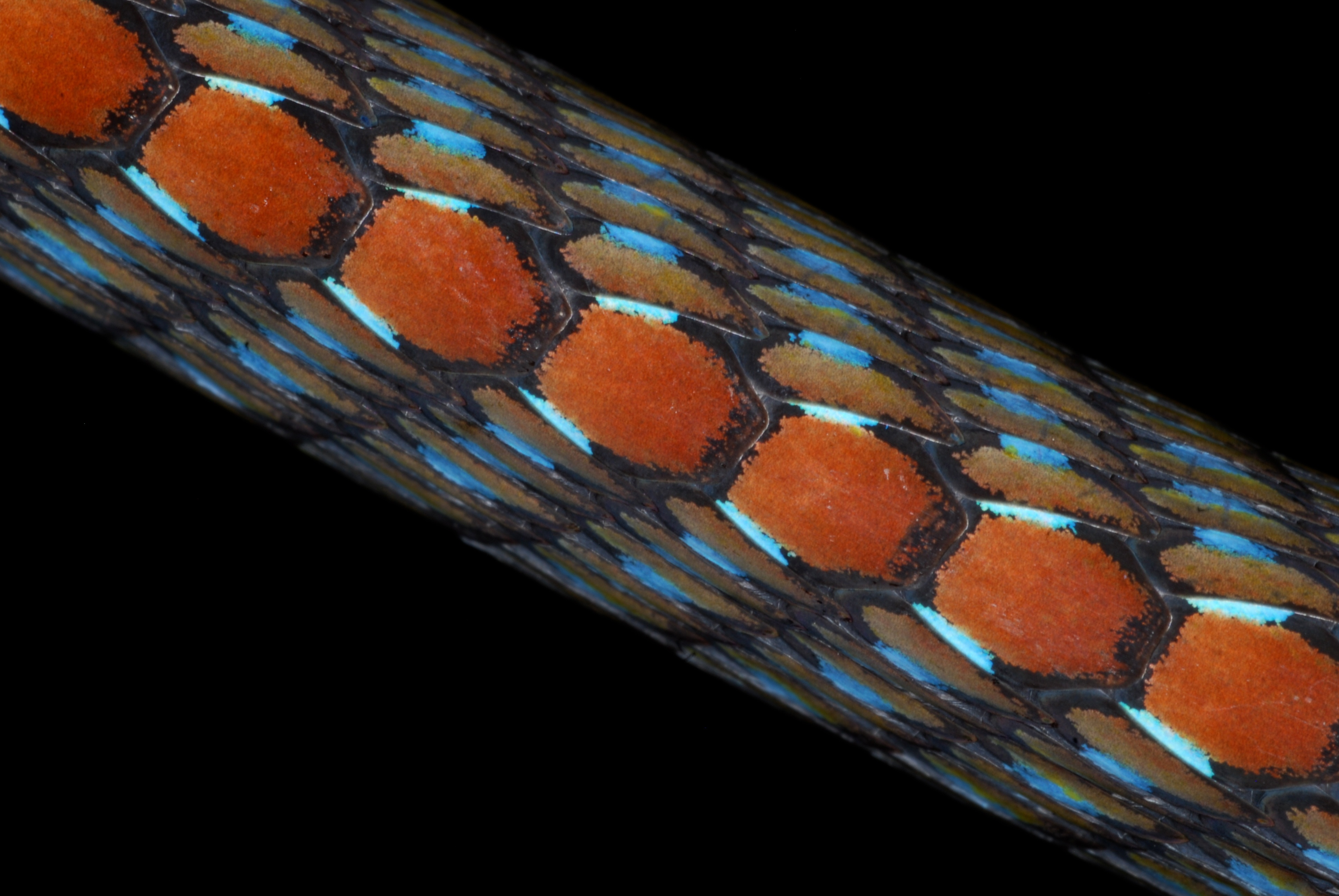
closeup of dorsal scales

Like other bronzebacks, this snake is diurnal and fully arboreal, and has oviparous reproduction.

== Conservation ==
Common and widespread, Wall's bronzeback is currently classified as Least Concern by the IUCN, although it is likely impacted by localized habitat loss and degradation from agricultural expansion and logging.
