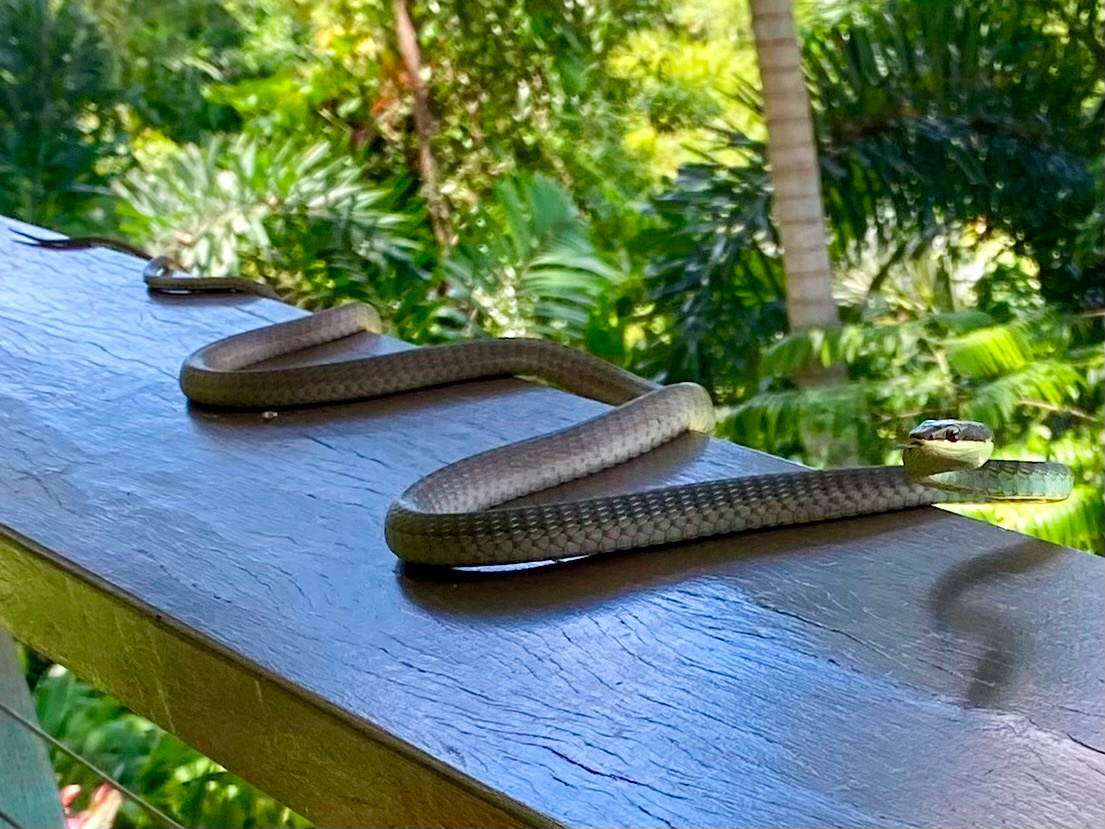

Conservation status
- Least Concern (IUCN 3.1)

Scientific classification
- Kingdom: Animalia
- Phylum: Chordata
- Class: Reptilia
- Order: Squamata
- Suborder: Serpentes
- Family: Colubridae
- Subfamily: Ahaetuliinae
- Genus: Dendrelaphis
- Species: D. calligaster

Binomial name
- Dendrelaphis calligaster (Günther, 1867)

Synonyms
- Dendrophis calligastra Günther, 1867; Dendrophis salomonis Günther, 1872; Dendrophis aruensis Doria, 1874; Dendrophis katowensis Macleay, 1877; Dendrophis darnleyensis Macleay, 1877; Dendrelaphis papuensis Boulenger, 1895; Dendrelaphis schlenckeri Ogilby, 1898; Dendrophis calligastra keiensis Mertens, 1926; Dendrophis calligastra distinguendus Meise & Hennig, 1932

= Dendrelaphis calligaster =

Species of snake

Dendrelaphis calligaster, also called green tree snake, northern green tree-snake, and northern tree snake, is a colubrid snake native to New Guinea, Australia, and Solomon Islands. It is a slender, large-eyed, non-venomous, diurnal snake, which grows up to 1.2 m in length and is greenish, brown, or greyish above with a cream or yellow belly.

This common snake is harmless, and readily recognised due to its cream to yellow belly and pronounced wide dark facial stripe passing across the eye.

== Etymology ==
The specific name calligaster means "beautiful-bellied".

== Distribution and habitat ==
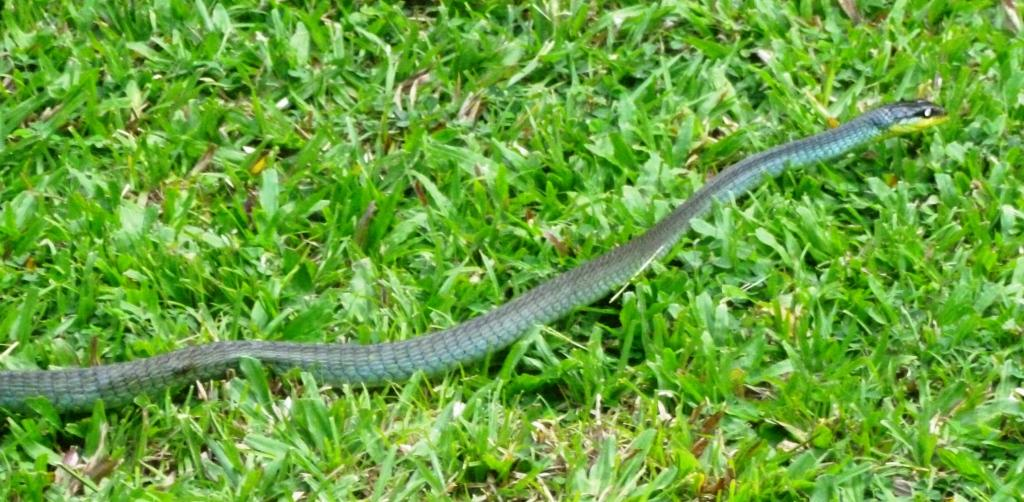
Photo showing distinctive black stripe through eye

In Australia, Dendrelaphis calligaster are found on the eastern side of the Cape York Peninsula (Queensland) as far south as Mackay. On the western side, their range is poorly mapped. They also occur on many of the Torres Strait Islands. On the New Guinea mainland, they are widespread at elevations below 1,150 m (3,770 ft) in both Indonesian and Papua New Guinean parts of the island. They occur also on many nearby islands. The Reptile Database also lists this species from the Solomons.

Dendrelaphis calligaster is primarily arboreal but can also forage on the ground. It can be found in rainforest, mangroves, dense secondary regrowth, and tropical woodlands. It is abundant throughout its range.

== Behaviour and ecology ==
They eat frogs and reptiles.

== Breeding ==
The northern tree snake lays five to seven eggs in clutches, with one female recorded as laying 11 eggs in January.
