= Dendrelaphis effrenis =

Scientific classification
- Kingdom: Animalia
- Phylum: Chordata
- Class: Reptilia
- Order: Squamata
- Suborder: Serpentes
- Family: Colubridae
- Subfamily: Ahaetuliinae
- Genus: Dendrelaphis
- Species: D. effrenis

Binomial name
- Dendrelaphis effrenis (Werner, 1909)

Synonyms
- Dendrophis effrenis Werner, 1909; Dendrelaphis sinharajensis Wickramasinghe, 2016

Species of snake

Dendrelaphis effrenis is a species of arboreal snake endemic to Sri Lanka. It was considered synonym of D. caudolineolatus until revalidation in 2020. At the same time, D. sinharajensis was brought into synonymy of D. effrenis. Proposed vernacular names for D. sinharajensis include Sinharaja tree snake, Sinharaja haldanda (Sinhala; සිංහරාජ හාල්දණ්ඩා), and Sinharaja komberi muken (Tamil).

== Description ==
Prominent black and white cross bars are present throughout the body. Black bars are paired and make the margins for the white bars. Parietal strip is present. Dorsal color bright red on nape and becomes fade to tail. There are 13 midbody scale rows, 174–175 ventral scales, and 129–139 subcaudal scales. Loreal scale is absent. The largest specimen measures 67 cm (26.4 in) in snout–vent length.

== Distribution ==
Dendrelaphis effrenis was described based on a single specimen from Colombo, perhaps from rainforest patches near the city. At the time of description, the former D. sinharajensis was restricted to higher canopies of Sinharaja rain forest and its vicinity lowland wet zone. D. effrenis has now also been recorded in the Sabaragamuwa Province. It is known from elevations between 50–350 m (160–1,150 ft) above sea level and might once have been widely distributed in lowland rainforests of Sri Lanka.

== Ecology ==
It is diurnal and predominantly arboreal, and hard to encounter as a canopy-dwelling snake.
