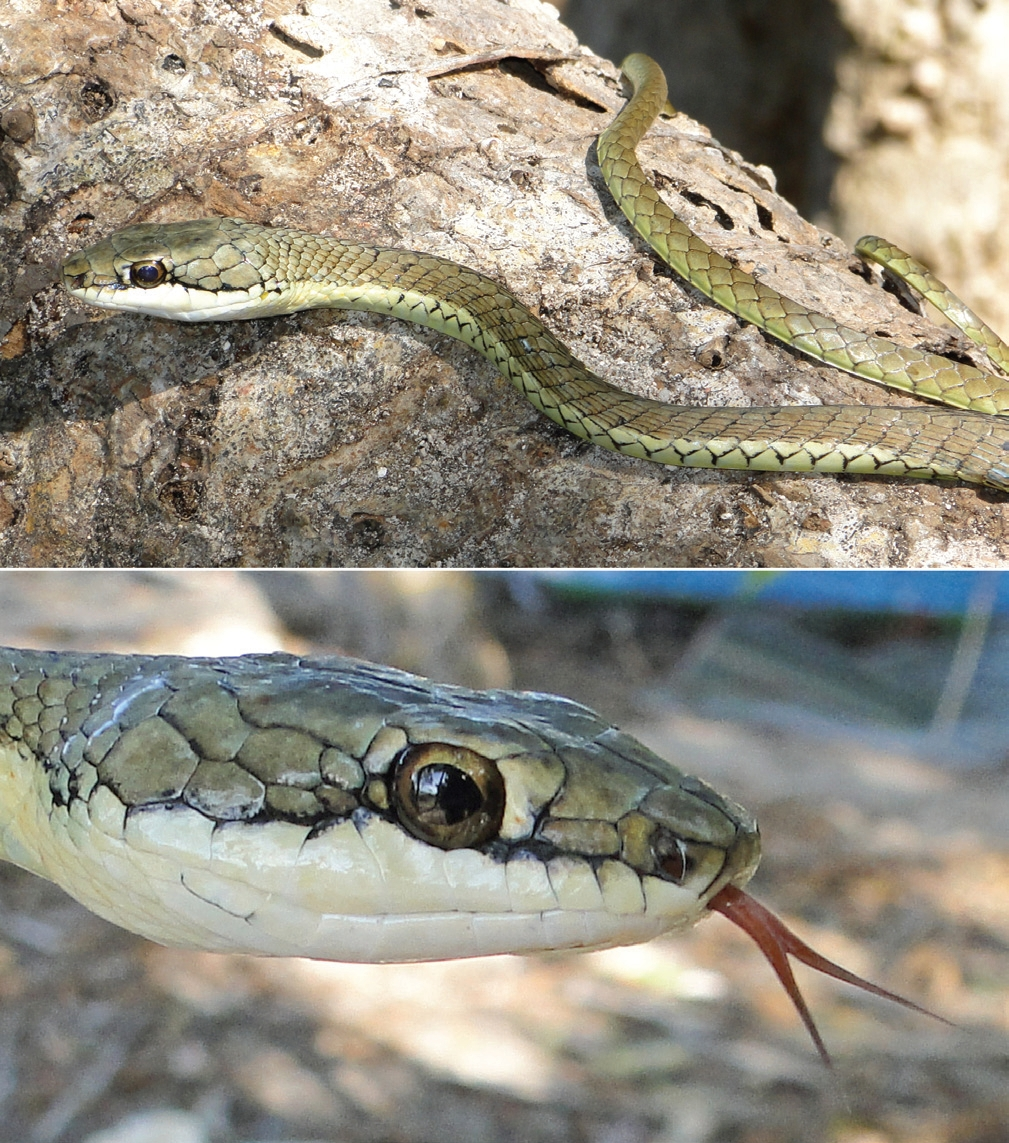

Conservation status
- Least Concern (IUCN 3.1)

Scientific classification
- Kingdom: Animalia
- Phylum: Chordata
- Class: Reptilia
- Order: Squamata
- Suborder: Serpentes
- Family: Colubridae
- Subfamily: Ahaetuliinae
- Genus: Dendrelaphis
- Species: D. inornatus

Binomial name
- Dendrelaphis inornatus (Boulenger, 1897

= Dendrelaphis inornatus =

Species of snake

Dendrelaphis inornatus, the Lesser Sundas bronzeback, is a species of snake in the family Colubridae. The species is found in Timor-Leste and Indonesia.
