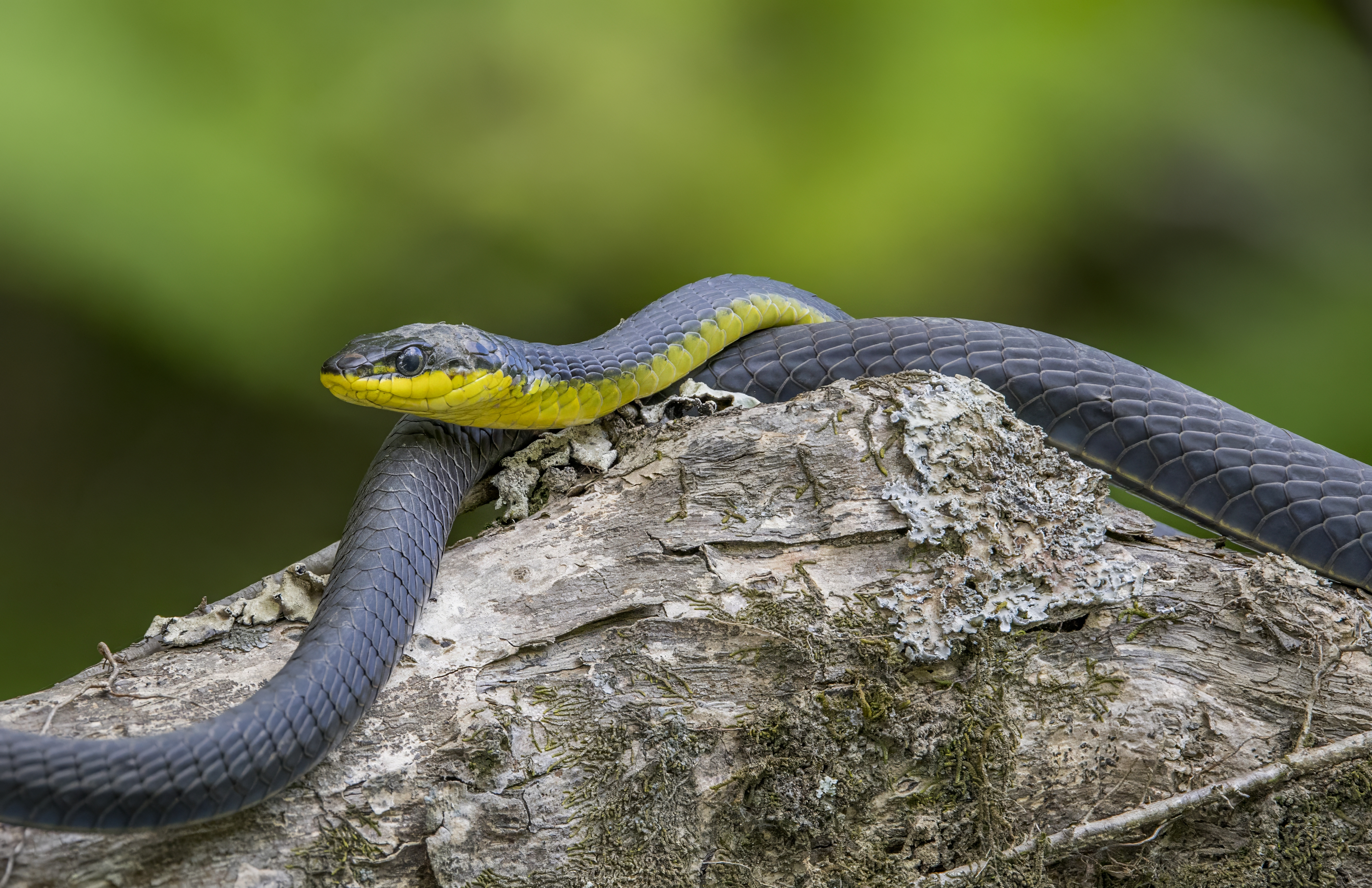
- D. punctulatus

Scientific classification
- Kingdom: Animalia
- Phylum: Chordata
- Class: Reptilia
- Order: Squamata
- Suborder: Serpentes
- Family: Colubridae
- Subfamily: Ahaetuliinae
- Genus: Dendrelaphis; Boulenger, 1890

Species
- >40 recognized species, see article.

Synonyms
- Dendrophis

= Dendrelaphis =

Genus of snakes

Dendrelaphis is a genus of snakes in the subfamily Ahaetuliinae of the family Colubridae. Species of the genus Dendrelaphis are distributed from Pakistan, India and southern China to Indonesia, Timor-Leste, the Philippines, Australia, New Guinea and the Solomon Islands. There are over 50 described species. Asian species are known commonly as bronzebacks, while the Australo-Papuan species are simply called tree snakes. All are non-venomous and entirely harmless to humans.

== Taxonomy ==
Dendrelaphis is one of five genera belonging to the vine snake subfamily Ahaetuliinae, of which Dendrelaphis is most closely related to Chrysopelea, as shown in the cladogram below:

- Ahaetuliinae
  - sharp‑nosed snakes
    - - Ahaetulla
      - Proahaetulla
    - Dryophiops
  - broad‑nosed snakes
    - Dendrelaphis
      - - - - - Dendrelaphis marenae
              - Dendrelaphis haasi
            - Dendrelaphis pictus
          - - - Dendrelaphis ngansonensis
              - Dendrelaphis cyanochloris
            - Dendrelaphis striatus
        - Dendrelaphis formosus
      - - - - Dendrelaphis tristis
            - Dendrelaphis subocularis
          - Dendrelaphis schokari
        - - Dendrelaphis fuliginosus
          - Dendrelaphis caudolineatus
    - Chrysopelea

=== Species ===
This list is based on the latest checklist of snakes in the world and recent revisions and descriptions published in the scientific literature.

The authors of a 2015 revision of the Australo-Papuan Dendrelaphis species recommended the synonymizing of D. solomonis within D. calligaster, the elevation of D. keiensis to species status, the resurrection of D. lineolatus from within D. calligaster, and the resurrection of D. macrops and elevation of D. striolatus from within D. punctulatus. They also confined D. punctulatus to Australia and D. papuensis to the Trobriand Islands of Papua New Guinea.

- Dendrelaphis andamanensis (Anderson, 1871) – Andaman bronzeback
- Dendrelaphis anthracina Kraus, 2025
- Dendrelaphis ashoki G. Vogel & van Rooijen, 2011 – Ashok's bronzeback tree snake
- Dendrelaphis atra Kraus, 2025
- Dendrelaphis bifrenalis (Boulenger, 1890) – Boulenger's bronzeback – southern India and Sri Lanka
- Dendrelaphis biloreatus (Wall, 1908) – Gore's bronzeback
- Dendrelaphis binhi (S. Nguyen, V. Nguyen, Le, L. Nguyen, T. Vo, B. Vo, Che & Murphy, 2023) – Binh's bronzeback
- Dendrelaphis calligaster (Günther, 1867) – northern treesnake, green treesnake, coconut treesnake
- Dendrelaphis caudolineatus (Gray, 1834) – striped bronzeback, grey bronzeback
- Dendrelaphis caudolineolatus (Günther, 1869) – Gunther's bronzeback tree snake
- Dendrelaphis chairecacos (F. Boie, 1827)
- Dendrelaphis cyanochloris (Wall, 1921) – blue bronzeback
- Dendrelaphis effrenis (F. Werner, 1909) – Sinharaja tree snake
- Dendrelaphis flavescens Gaulke, 1994 – Sulu bronzeback
- Dendrelaphis formosus (F. Boie, 1827) – elegant bronzeback
- Dendrelaphis fuliginosus (Griffin, 1909) – Philippine lamp-black tree snake
- Dendrelaphis gastrostictus (Boulenger, 1894) – montane treesnake
- Dendrelaphis girii G. Vogel & van Rooijen, 2011 – Giri's bronzeback
- Dendrelaphis grandoculis (Boulenger, 1890) – large-eyed bronzeback, southern bronzeback
- Dendrelaphis grismeri G. Vogel & van Rooijen, 2008
- Dendrelaphis haasi van Rooijen & G. Vogel, 2008 – Haas's bronzeback
- Dendrelaphis hollinrakei Lazell, 2002
- Dendrelaphis humayuni Tiwari & Biswas, 1973 – Nicobar bronzeback, Tiwari's bronzeback
- Dendrelaphis inornatus (Boulenger, 1897) – Lesser Sunda bronzeback
- Dendrelaphis keiensis (Mertens, 1926) – Kei treesnake
- Dendrelaphis kopsteini G. Vogel & van Rooijen, 2007 – Kopstein's bronzeback
- Dendrelaphis levitoni van Rooijen & G. Vogel, 2012 – Leviton's bronzeback tree snake
- Dendrelaphis lineolatus (Jacquinot & Guichenot, 1853)
- Dendrelaphis lorentzii (van Lidth de Jeude, 1911) – Lorentz River treesnake
- Dendrelaphis luzonensis Leviton, 1961 – Luzon bronzeback treesnake
- Dendrelaphis macrops (Günther, 1877)
- Dendrelaphis marenae G. Vogel & van Rooijen, 2008 – Maren's bronzeback
- Dendrelaphis melanarkys Kraus, 2025
- Dendrelaphis modestus (Boulenger, 1894) – grey bronzeback, striped bronzeback
- Dendrelaphis ngansonensis (Bourret, 1935) – Nganson bronzeback
- Dendrelaphis nigroserratus G. Vogel, van Rooijen & Hauser, 2012 – sawtooth-necked bronzeback
- Dendrelaphis oliveri (Taylor, 1950) – Oliver's bronzeback
- Dendrelaphis papuensis (Boulenger, 1895) – Papuan treesnake
- Dendrelaphis philippinensis (Günther, 1879) – Philippine bronzeback treesnake
- Dendrelaphis pictus (Gmelin, 1789) – painted bronzeback, common bronzeback, Indonesian bronzeback
- Dendrelaphis proarchos (Wall, 1909)
- Dendrelaphis punctulatus (Gray, 1827) – common treesnake, Australian treesnake, green tree snake
- Dendrelaphis schokari (Kuhl, 1820) – Schokar's bronzeback
- Dendrelaphis striatus (Cohn, 1905) – striped bronzeback, striated bronzeback treesnake
- Dendrelaphis striolatus (W. Peters, 1867)
- Dendrelaphis subocularis (Boulenger, 1888) – mountain bronzeback, Burmese bronzeback
- Dendrelaphis terrificus (W. Peters, 1872) – terrific bronzeback
- Dendrelaphis thasuni (Atthanagoda et al., 2025)
- Dendrelaphis tristis (Daudin, 1803) – common bronzeback, Daudin's bronzeback
- Dendrelaphis underwoodi van Rooijen & G. Vogel, 2008 – Underwood's bronzeback
- Dendrelaphis vogeli Jiang, Guo, Ren & Li, 2020 – Vogel's bronzeback
- Dendrelaphis walli G. Vogel & van Rooijen, 2011
- Dendrelaphis wickrorum Danushka et al., 2020 – Wickramasinghes' bronzeback

== Description ==
Bronzebacks range in total length (including tail) from 2 feet (0.61 m) to up to 6 feet (1.8 m). All species have a slender body with a long tail. Males are shorter in length and brighter in coloration; they also tend to be more active. Females are stouter with duller or darker colorations and are less active. Typical coloration includes red, brown, or orange on the head with bronze, brown, or olive-green running down the length of the back. The underside of the body is usually bright to pale green or yellow. They have big eyes and bright red tongues. The tail is fully prehensile.

== Diet ==
The primary prey of Dendrelaphis species consists of lizards and frogs, but the larger species are capable of taking birds, bats, and small rodents.
