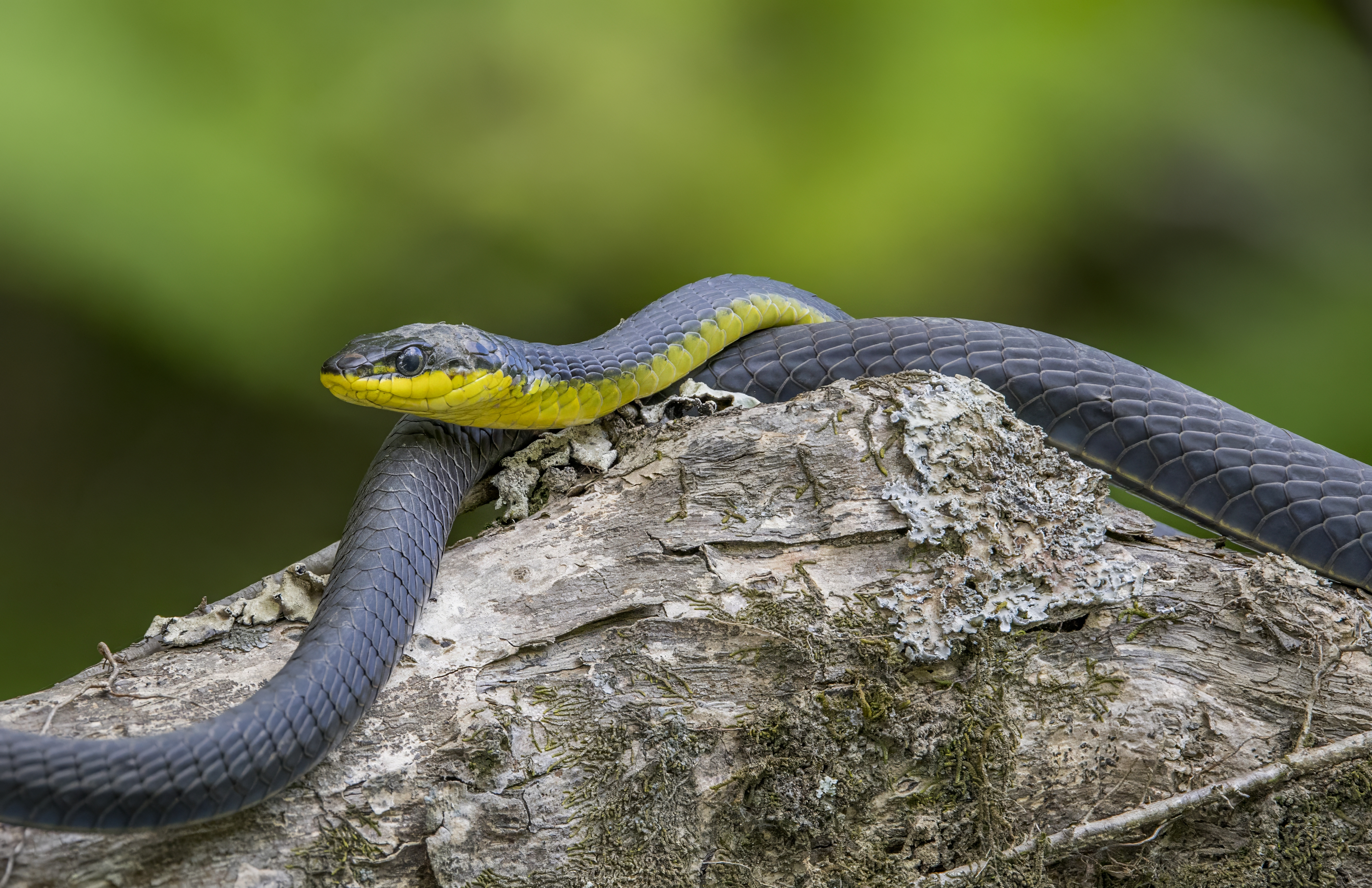
- Daintree River, Queensland, Australia

Conservation status
- Least Concern (IUCN 3.1)

Scientific classification
- Kingdom: Animalia
- Phylum: Chordata
- Class: Reptilia
- Order: Squamata
- Suborder: Serpentes
- Family: Colubridae
- Subfamily: Ahaetuliinae
- Genus: Dendrelaphis
- Species: D. punctulatus

Binomial name
- Dendrelaphis punctulatus (Gray, 1827)

Synonyms
- Leptophis punctulatus Gray, 1827; Ahaetulla punctulatus Gray, 1827; Elaps lewisii Gray, 1841; Dendrophis (Ahetula) olivacea Gray, 1842; Dendrophis prasinus Girard, 1858; Dendrophis gracilis Macleay, 1875; Dendrophis breviceps Macleay, 1877; Dendrophis olivacea Macleay, 1878 (non Dendrophis olivacea Gray, 1842); Dendrelaphis bilorealis Macleay, 1884; Dendrophis punctulatus — Fischer, 1884; Dendrelaphis punctulata — Cogger, 1983; Dendrelaphis punctulatus — Mattison, 1995

= Dendrelaphis punctulatus =

Species of snake

Dendrelaphis punctulatus, also known commonly as the Australian tree snake, the common tree snake, and the green tree snake, is a species of slender, large-eyed, diurnal, non-venomous snake in the family Colubridae. The species is native to many parts of Australia, especially in the northern and eastern coastal areas, and to Papua New Guinea.

It is an agile snake with a very slender body and tail and is also a strong swimmer, using the water for hunting and avoiding predation. The ventral body colour varies from golden yellow, to bright green, to olive-green, to black, sometimes even blue, while its back is typically dark in colour. It is frequently pale yellow on the throat and belly, but other pale colours have been noted. Blue flecks are present on the flanks. The eyes are large, with typically golden-coloured irises and large round pupils.

It is found in a variety of habitats ranging from rainforest to woodland to urban areas where it preys on fish, frogs, and other small animals.

It is a non-venomous species and does not constrict its prey, but rather relies on its sharp, angled teeth to 'chew' its prey down the oesophagus.

== Description ==
A study of D. punctulatus in Queensland showed females having an average snout–vent length of 1.01 metres (40 in) with males slightly shorter at 0.93 metres (37 in). Studies show that the snake may attain a total length in females of 2 metres (79 in) in females, while other sources state an overall maximum of 1.64 metres (65 in), which includes a tail 0.44 m (17 in) long. It has 24–26 maxillary teeth. The dorsal scales are arranged in 13 rows at midbody. The ventrals number 191–220. The anal plate is divided. The subcaudals, which are also divided, number 120–144.

== Distribution and habitat ==
D. punctulatus is common in Australia's northern tropics and eastern Australia. It is also found from the Kimberley region (Western Australia) to Cape York and Torres Strait (Queensland), extending down the east coast into New South Wales, and north into Papua New Guinea.

The common tree snake lives in a wide variety of habitats, including: bushland; well vegetated banks of rivers, creeks and streams; rainforest edges; eucalypt forests; heathland and areas with trees, long grass, and lush vegetation – especially near water. It can be found at altitudes from sea level to 500 m (1,600 ft).

The peak activity period for D. punctulatus, as determined from callouts by members of the public, in the Darwin region is during the northern dry season (May–July).

== Behaviour ==
When D. punctulatus is near water it often looks for long grass, blending in to hide while watching for its prey to come to nearby rocks or banks to bask or play. It will also enter house gardens that have fountains or ponds surrounded by long grass or shrubs. It is active during the day, and rests at night in hollow trees, logs, foliage, or rock crevices. It is often found resting in trees; hence the name "tree snake".

=== Feeding ===
Frogs, water skinks, and small reptiles and their eggs form a large part of the common tree snake's diet, but it will also eat small fish, mammals, geckos, and turtle hatchlings.

== Reproduction ==
An oviparous species, the common tree snake lays 5–12 elongated eggs per clutch.

== Defensive behaviour ==
Although D. punctulatus is essentially harmless to humans, it will defend itself by producing an odour from its cloaca, and may bite. Sometimes when approached, the snake inflates its body and neck to make itself seem larger, a tactic sometimes used to scare predators. Generally, however, the green tree snake in the wild will make a quick escape when it feels threatened.

== Gallery ==
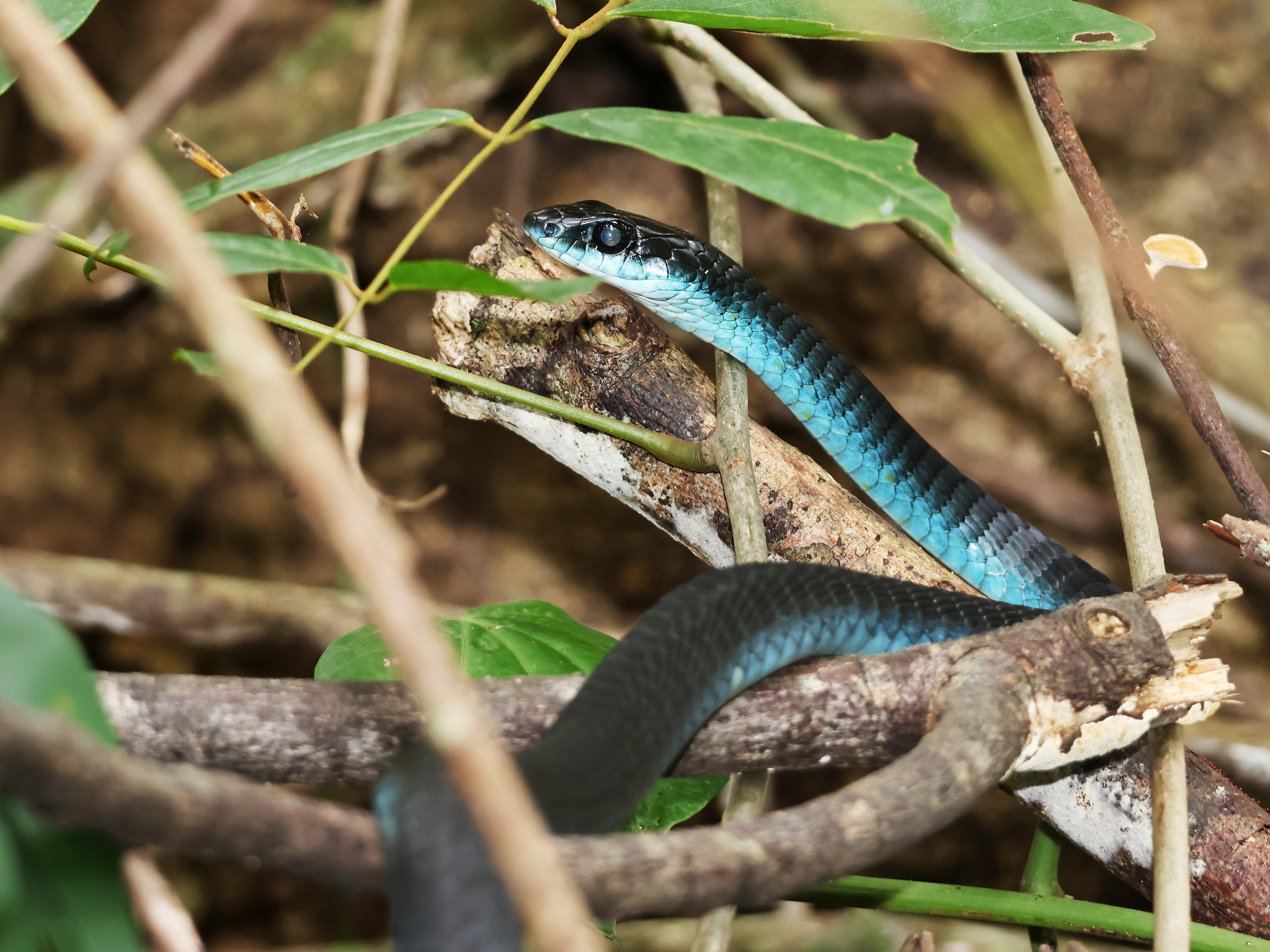
Common tree snake, a blue variation, Cairns, Queensland
