= Grey bronzeback =

There are two species of snake named grey bronzeback:

- Dendrelaphis caudolineatus
- Dendrelaphis modestus
