= Striped bronzeback =

There are two species of snake named striped bronzeback:

- Dendrelaphis caudolineatus, found in Thailand, Malaysia, Brunei, Singapore, and Indonesia
- Dendrelaphis modestus, found in Indonesia
