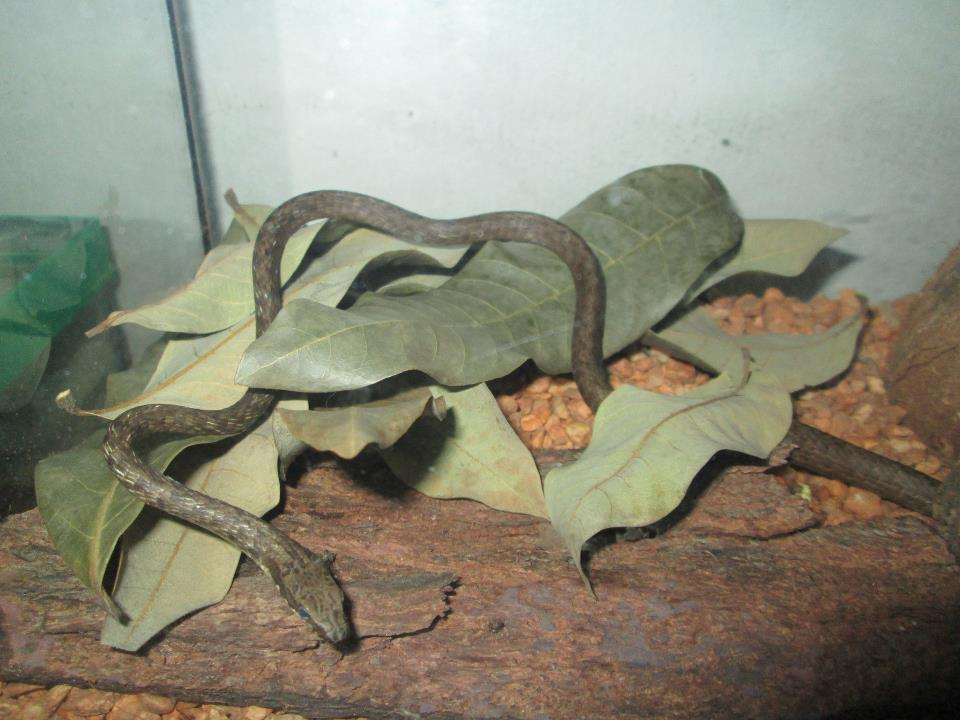

Conservation status
- Data Deficient (IUCN 3.1)

Scientific classification
- Kingdom: Animalia
- Phylum: Chordata
- Class: Reptilia
- Order: Squamata
- Suborder: Serpentes
- Family: Colubridae
- Subfamily: Ahaetuliinae
- Genus: Dryophiops
- Species: D. philippina

Binomial name
- Dryophiops philippina Boulenger, 1914
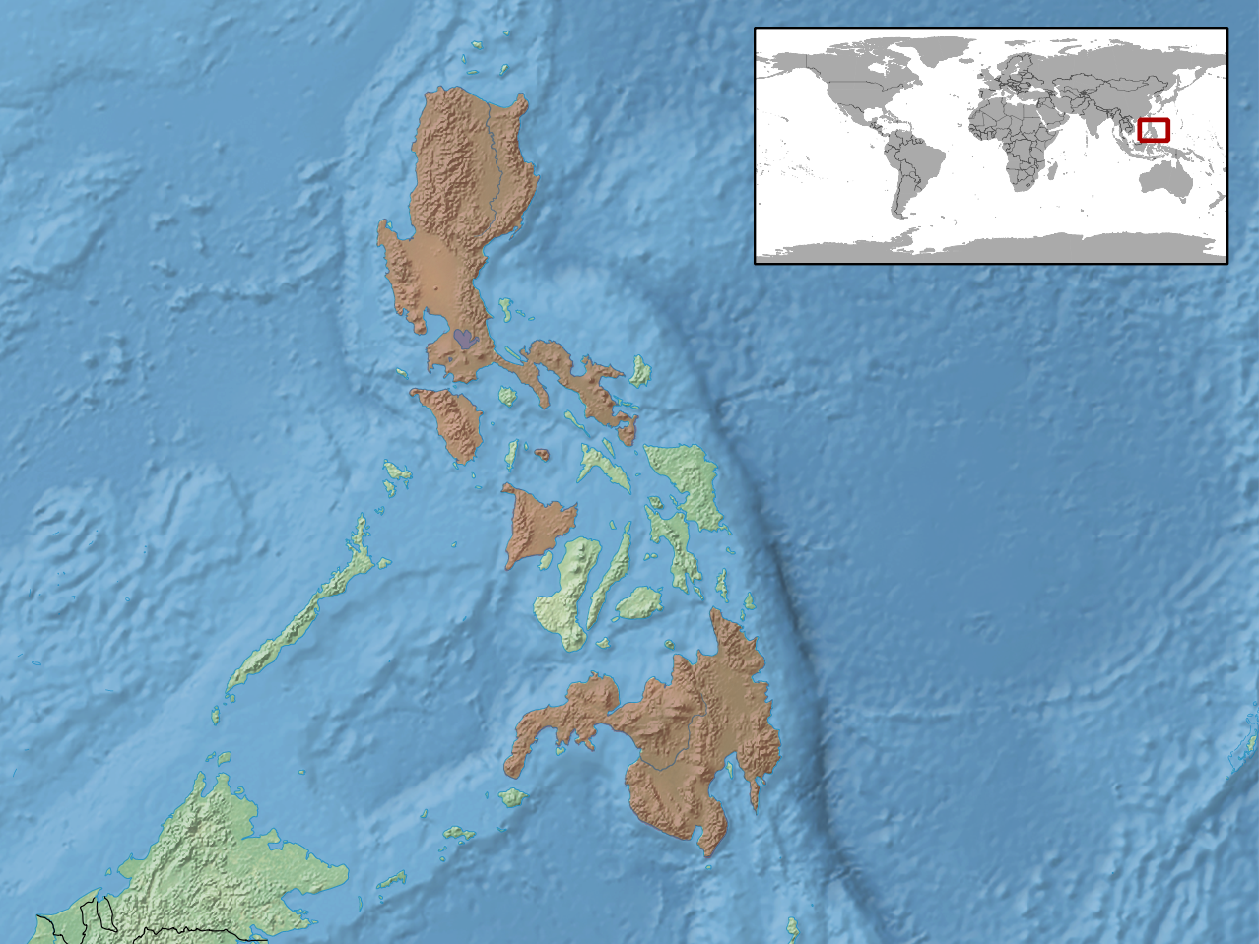

= Dryophiops philippina =

Species of snake

Dryophiops philippina, also known as the keel-bellied whipsnake or Philippine whipsnake, a species of rear-fanged colubrid snake that is endemic to the Philippines. One similar species, Dryophiops rubescens exists in Thailand and Malaysia.

== Taxonomy ==
Dryophiops philippina belongs to the genus Dryophiops, which contains only one other species: the type species Dryophiops rubescens of mainland Southeast Asia and Indonesia.

Dryophiops is one of five genera belonging to the vine snake subfamily Ahaetuliinae, of which Dryophiops is most closely related to Ahaetulla and Proahaetulla, as shown in the cladogram below:

- Ahaetuliinae
  - sharp‑nosed snakes
    - - Ahaetulla
      - Proahaetulla
    - Dryophiops
      - Dryophiops rubescens
      - Dryophiops philippina
  - broad‑nosed snakes
    - Dendrelaphis
    - Chrysopelea

== Distribution and habitat ==
Dryophiops philippina is endemic to the Philippines, where it is found in the islands of Luzon (including Bataan), Mindoro, Sibuyan, Panay and eastern Mindanao (Diuata Range). On Panay it has been recorded within primary and secondary lowland tropical moist forests, and in areas nearby. This species might need forest cover for refuge.

== Description ==
Dryophiops snakes, along with their close relatives of Ahaetulla and Proahaetulla, all share an elongated and laterally compressed body plan, with elongated sharp snouts, and large eyes with horizontals pupils specialized for binocular vision.

Dryophiops philippina is about 3 to 6 feet (0.91 to 1.83 m) long. Coloration is dark brown or black, sometimes gray above as in the Dryophiops rubescens and often with a light green or pale blue flecks. The tongue is bright red. Cream or white colored lateral stripes on each side are bisected by dark blackish lines, which are nearly continuous along the dorsolateral stripe. It has a broad head, large eyes in proportion to the head, and a slender neck. The dorsal scales are smooth, not keeled. The belly scutes have 15 scale rows at the midsection and have faint dark lines that give the impression that it is keeled. The chin is white but can sometimes be yellow. Its neck down to mid-body is yellow and the rest of the body is brown. There is one small scale on the face called the preocular scale, located in front of the eye and wedged between two other scales, called the upper labials. The scales on the top of the head are large, a feature that distinguishes this snake from Dryophiops rubescens. D. philippina also lacks the keeled belly common to D. rubescens.

== Behavior ==
It is docile but a very nervous snake. If the area where its residing is disturbed, it may spring up to flee, or remain very still. It can remain motionless for extended periods of time but usually it is always on the move. An irate individual may sometimes show aggression by expanding its neck and showing the light colorations underneath, to make itself appear much bigger than it really is, but they will rarely bite. If alarmed, they quickly move in a sidewinding manner on the ground; the only snake besides the Dog-faced water snake, Cerberus rynchops and the sidewinder rattlesnake to do so.

Although it is an arboreal snake, it prefers to roam open grounds and can often be seen on the forest floor, among leaf litter. A cathemeral species, it is active at both day and night.

=== Diet and feeding habits ===
The keel-bellied whipsnake is a very specialized hunter, actively pursuing its prey that consists primarily of geckos and other lizards. Other prey may also be taken, given the opportunity. Small frogs, fishes and slugs may sometimes be consumed.

=== Reproduction and lifespan ===
Like one of its closest relatives, the Oriental whipsnake (Ahaetulla prasina), D. philippina is also known to be a parthenogenic species. Parthenogenesis is rare among snakes but is known to exist. The majority of wild-caught specimens are females but males also occur. Mating usually begins around November up until January, where it lays 2 to 6 eggs in a single clutch, usually deposited between tree trunks and exposed tree barks. Sperm storage is also reported among this species, meaning it can lay eggs multiple times with only one mating.

Females are distinguished by their thicker bodies that ends in a short and much thinner tail; whereas males are thinner and have longer tails. Females are lighter in coloration while males tend to be darker and has a chestnut-brown tint on its head.

Captive specimens usually live around 8 years, while it lives up to 12 years in the wild.

== Venom ==
Like most rear-fanged snakes, the keel-bellied whipsnake is mildly venomous. Although its venom is said to be slightly stronger than most mildly venomous snakes, its small mouth and very small size is very unlikely to cause a healthy adult any problems. No fatalities have been reported.

== Conservation status ==
The IUCN lists this species as Data deficient. Continuous destruction of primary and secondary forests, conversion of fertile lands to agricultural and residential areas, as well as indiscriminate human killings can threaten the survival of this animal.
