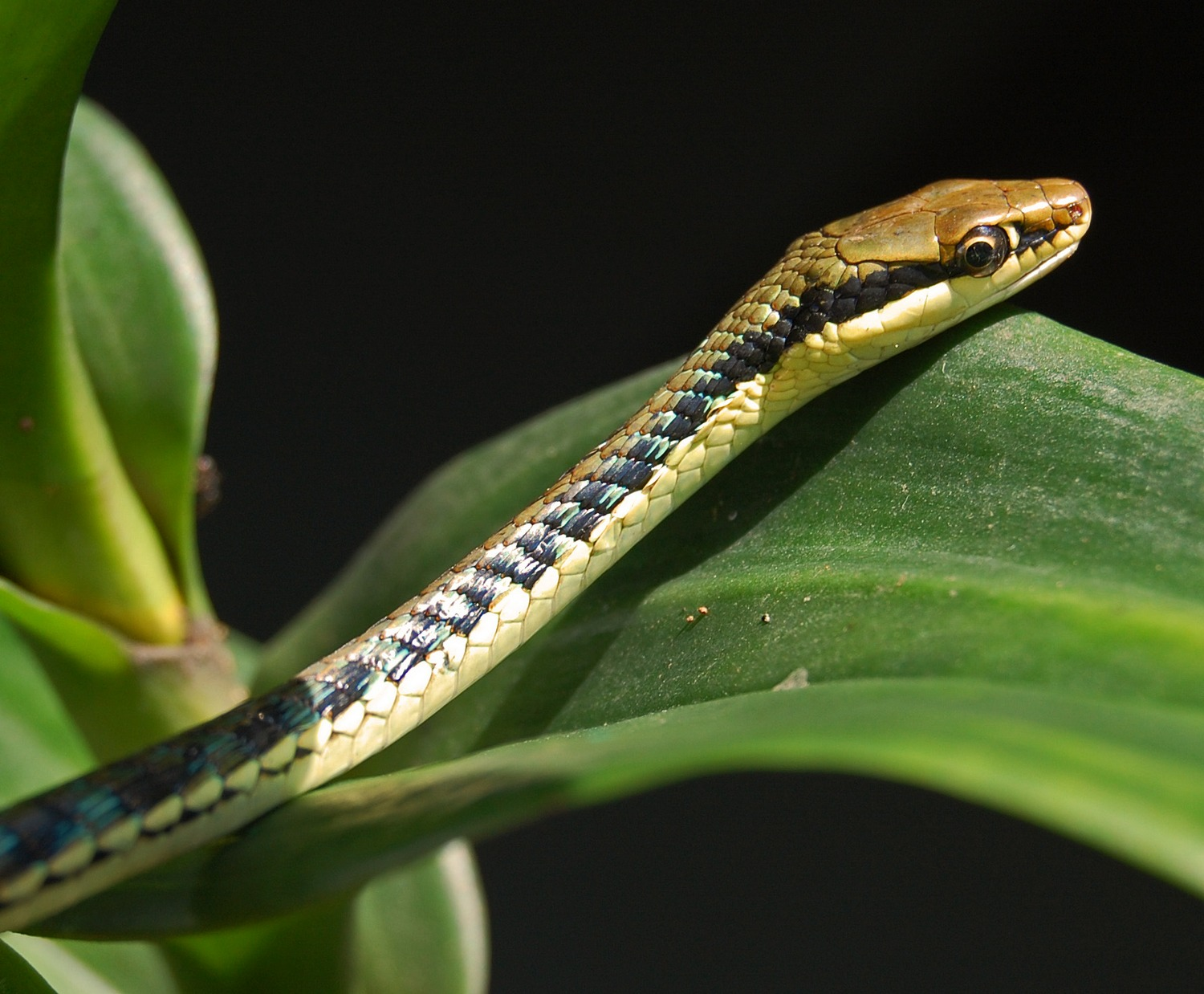

Conservation status
- Least Concern (IUCN 3.1)

Scientific classification
- Kingdom: Animalia
- Phylum: Chordata
- Class: Reptilia
- Order: Squamata
- Suborder: Serpentes
- Family: Colubridae
- Subfamily: Ahaetuliinae
- Genus: Dendrelaphis
- Species: D. pictus

Binomial name
- Dendrelaphis pictus (Gmelin, 1789)

Synonyms
- Dendrophis pictus

= Dendrelaphis pictus =

Species of snake

Dendrelaphis pictus, commonly known as either the common bronzeback, painted bronzeback, or Indonesian bronzeback, is a species of colubrid snake found in Southeast Asia.

== Taxonomy ==
Dendrelaphis pictus belongs to the genus Dendrelaphis, which contains 48 other described species.

Dendrelaphis is one of five genera belonging to the vine snake subfamily Ahaetuliinae, of which Dendrelaphis is most closely related to Chrysopelea, as shown in the cladogram below:

- Ahaetuliinae
  - sharp‑nosed snakes
    - - Ahaetulla
      - Proahaetulla
    - Dryophiops
  - broad‑nosed snakes
    - Dendrelaphis
      - - - - - Dendrelaphis marenae
              - Dendrelaphis haasi
            - Dendrelaphis pictus
          - - - Dendrelaphis ngansonensis
              - Dendrelaphis cyanochloris
            - Dendrelaphis striatus
        - Dendrelaphis formosus
      - - - - Dendrelaphis tristis
            - Dendrelaphis subocularis
          - Dendrelaphis schokari
        - - Dendrelaphis fuliginosus
          - Dendrelaphis caudolineatus
    - Chrysopelea

== Distribution ==
It is found throughout Southeast Asian forests in Malaysia, Indonesia, Brunei, China, Cambodia, Laos, Vietnam, Thailand, and Singapore. Populations from India, Bangladesh, and Myanmar are now considered to belong to the separate species Dendrelaphis proarchos.

== Description ==
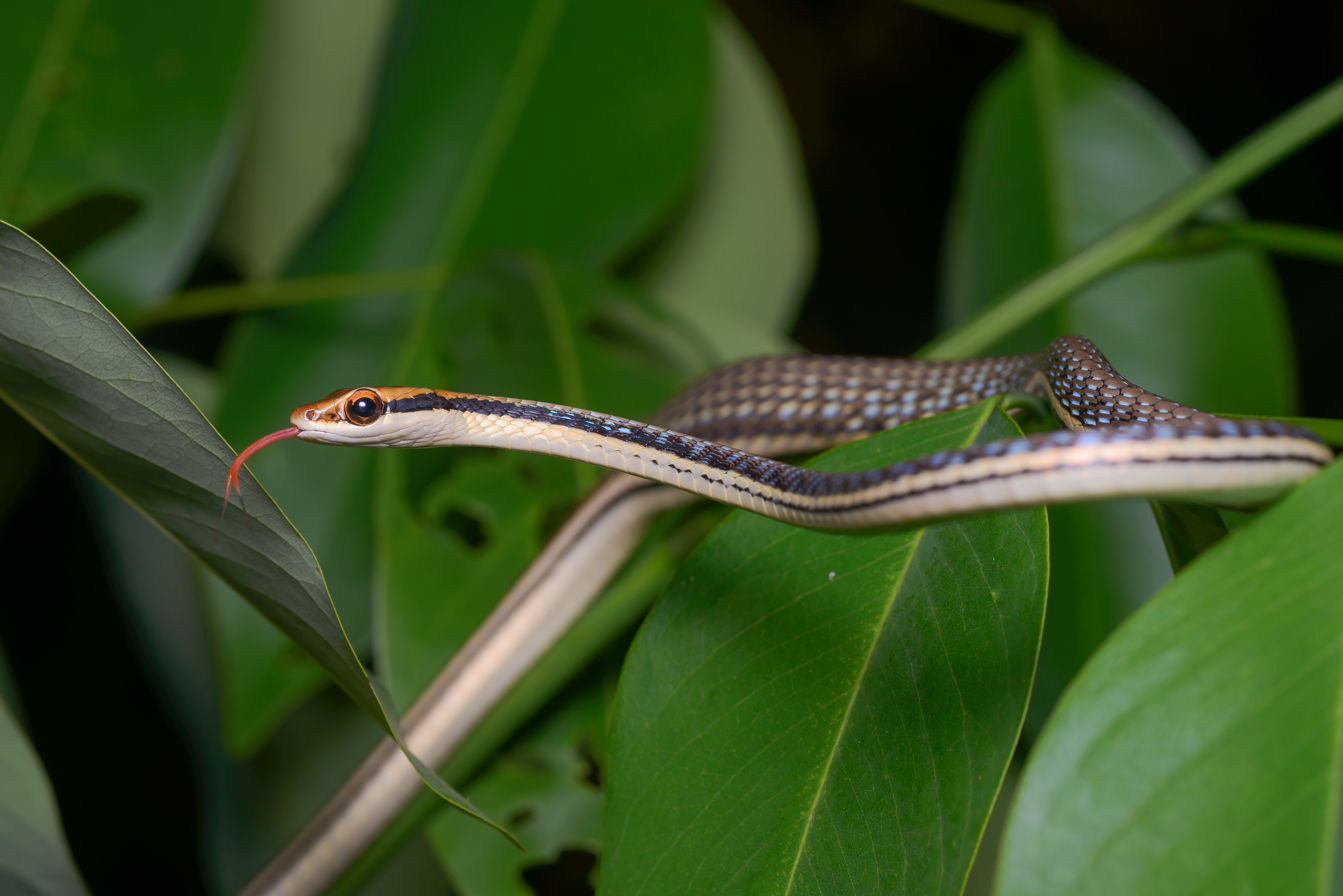
In Kaeng Krachan District, Thailand

The snake's colouration is olive or brown above with a yellow lateral stripe, bordered below by a dark line between the outer scales and the ventrals. A black stripe on each side of the head passes through the eye, widens or breaks up into spots, separated by bluish-green bands on the nape. The upper lip is yellow, and the lower surface yellowish or greenish. Length of head and body approximately 74 cm (29 in) and the tail 44 cm (17 in).

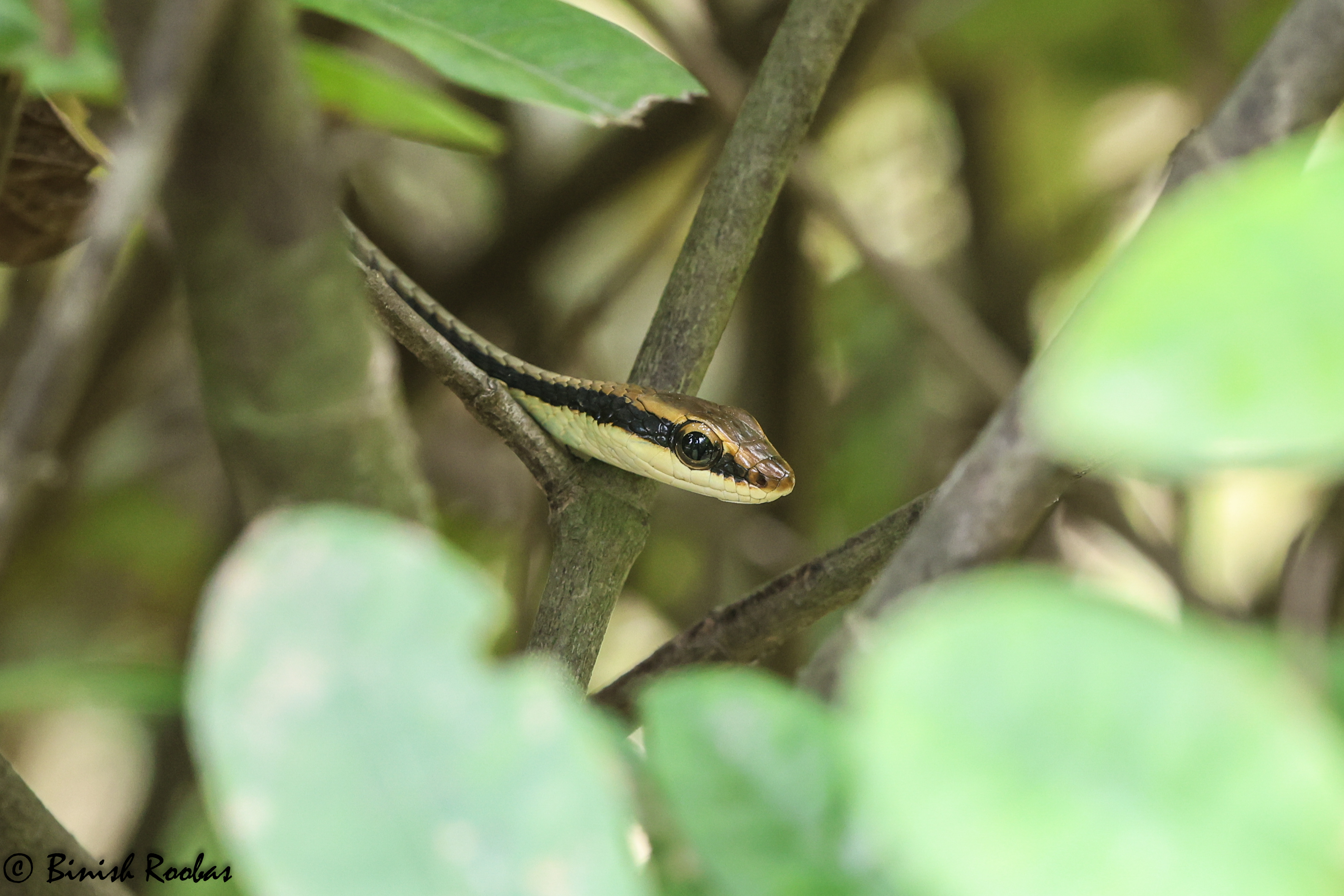
In Buddha Park, Vientiane, Laos

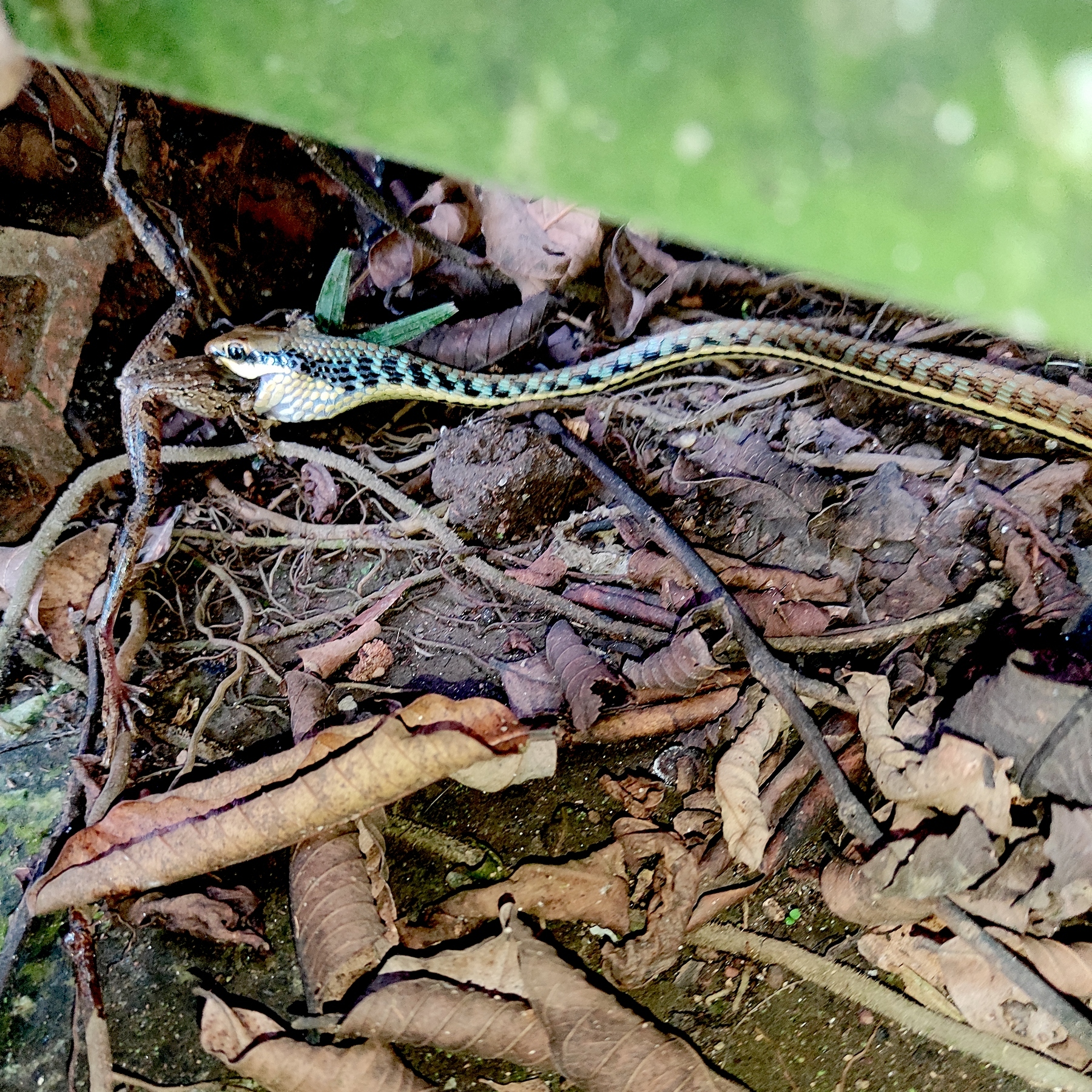
Eating a common tree frog, in West Java

The maxillary teeth number from 23 to 26, the eye is as long as the distance between the nostril and eye. The rostral scale is more broad than deep, and is visible from above. Internasal scales are as long as, or slightly shorter than, the prefrontal scales. The frontal scale is as long as its distance from the rostral or the tip of the snout, but shorter than the parietal scales. The loreal is long and there is one preocular and two postoculars. The temporal scales are 2+2, 1+1, or 1+2. There are nine (seven or eight) upper labials, with the fifth and sixth (or fourth to sixth) entering the eye. This snake has five (four) lower labials in contact with the anterior chin shields the latter shorter than the posterior, which are separated by one anterior and two posterior scales. Scales are in 15 rows, vertebrals about as large as the outer. Ventrals number 151–204, the anal scale is divided, and subcaudals number 103–174.

== Behavior ==
They are diurnal and arboreal tree-dwelling snakes, and are able to climb steep and smooth surfaces by using specialized belly scales and a gripping technique called concertina locomotion. They are even able to "jump" across gaps in tree branches using rapid looped movements, possibly an evolutionary precursor to how the closely-related flying snakes launch into a glide.

When threatened, it inflates and flattens the front of its body, spreading its scales to reveal bright blue to turquoise skin underneath.

== Reproduction ==
The snake has oviparous (egg laying) reproduction.
