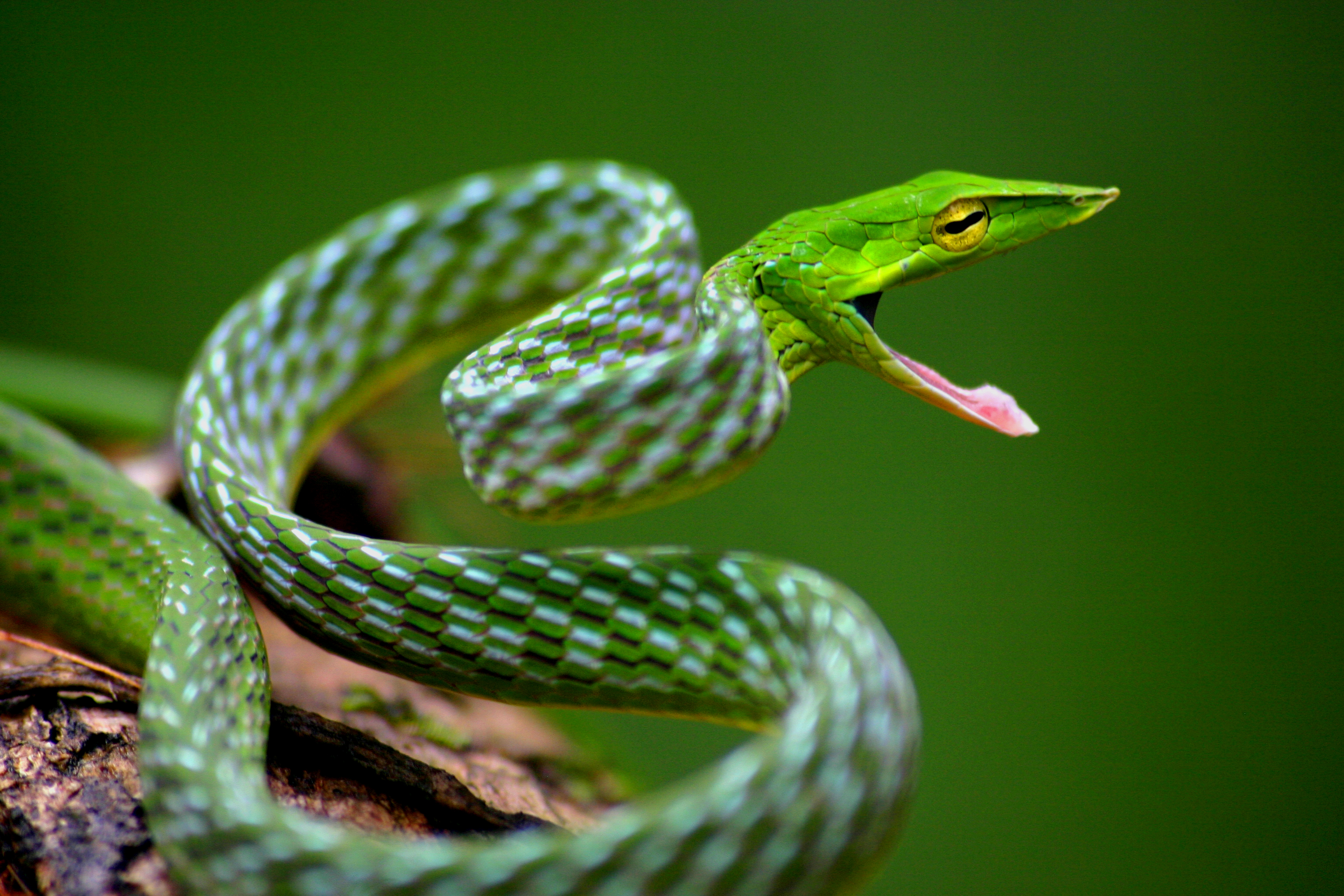

Conservation status
- Least Concern (IUCN 3.1)

Scientific classification
- Kingdom: Animalia
- Phylum: Chordata
- Class: Reptilia
- Order: Squamata
- Suborder: Serpentes
- Family: Colubridae
- Subfamily: Ahaetuliinae
- Genus: Ahaetulla
- Species: A. nasuta

Binomial name
- Ahaetulla nasuta (Lacépède, 1789)
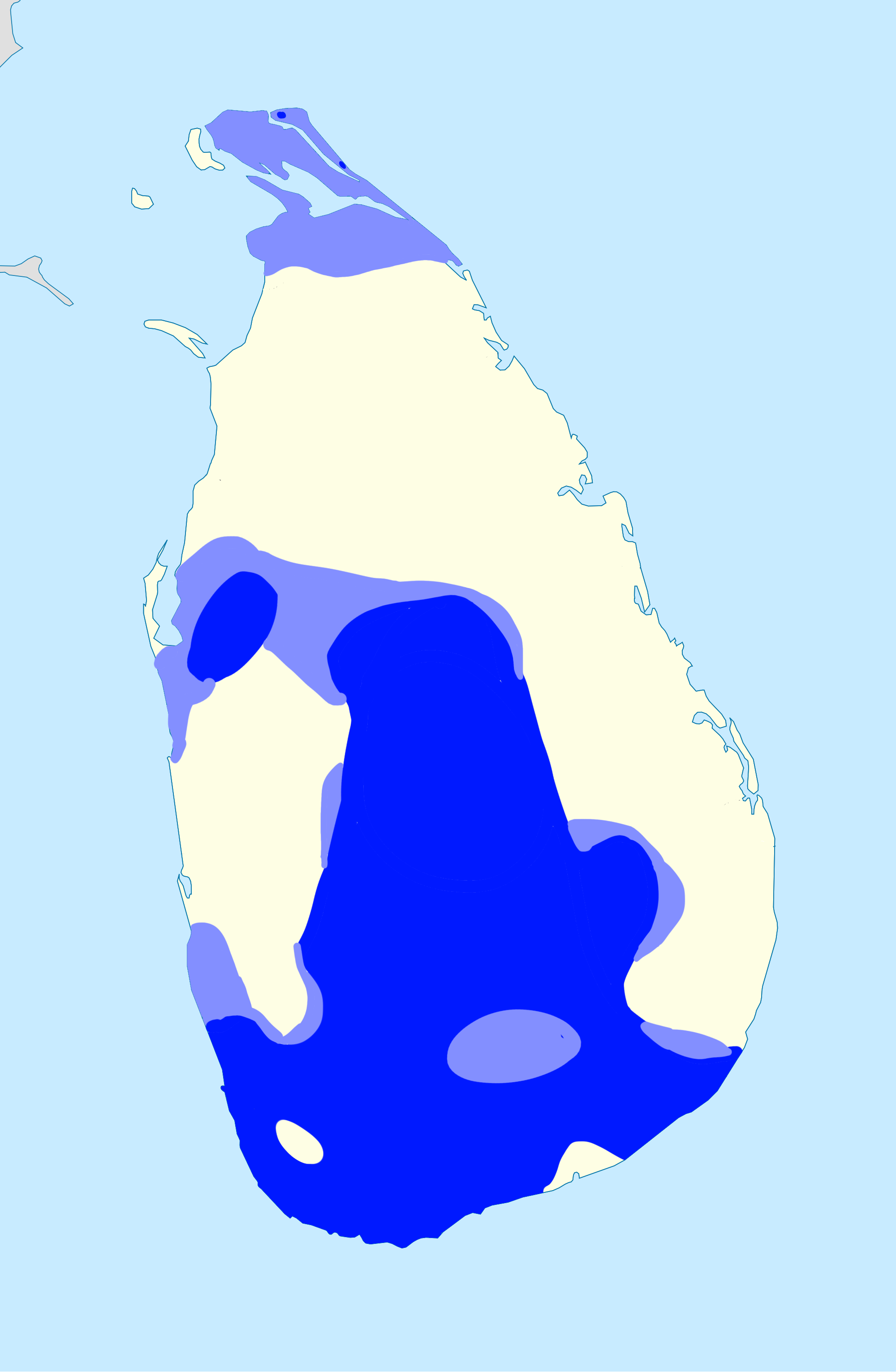

Synonyms
- Dryophis nasuta Dryophis rhodonotus

= Ahaetulla nasuta =

Sri Lankan green vine snake

Species of venomous snake

Ahaetulla nasuta, also known as Sri Lankan green vine snake, long-nosed whip snake, and long-nosed tree snake, is a venomous, slender green tree snake endemic to Sri Lanka. It was previously known as the common green vine snake and was widely distributed across India and South East Asia, until a 2020 study split them into several different species, restricting Ahaetulla nasuta just to the Sri Lankan population.

== Etymology ==
The genus name Ahaetulla comes from the Sri Lankan Sinhalese words ahaetulla/ahata gulla/as gulla, meaning "eye plucker" or "eye picker", because of the belief that they pluck out the eyes of humans, as first reported by the Portuguese traveler João Ribeiro in 1685. The species name nasuta is Latin for "of the nose", in reference to its elongated snout.

=== Vernacular names ===
The Sinhala name "Aheatulla" or "eye-plucker" forms the taxonic genus name. In Tamil, it is known as pachai paambu. In Kannada, it is known as Hasiru Haavu.

- Sinhala: ඇහැටුල්ලා (Pronounced: Aheatulla)
- Tamil: பச்சை பாம்பு
- Kannada: ಹಸಿರು ಹಾವು
- Marathi: हरणटोळ (Pronounced: Harantol)
- West Bengal: লাউডগা (Pronounced: Laudoga)

In Western internet culture, the vine snake has occasionally been humorously nicknamed as the "judgmental shoelace", due to their long, slender bodies and the horizontal shape of their pupils resembling a person narrowing their eyes in a captious expression.

== Distribution and taxonomy ==
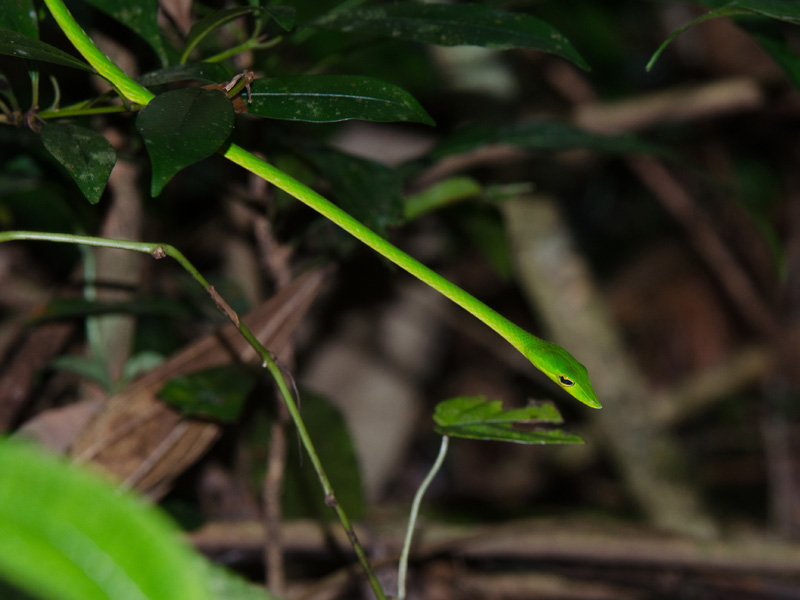
In Sinharaja Rain Forest

Due to longstanding confusion over the taxonomy of A. nasuta, the species was once thought to have a large range from Sri Lanka to peninsular India, including the Western Ghats, along with a disjunct population in Southeast Asia. Recent phylogenetic studies have since found the species to be paraphyletic, and in need of taxonomic revision.

A 2017 study reclassified the former subspecies Ahaetulla nasuta anomala as a distinct species, Ahaetulla anomala, although a 2020 study later found A. anomala to be possibly conspecific with Ahaetulla oxyrhyncha.

The cladogram below from a 2019 study shows Ahaetulla nasuta as paraphyletic:

- Ahaetuliinae
  - sharp‑nosed snakes
    - - Ahaetulla
        - - - - - Ahaetulla prasina (paraphyletic)
                - Ahaetulla fasciolata
              - Ahaetulla prasina (paraphyletic)
            - - Ahaetulla prasina (paraphyletic)
              - Ahaetulla mycterizans
          - Ahaetulla prasina (paraphyletic)
        - - - - - Ahaetulla anomala
                - Ahaetulla pulverulenta
              - Ahaetulla nasuta (paraphyletic)
            - Ahaetulla nasuta (paraphyletic)
          - Ahaetulla fronticincta
      - Proahaetulla antiqua
    - Dryophiops
  - broad‑nosed snakes
    - Dendrelaphis
    - Chrysopelea

A 2020 phylogenetic study reaffirmed the paraphyletic nature of A. nasuta, and found it to actually comprise a species complex, with the "true" A. nasuta (from which the species was originally described) being restricted to the wet zone of Sri Lanka (including the Sri Lanka lowland and montane rainforests). Four populations from the Western Ghats of India that were formerly grouped with A. nasuta were split into the species A. borealis, A. farnsworthi, A. isabellina, and A. malabarica. The large-bodied form from lowland peninsular India (and possibly the dry zone of the northern portion of Sri Lanka), which was also formerly grouped with A. nasuta, was found to actually be A. oxyrhyncha, and is actually more closely allied with A. pulverulenta and A. sahyadrensis than A. nasuta. Finally, the disjunct population in Southeast Asia was assigned to an as-of-yet undescribed species, tentatively referred to as Ahaetulla cf. fusca, and is a sister species to Ahaetulla laudankia.

== Distribution and habitat ==
This species was previously considered to be wide-spread across India and South East Asia, until the 2020 study by Mallik et al. restricted the population to Sri Lanka.

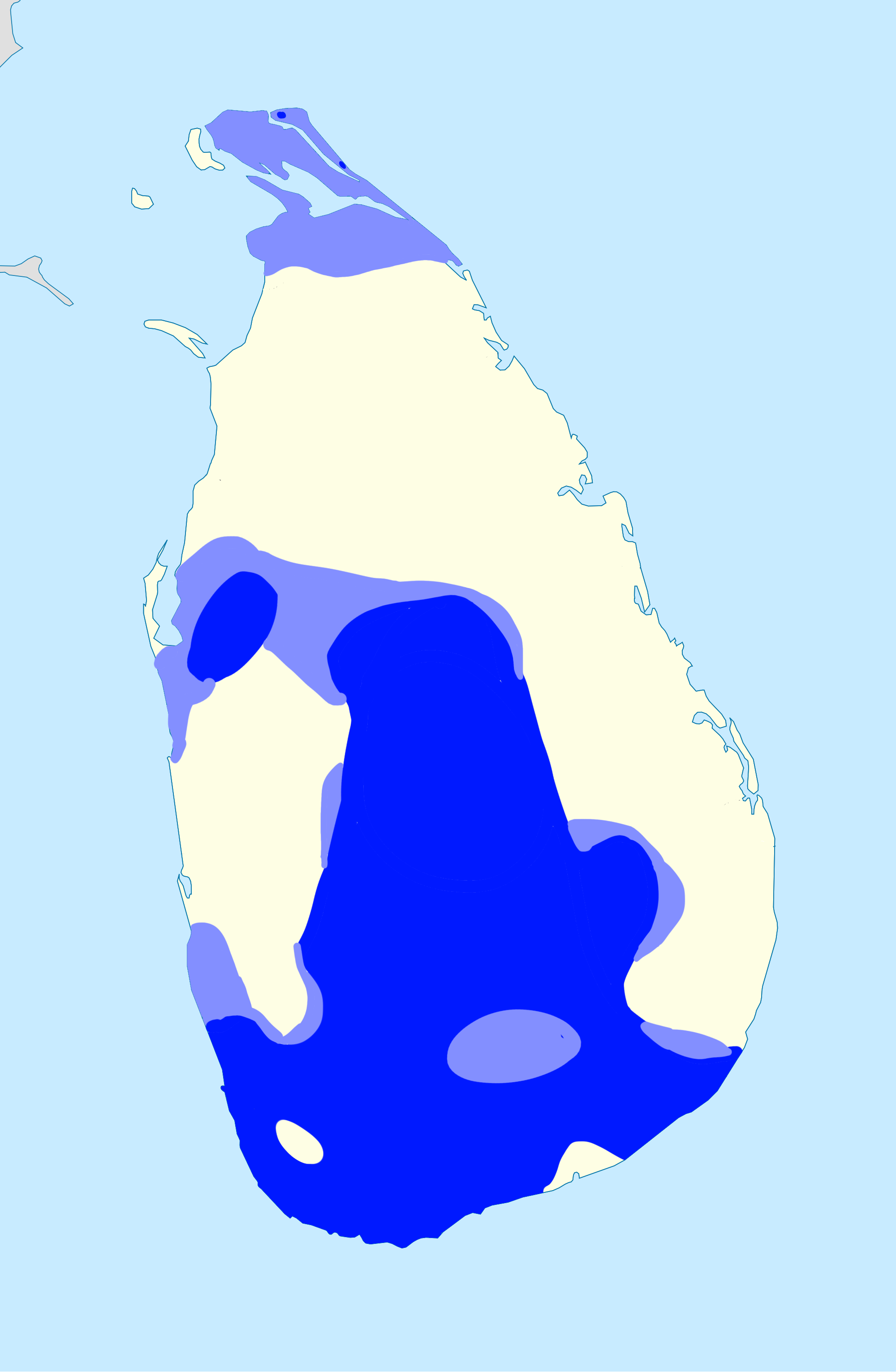
Habitat map

It is found in lowland forest and bush, often near streams and human settlements.

== Description ==
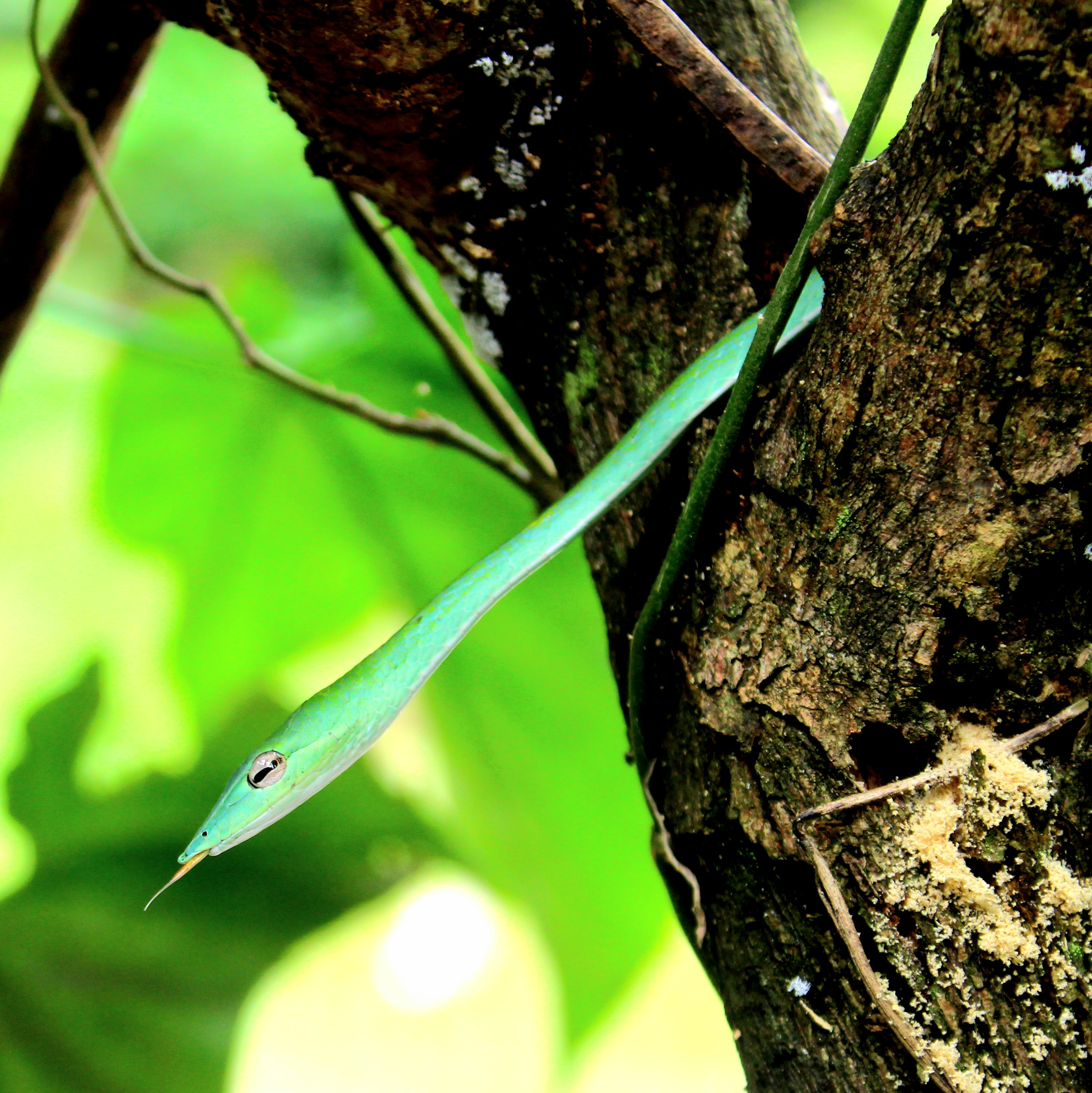
Head details

It is long and slender, reaching up to 1.9 m (6 ft 3 in) in length, with a very pointed snout. It is bright green to pale brownish in color, with a yellow line along each side of the body's lower surface, and black-and-white patterned interstitial skin between the scales. They are the only species of snake with horizontal pupils, compared to the normal vertical slit pupils found in many species of viper.

== Behavior ==
The Sri Lankan green vine snake is diurnal and arboreal, occasionally descending from the trees to search for food. It primarily feeds on lizards and frogs, but also occasionally other snakes, birds, and mammals. It is a slow-moving camouflage hunter, often extending its body and slowly swaying in imitation of a tree branch. When disturbed, they may expand their bodies to show a black and white scale marking and open their mouths in a threat display.

The species is ovoviviparous, giving birth to young that grow within the body of the mother, enclosed within the egg membrane. They may be capable of delayed fertilization (parthenogenesis is rare but not unknown in snakes), as a female in the London zoo kept in isolation from August 1885 gave birth in August 1888.

=== Venom and its effects ===
The snake is mildly venomous. Bites from this species produce a moderate reaction in humans, causing localized pain, swelling, bruising, and numbness that typically resolves within three days. Bites typically do not require medical attention, but some cases involving bites near vital organs could be more severe.
