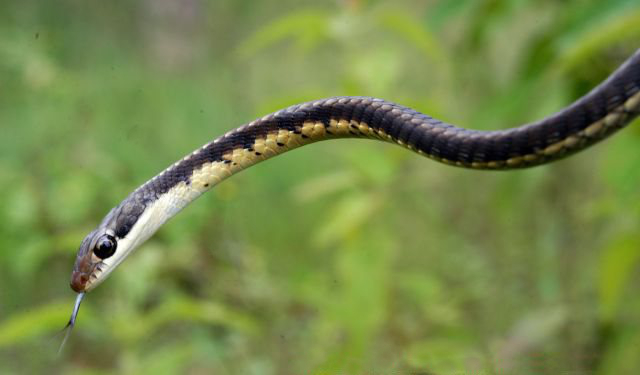

Conservation status
- Least Concern (IUCN 3.1)

Scientific classification
- Kingdom: Animalia
- Phylum: Chordata
- Class: Reptilia
- Order: Squamata
- Suborder: Serpentes
- Family: Colubridae
- Subfamily: Ahaetuliinae
- Genus: Dendrelaphis
- Species: D. tristis

Binomial name
- Dendrelaphis tristis (Daudin, 1803)

= Dendrelaphis tristis =

Species of snake

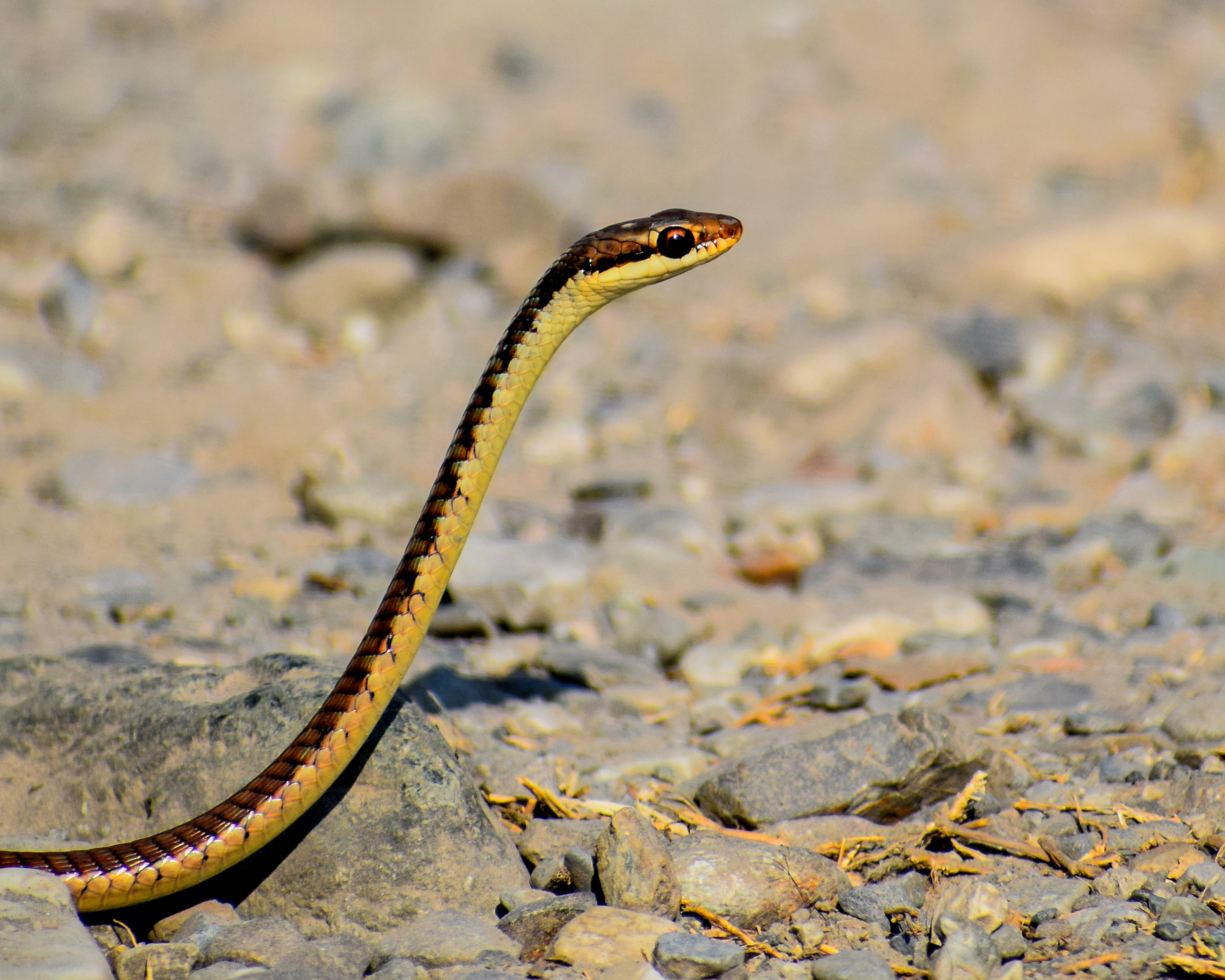
Common Bronzeback

Dendrelaphis tristis (Common bronzeback or Daudin's bronzeback) is a species of colubrid tree-snake found in South Asia. It is not venomous, and harmless to humans.

== Taxonomy ==
Dendrelaphis tristis belongs to the genus Dendrelaphis, which contains 48 other described species.

Dendrelaphis is one of five genera belonging to the vine snake subfamily Ahaetuliinae, of which Dendrelaphis is most closely related to Chrysopelea, as shown in the cladogram below:

- Ahaetuliinae
  - sharp‑nosed snakes
    - - Ahaetulla
      - Proahaetulla
    - Dryophiops
  - broad‑nosed snakes
    - Dendrelaphis
      - - - - - Dendrelaphis marenae
              - Dendrelaphis haasi
            - Dendrelaphis pictus
          - - - Dendrelaphis ngansonensis
              - Dendrelaphis cyanochloris
            - Dendrelaphis striatus
        - Dendrelaphis formosus
      - - - - Dendrelaphis tristis
            - Dendrelaphis subocularis
          - Dendrelaphis schokari
        - - Dendrelaphis fuliginosus
          - Dendrelaphis caudolineatus
    - Chrysopelea

== Distribution ==
Dendrelaphis tristis is found in Sri Lanka, India, Bangladesh, Nepal, Myanmar, Pakistan, and Bhutan, although its presence is uncertain in Myanmar, Bhutan, and Pakistan.

== Habitat ==
It is diurnal and fully arboreal. It lives in various types of forests, from dry deciduous to semi-evergreen, and has even been reported in urban gardens and parks.

== Description ==
Dendrelaphis tristis is a long, slender snake with a pointed head and a bronze-coloured line running right down its back. It is camouflaged among the leaves because of its uniform ruddy brown skin.

== Behavior ==
They are arboreal tree-dwelling snakes, and are able to climb steep and smooth surfaces by using specialized belly scales and a gripping technique called concertina locomotion.

== Diet ==
Its diet includes geckos, garden lizards, frogs, and small birds. It is not venomous, and harmless to humans.

== Reproduction ==
The snake has oviparous (egg laying) reproduction, and lays 6-8 eggs in April in tree hollows and rotting vegetation.

== Gallery ==
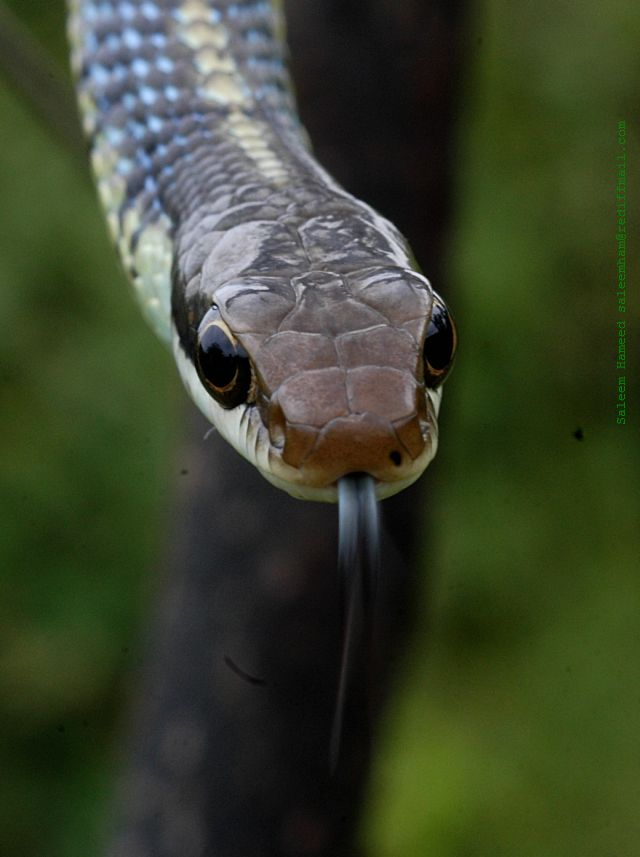

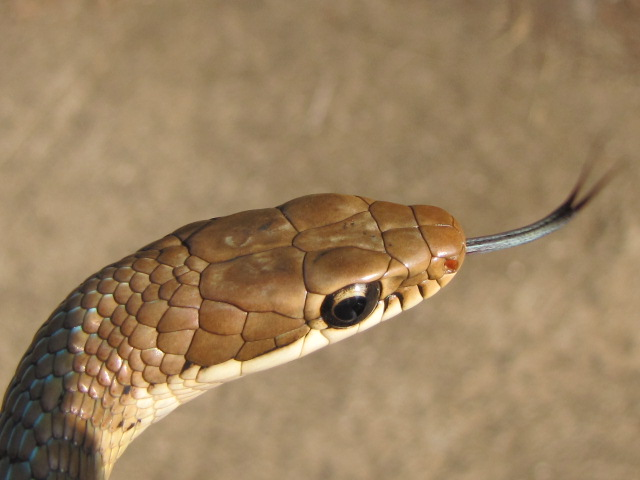
Head seen dorso-laterally

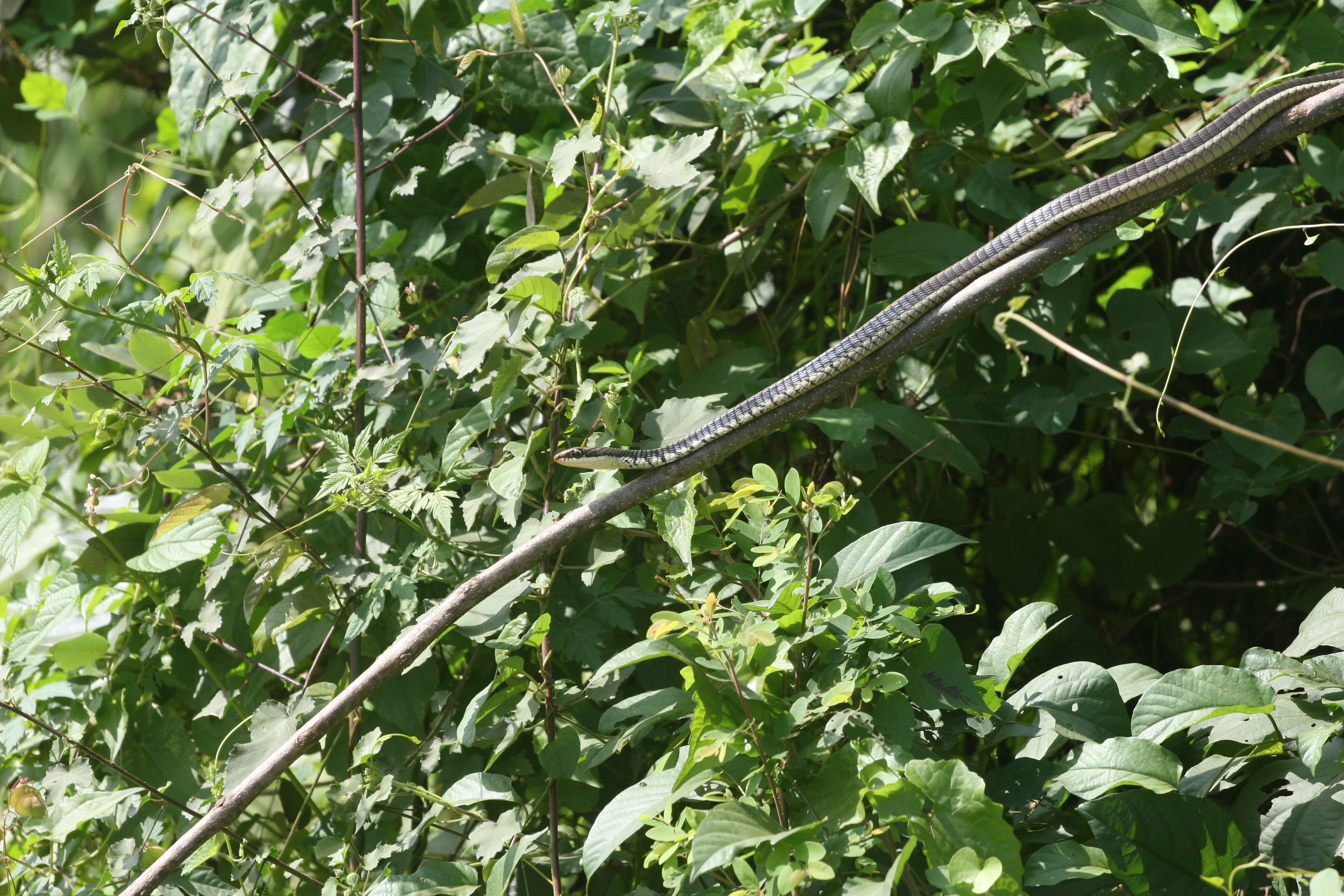
In Sri Lanka

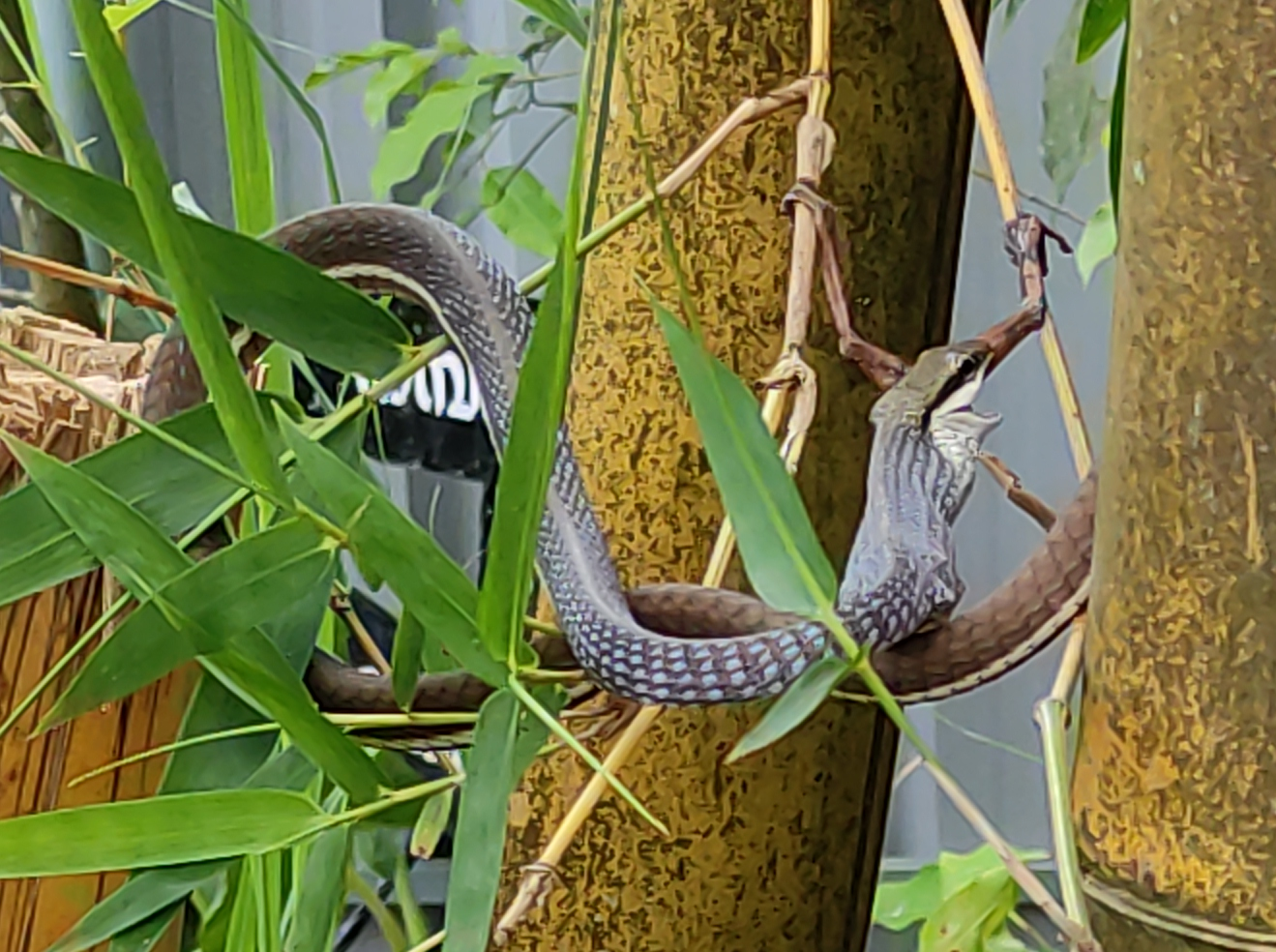
Bronzeback eating a frog

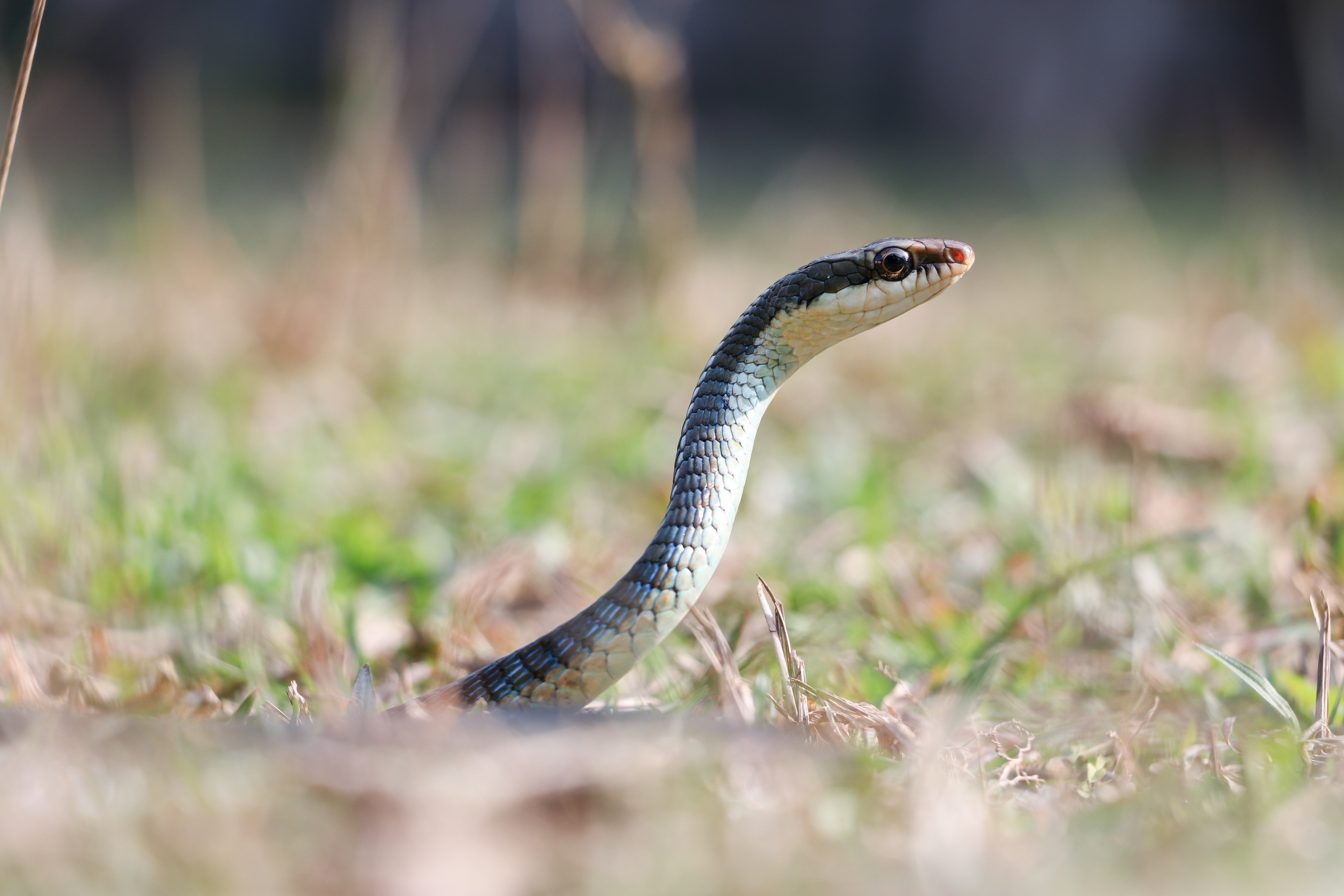
Common Bronzeback at Bardiya National Park, Nepal
