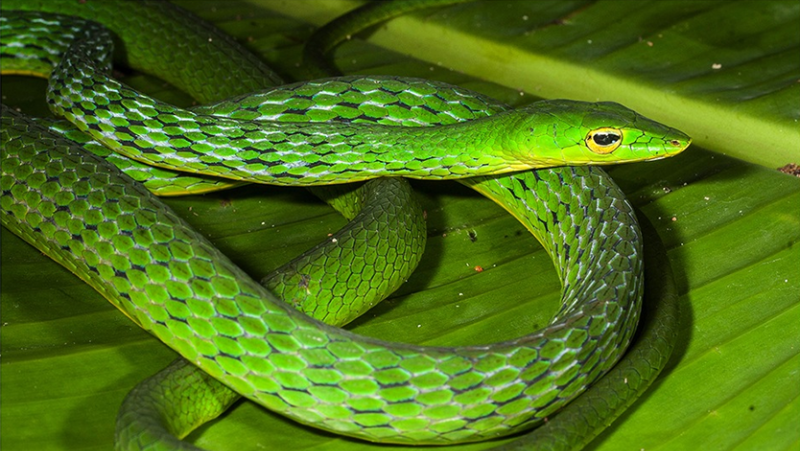

Scientific classification
- Kingdom: Animalia
- Phylum: Chordata
- Class: Reptilia
- Order: Squamata
- Suborder: Serpentes
- Family: Colubridae
- Subfamily: Ahaetuliinae
- Genus: Proahaetulla; Mallik, Achyuthan, Ganesh, Pal, Vijayakumar & Shanker, 2019
- Species: P. antiqua

Binomial name
- Proahaetulla antiqua Mallik, Achyuthan, Ganesh, Pal, Vijayakumar & Shanker, 2019

= Proahaetulla =

Keeled vine snake Temporal range: Oligocene-Holocene, 26.57–0 Ma

Genus of snakes

Proahaetulla is a monotypic genus of vine snake in the family Colubridae. It contains only one species, the keeled vine snake (Proahaetulla antiqua), which is endemic to the Western Ghats of India. Its natural habitat is montane rainforests of southern Western Ghats.

== Discovery ==
The species was first discovered in 2011, when an individual was found in the Agasthyamalai Hills of Tamil Nadu and Kerala. It was initially thought to be a new species of Ahaetulla, as it looked very similar to the species Ahaetulla dispar. However, genetic analyses found it to be deeply divergent from any member in the genus Ahaetulla, so it was classified in its own genus. Both the genus and species were ultimately described in 2019.

== Etymology ==
The genus name Proahaetulla indicates the early divergence from Ahaetulla. The species name antiqua is Latin for "antique" or "old", referencing the relatively old evolutionary divergence of the taxon.

== Taxonomy ==
Proahaetulla is considered to be the sister taxon to the genus Ahaetulla, which it diverged from an estimated 26.57 million years ago, during the mid-Oligocene. Due to its age, Proahaetulla may be one of the oldest monotypic lineages of snakes to still persist in the Western Ghats. Proahaetulla is also the first deeply divergent snake genus to be described from the Western Ghats in over a century; numerous Indian snake species have had new genera created to reclassify them from the genera they were originally classified in, but Proahaetulla is completely new, possibly having never been encountered by science prior to its description as a new genus and species.

Proahaetulla belongs to the vine snake subfamily Ahaetuliinae, and its relationships to many of the other species within Ahaetuliinae can be shown in the cladogram below, with possibly paraphyletic species noted:

- Ahaetuliinae
  - sharp‑nosed snakes
    - - Ahaetulla
        - - - - - Ahaetulla prasina (paraphyletic)
                - Ahaetulla fasciolata
              - Ahaetulla prasina (paraphyletic)
            - - Ahaetulla prasina (paraphyletic)
              - Ahaetulla mycterizans
          - Ahaetulla prasina (paraphyletic)
        - - - - - Ahaetulla anomala
                - Ahaetulla pulverulenta
              - Ahaetulla nasuta (paraphyletic)
            - Ahaetulla nasuta (paraphyletic)
          - Ahaetulla fronticincta
      - Proahaetulla antiqua
    - Dryophiops
      - Dryophiops rubescens
      - Dryophiops philippina
  - broad‑nosed snakes
    - Dendrelaphis
      - - - - - Dendrelaphis marenae
              - Dendrelaphis haasi
            - Dendrelaphis pictus
          - - - Dendrelaphis ngansonensis
              - Dendrelaphis cyanochloris
            - Dendrelaphis striatus
        - Dendrelaphis formosus
      - - - - Dendrelaphis tristis
            - Dendrelaphis subocularis
          - Dendrelaphis schokari
        - - Dendrelaphis fuliginosus
          - Dendrelaphis caudolineatus
    - Chrysopelea
      - - - Chrysopelea paradisi
          - Chrysopelea ornata
        - Chrysopelea pelias
      - Chrysopelea taprobanica

== Description ==
Proahaetulla antiqua is bright green, with a lighter green or creamish yellow belly, and a creamish yellow ventral stripe. The holotype had a total body length of 111.3 cm (43.8 in), with a very slender and partially laterally compressed body. It has a fine-pointed snout and near-binocular vision, with horizontally elliptical pupils in its eyes. It is very similar in appearance to Ahaetulla dispar.

== Distribution and habitat ==
It is a diurnal and arboreal species found in the high elevation rainforests of the far south of the Western Ghats.
