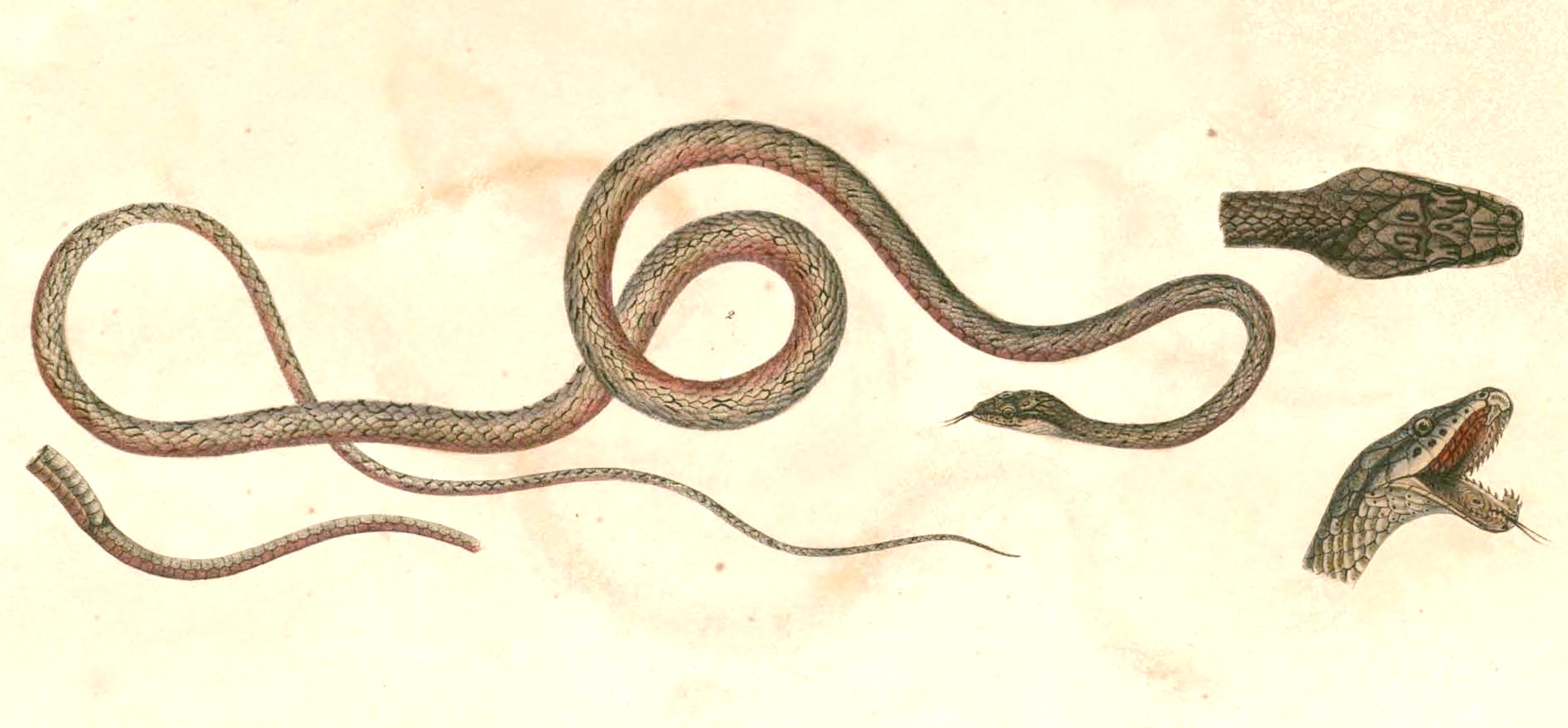

Conservation status
- Least Concern (IUCN 3.1)

Scientific classification
- Kingdom: Animalia
- Phylum: Chordata
- Class: Reptilia
- Order: Squamata
- Suborder: Serpentes
- Family: Colubridae
- Subfamily: Ahaetuliinae
- Genus: Dryophiops
- Species: D. rubescens

Binomial name
- Dryophiops rubescens (Gray, 1835)
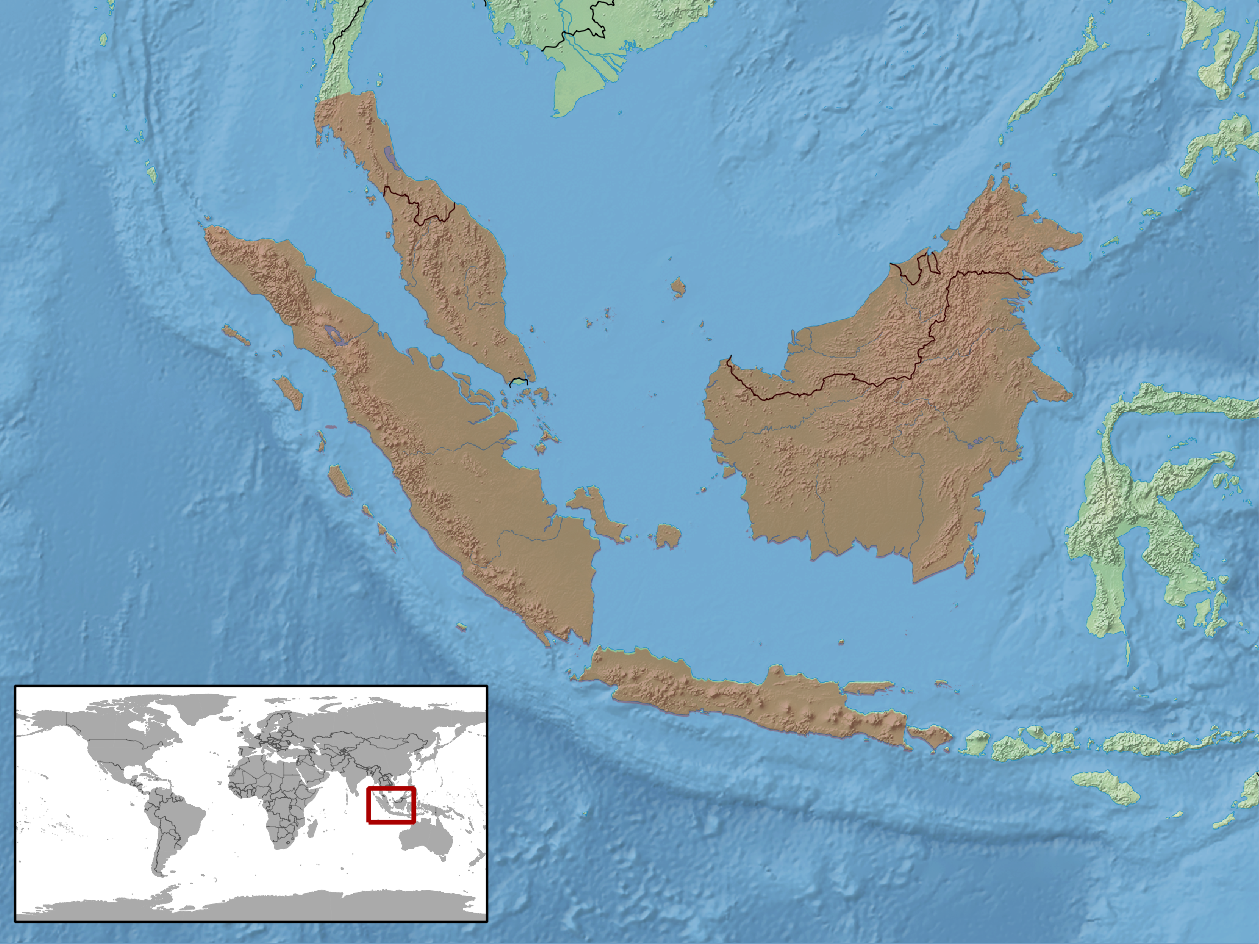

Synonyms
- Dipsas rubescens Gray, 1835; Dendrophis sumatrana Bleeker, 1858

= Dryophiops rubescens =

Species of snake

Dryophiops rubescens, commonly known as the red whip snake, is a species of snake in the colubrid family from Southeast Asia.

== Taxonomy ==
Dryophiops rubescens (originally named Dipsas rubescens) is the type species of the genus Dryophiops, which contains only one other species: Dryophiops philippina of the Philippines.

Dryophiops is one of five genera belonging to the vine snake subfamily Ahaetuliinae, of which Dryophiops is most closely related to Ahaetulla and Proahaetulla, as shown in the cladogram below:

- Ahaetuliinae
  - sharp‑nosed snakes
    - - Ahaetulla
      - Proahaetulla
    - Dryophiops
      - Dryophiops rubescens
      - Dryophiops philippina
  - broad‑nosed snakes
    - Dendrelaphis
    - Chrysopelea

== Distribution ==
The species is arboreal, found in forests in Cambodia, Indonesia, Malaysia, Singapore and Thailand.

== Description ==
Dryophiops snakes, along with their close relatives of Ahaetulla and Proahaetulla, all share an elongated and laterally compressed body plan, with elongated sharp snouts, and large eyes with horizontals pupils specialized for binocular vision.
