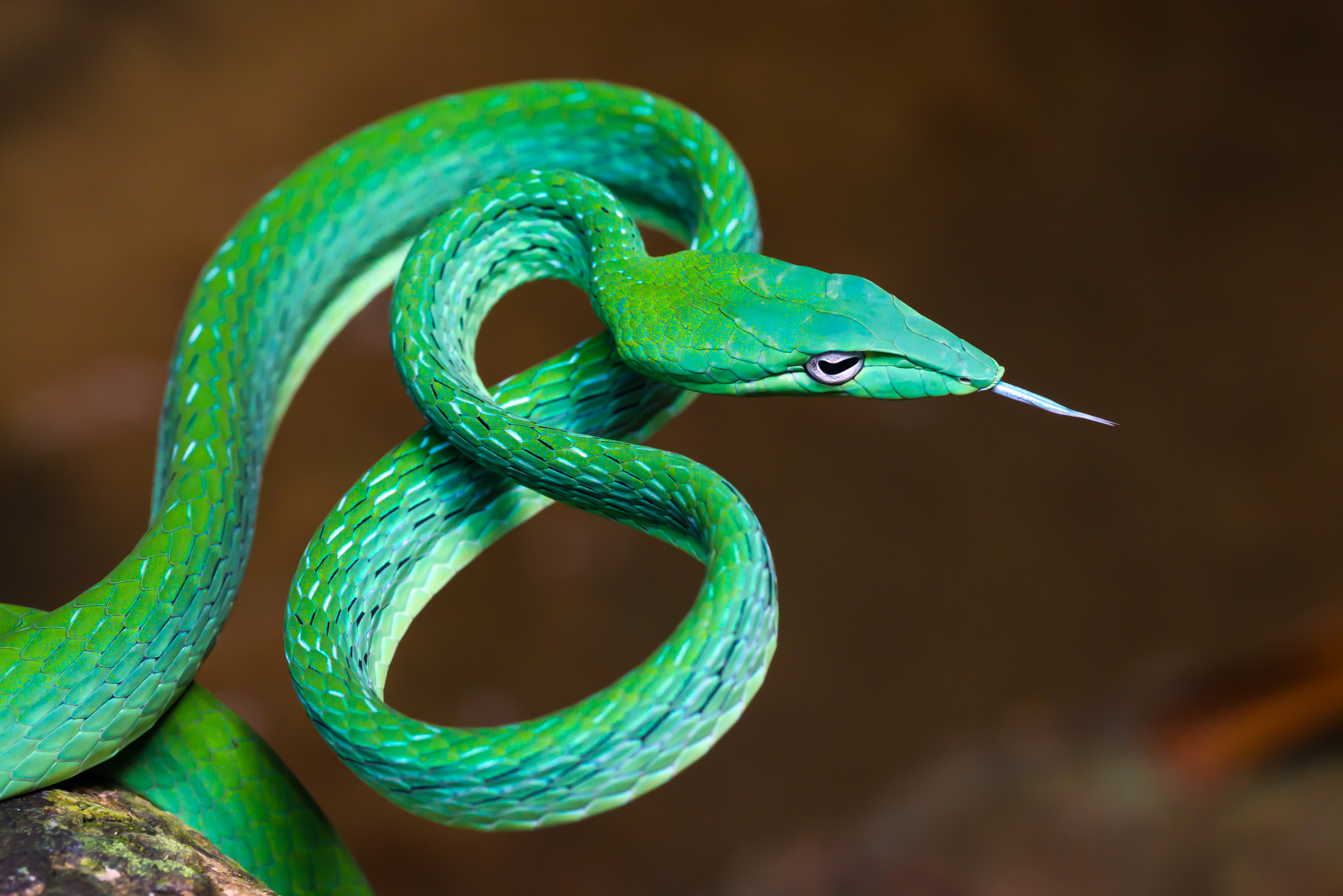

Conservation status
- Least Concern (IUCN 3.1)

Scientific classification
- Kingdom: Animalia
- Phylum: Chordata
- Class: Reptilia
- Order: Squamata
- Suborder: Serpentes
- Family: Colubridae
- Subfamily: Ahaetuliinae
- Genus: Ahaetulla
- Species: A. prasina

Binomial name
- Ahaetulla prasina (Boie, 1827)

Synonyms
- Dryophis prasinus Boie, 1827

= Ahaetulla prasina =

Species of snake

Ahaetulla prasina is an arboreal, moderately venomous species of opisthoglyphous vine snake in the family Colubridae, found in Southern and Southeast Asia. Its common names include the Asian vine snake, Boie's whip snake, Gunther's whip snake, and the Oriental whip snake (Tagalog: puno ng ubas ahas; Thai: งูเขียวหัวจิ้งจก; Indonesian: ular anggur).

== Etymology ==
The species name prasina is from the Greek word prasinos for the color green.

== Taxonomy ==
It belongs to the genus Ahaetulla, one of five genera within the subfamily Ahaetuliinae. Recent studies have found it to be paraphyletic and in need of taxonomic revision, as shown in the cladogram below:

- Ahaetuliinae
  - sharp‑nosed snakes
    - - Ahaetulla
        - - - - - Ahaetulla prasina (paraphyletic)
                - Ahaetulla fasciolata
              - Ahaetulla prasina (paraphyletic)
            - - Ahaetulla prasina (paraphyletic)
              - Ahaetulla mycterizans
          - Ahaetulla prasina (paraphyletic)
        - - - - - Ahaetulla anomala
                - Ahaetulla pulverulenta
              - Ahaetulla nasuta (paraphyletic)
            - Ahaetulla nasuta (paraphyletic)
          - Ahaetulla fronticincta
      - Proahaetulla antiqua
    - Dryophiops
  - broad‑nosed snakes
    - Dendrelaphis
    - Chrysopelea

=== Subspecies ===
Four subspecies are recognized, including the nominate race.

- Ahaetulla prasina medioxima Lazell, 2002
- Ahaetulla prasina preocularis (Taylor, 1922): Philippine Islands, including Sulu Archipelago, Panay, Luzon.
- Ahaetulla prasina prasina (Boie, 1827)
- Ahaetulla prasina suluensis Gaulke, 1994: Philippine Islands, Sulu Archipelago

== Distribution ==
This snake has a wide distribution in Asia, where it occurs in Bangladesh, Bhutan, Brunei, Burma, Cambodia, China, India, Indonesia, Laos, Malaysia, Philippines, Singapore, Thailand, and Vietnam.

== Description ==
The body form is extremely slender with a long, pointed, projecting snout that is rather more than twice as long as the eye. Adult colouration varies from light brown to dull yellow-green and often a startling fluorescent green. Adults may attain 1.8 m (6 feet) in total length, with a tail 0.6 m (2 feet) long. Its appearance is very much like those of South American vine snakes. This is due to convergent evolution, as they are not closely related.

It is a rear-fanged species and is mildly venomous but is not considered a threat to humans. It is diurnal, active during the day.

== Diet ==
The Asian vine snake feeds on small reptiles and amphibians, particularly lizards and tree frogs.

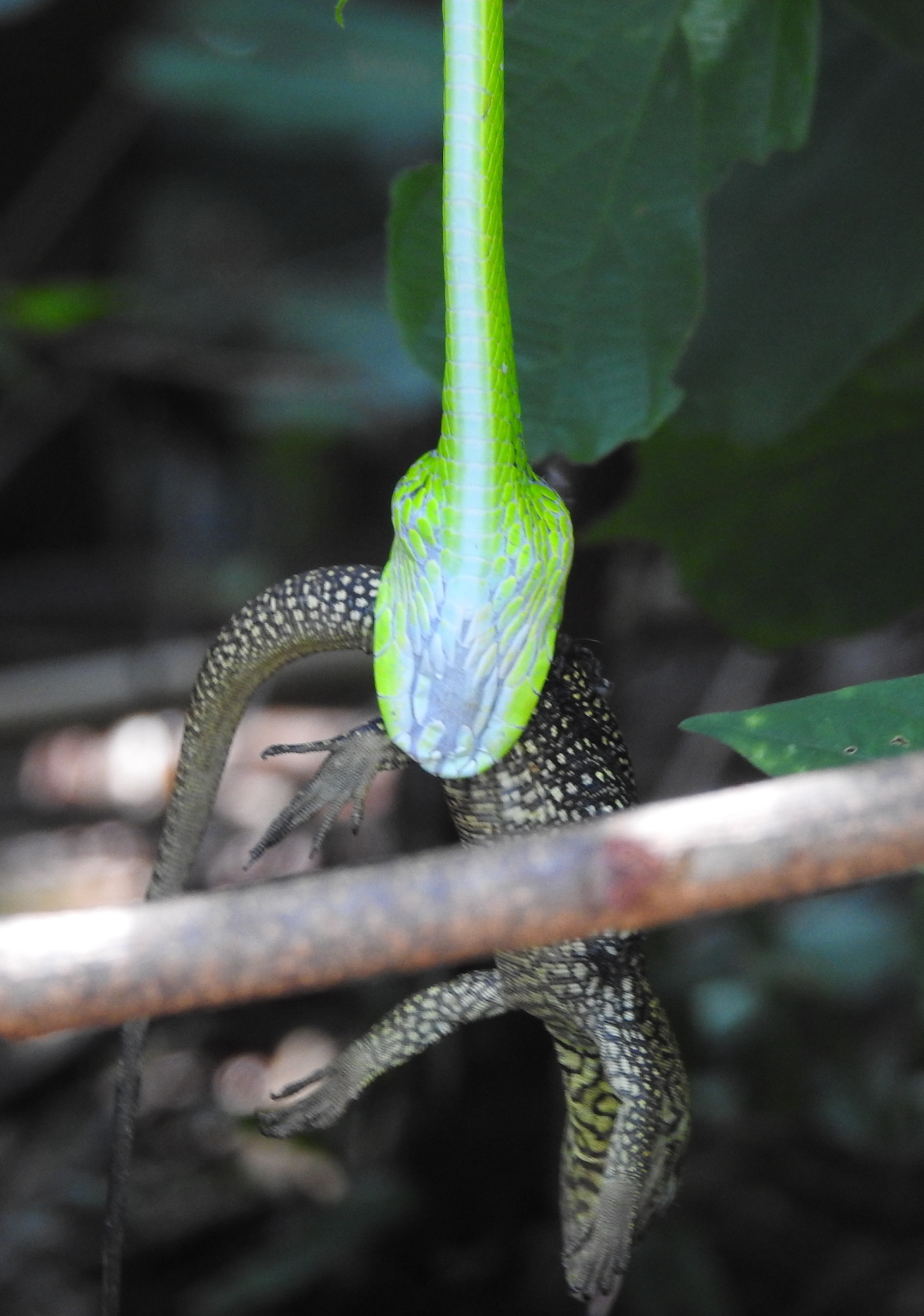
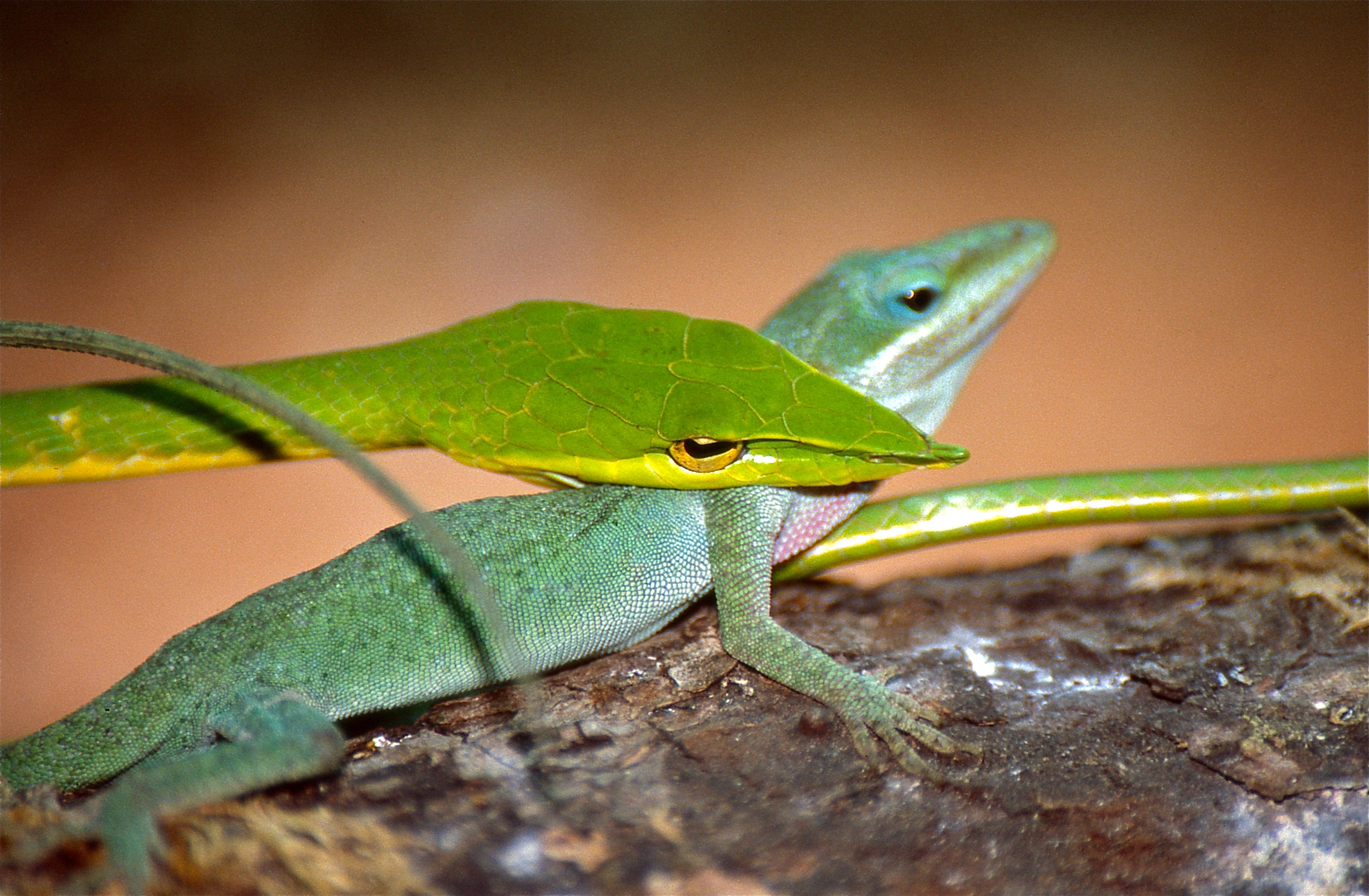
Left: Eating a juvenile clouded monitor, in the wild. Right: Eating a green anole, in captivity.

== In captivity ==
In recent years, it has entered the pet trade and has become quite popular among hobbyists.

== Gallery ==
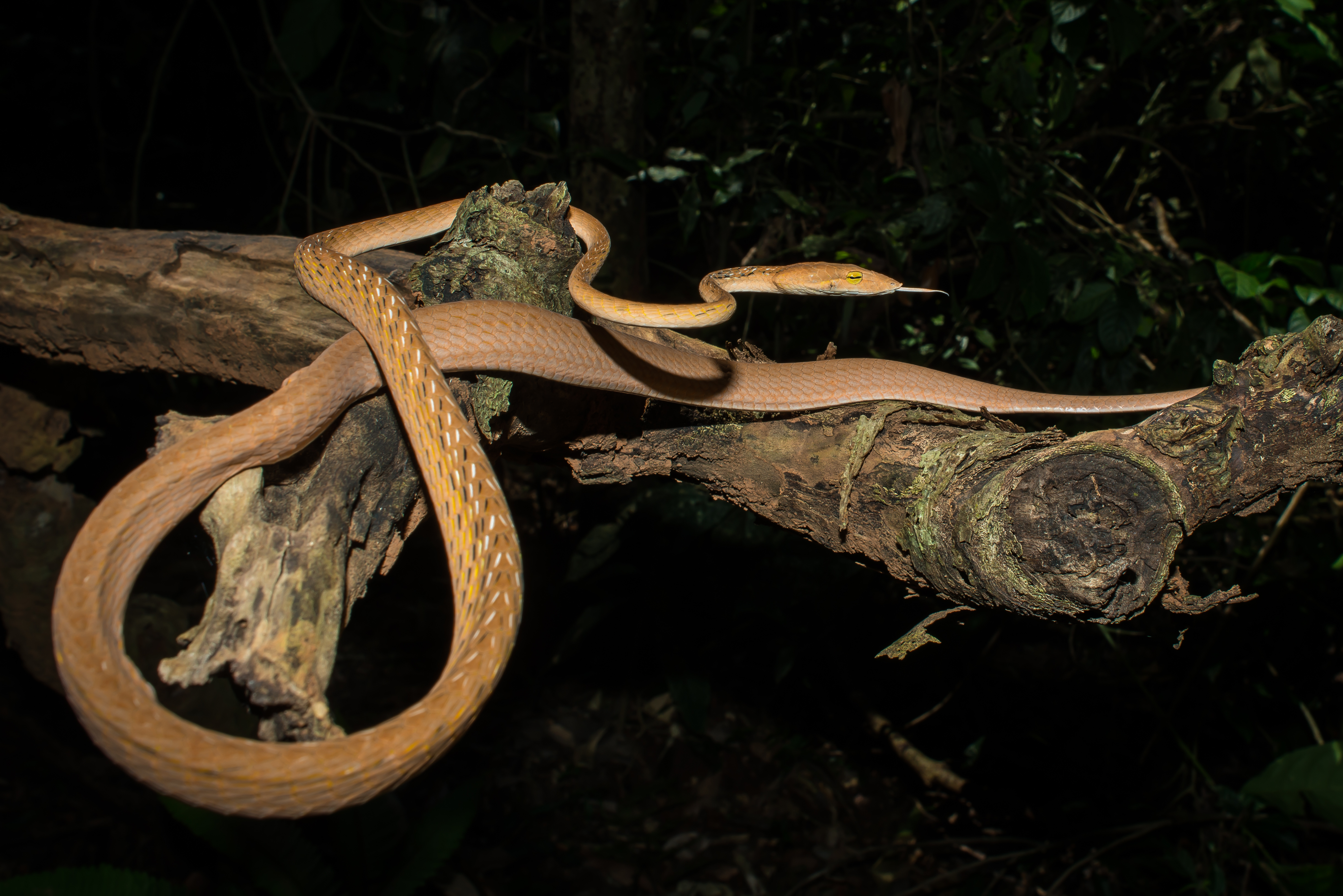

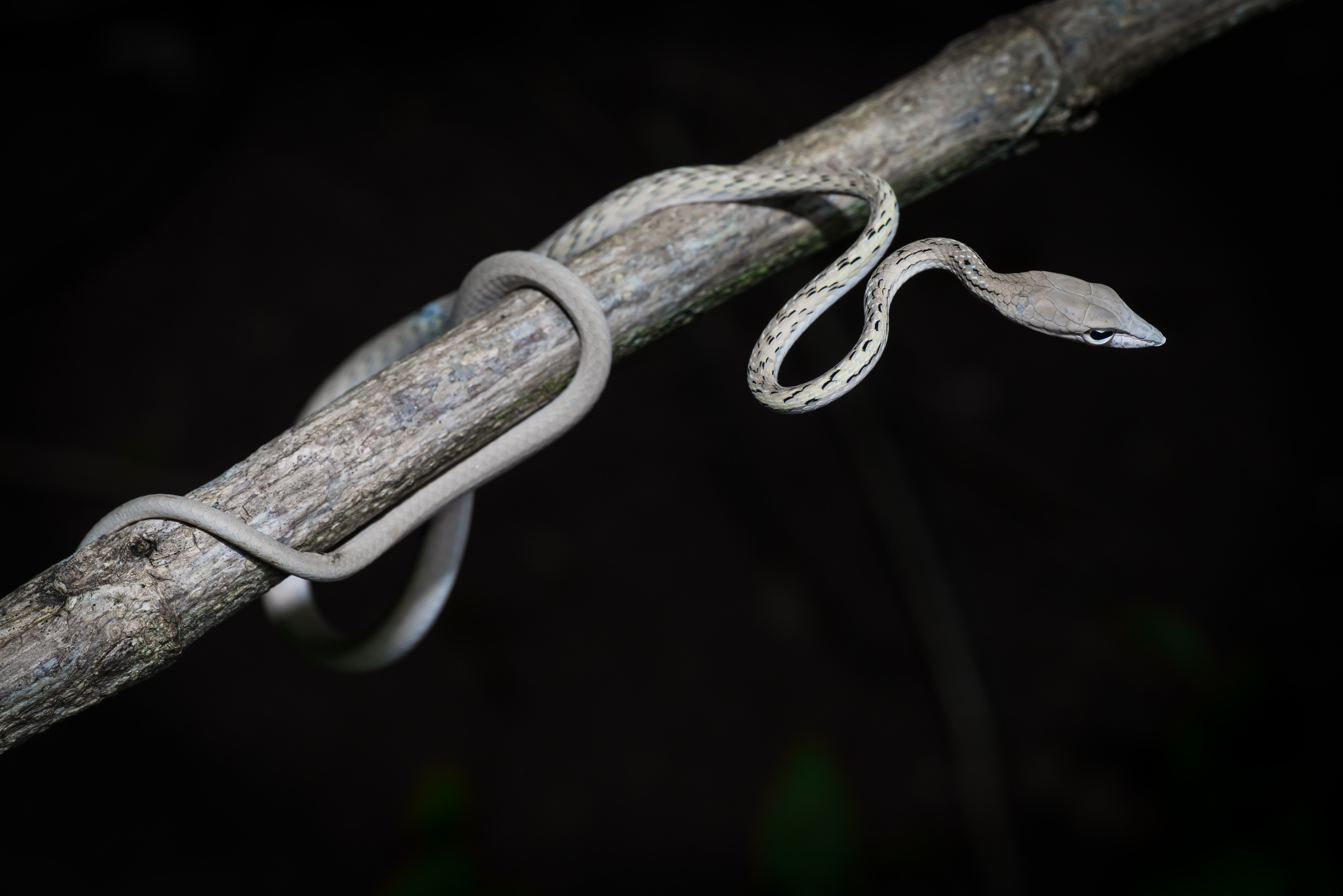

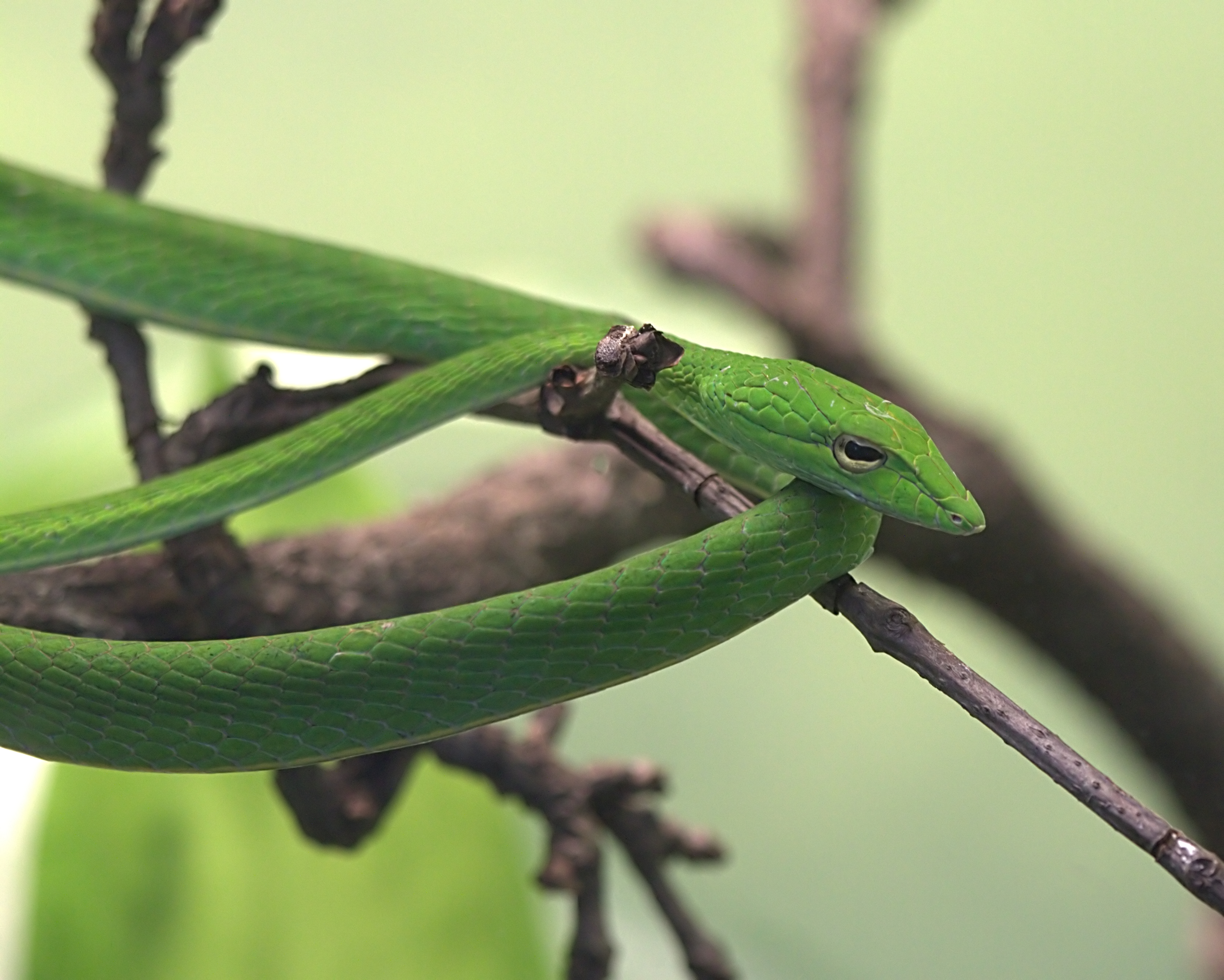

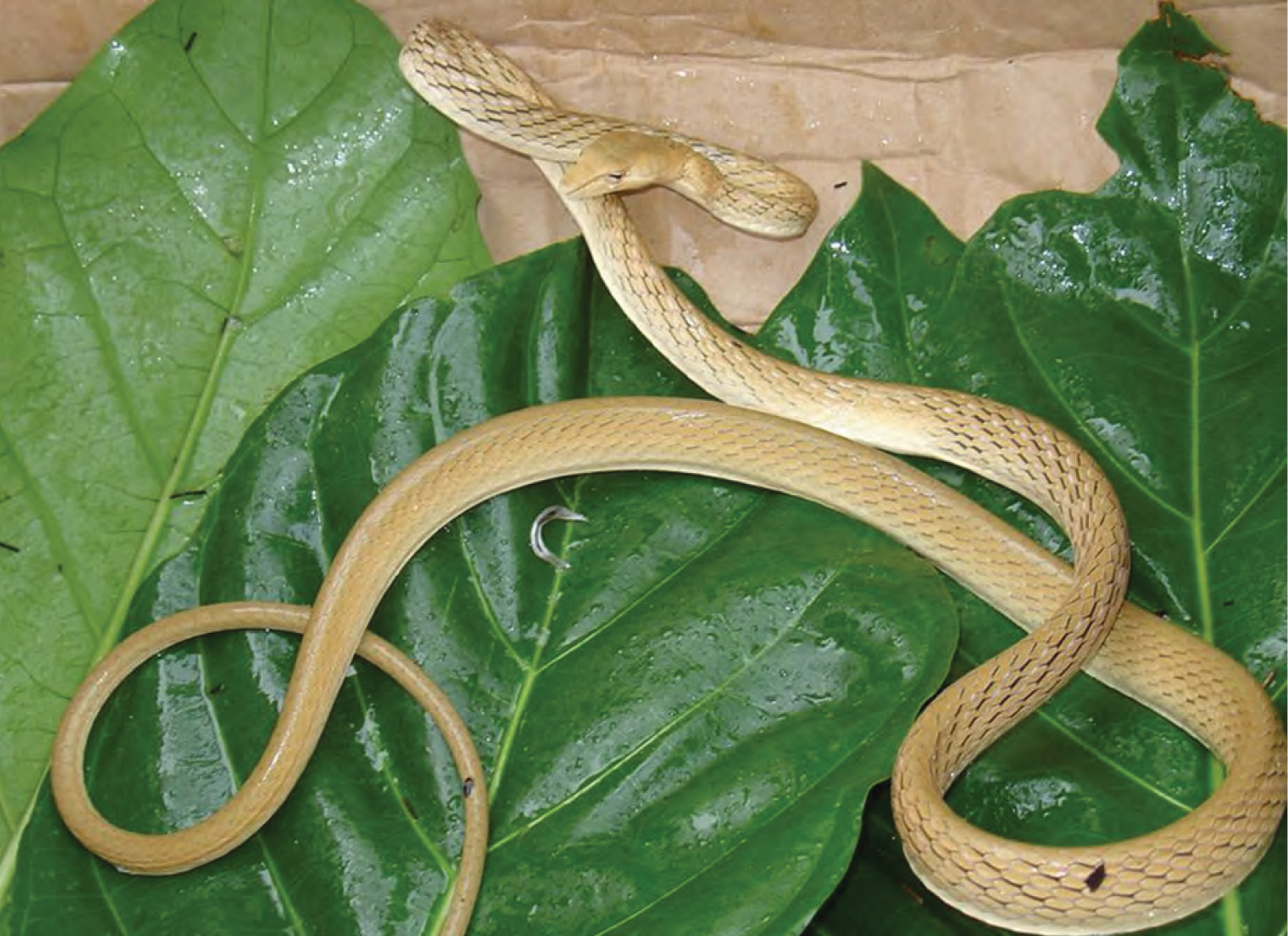
