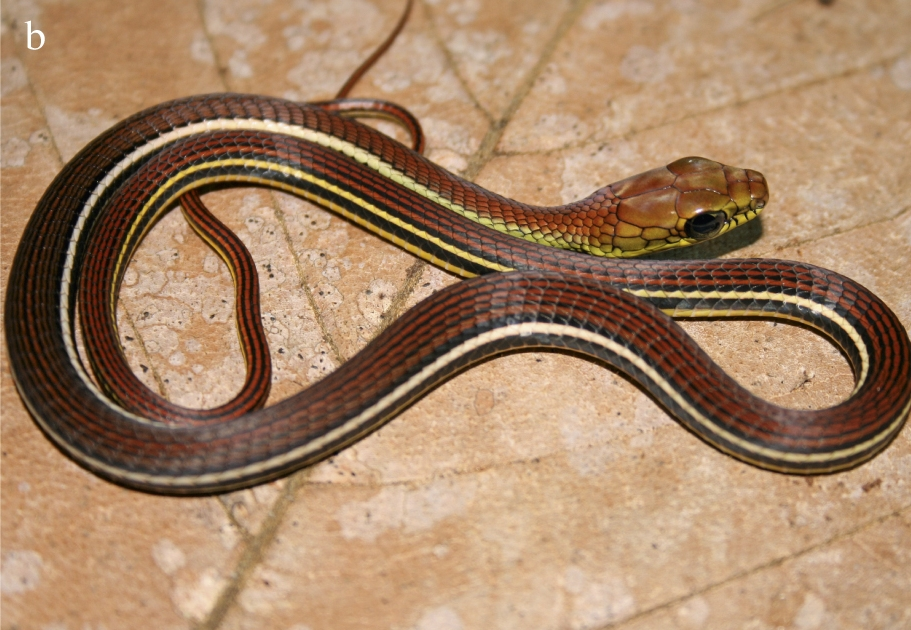

Conservation status
- Least Concern (IUCN 3.1)

Scientific classification
- Kingdom: Animalia
- Phylum: Chordata
- Order: Squamata
- Suborder: Serpentes
- Family: Colubridae
- Subfamily: Ahaetuliinae
- Genus: Dendrelaphis
- Species: D. caudolineatus

Binomial name
- Dendrelaphis caudolineatus (JE Gray, 1834)

= Dendrelaphis caudolineatus =

Species of snake

Dendrelaphis caudolineatus, commonly known as the striped bronzeback or grey bronzeback, is a species of colubrid snake found in Southeast Asia.

== Etymology ==
When John Edward Gray first scientifically described the species in 1834, he did not provide the origin of the scientific name caudolineatus. However, in Latin "cauda" means tail and "linea" mean line, possibly referencing the longitudinal lines reaching from head to tail.

== Taxonomy ==
Dendrelaphis caudolineatus belongs to the genus Dendrelaphis, which contains 48 other described species. Prior to a 2012 study, several other species of Dendrelaphis were previously considered to be members of Dendrelaphis caudolineatus, but are now considered to be separate species: D. flavescens, D. terrificus, D. philippinensis, and D. levitoni.

Dendrelaphis is one of five genera belonging to the vine snake subfamily Ahaetuliinae, of which Dendrelaphis is most closely related to Chrysopelea, as shown in the cladogram below:

- Ahaetuliinae
  - sharp‑nosed snakes
    - - Ahaetulla
      - Proahaetulla
    - Dryophiops
  - broad‑nosed snakes
    - Dendrelaphis
      - - - - - Dendrelaphis marenae
              - Dendrelaphis haasi
            - Dendrelaphis pictus
          - - - Dendrelaphis ngansonensis
              - Dendrelaphis cyanochloris
            - Dendrelaphis striatus
        - Dendrelaphis formosus
      - - - - Dendrelaphis tristis
            - Dendrelaphis subocularis
          - Dendrelaphis schokari
        - - Dendrelaphis fuliginosus
          - Dendrelaphis caudolineatus
    - Chrysopelea

== Distribution ==
Dendrelaphis caudolineatus is found in Malaysia, Thailand, Indonesia, Brunei, and Singapore.

== Habitat ==
It is found in a wide variety of forested habitats, commonly seen in trees and bushes, most often near swamps and streams. It can be found in gardens and cultivated areas. It is widespread, and one of the most commonly seen snakes in its range.

== Description ==
Dendrelaphis caudolineatus is a rather small and thin snake, it can reach a length of 180 centimeters but is usually closer to 140 cm. The males are usually thinner than females but are more colorful, ranging from a reddish shade or bright chestnut brown, to a shiny bronze color. The females are usually dull-colored, and more stout-bodied than the males. It is also observed that females of this species tend to be less active than the males.

== Behavior ==
The snake is diurnal and fully arboreal, and has oviparous reproduction, laying clutches of five to eight eggs. It feeds mainly on lizards and tree frogs.

== Pet trade ==
It is commonly sold as a pet in the legal pet trade, with the exception of Thailand, where it is illegal to export snakes.
