= Dendrelaphis modestus =

Conservation status
- Least Concern (IUCN 3.1)

Scientific classification
- Kingdom: Animalia
- Phylum: Chordata
- Class: Reptilia
- Order: Squamata
- Suborder: Serpentes
- Family: Colubridae
- Subfamily: Ahaetuliinae
- Genus: Dendrelaphis
- Species: D. modestus

Binomial name
- Dendrelaphis modestus Boulenger, 1894

Species of snake

Dendrelaphis modestus, the grey bronzeback or striped bronzeback, is a species of snake in the family Colubridae. The species is found in Indonesia.
