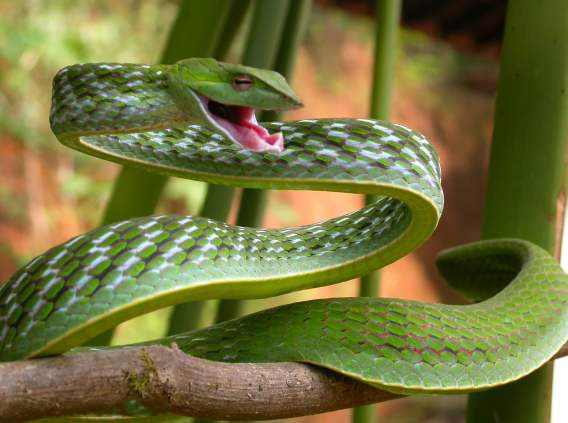
- Ahaetulla sp.

Scientific classification
- Kingdom: Animalia
- Phylum: Chordata
- Class: Reptilia
- Order: Squamata
- Suborder: Serpentes
- Family: Colubridae
- Subfamily: Ahaetuliinae; Figueroa, McKelvy, Grismer, Bell, and Lailvaux, 2016

Genera
- Ahaetulla; Chrysopelea; Dendrelaphis; Dryophiops; Proahaetulla

= Ahaetuliinae =

Ahaetuliinae Temporal range: Oligocene-Holocene, 33.63–0 Ma

Subfamily of snakes

The Ahaetuliinae are a subfamily of vine snakes within the family Colubridae that was erected in 2016. They are found from South and Southeast Asia through to Australia.

== Etymology ==
The name comes from the genus Ahaetulla, which gets its name from the Sri Lankan Sinhalese language words ahaetulla/ahata gulla/as gulla, meaning "eye plucker" or "eye picker", because of the belief that they pluck out the eyes of humans, as first reported by the Portuguese traveler João Ribeiro in 1685.

== Classification ==
Ahaetuliinae was formally named and described in 2016 by Figueroa et al., using the name proposed by Pyron et al. in 2013. Previously placed within Colubrinae, Ahaetuliinae was strongly supported as the sister group to Colubrinae in a 2016 study by Figueroa et al., as shown in the cladogram below:

- Colubridae
  - - - Sibynophiinae
      - Natricinae
    - - Pseudoxenodontinae
      - Dipsadinae
  - - - Grayiinae
      - Calamariinae
    - - Ahaetuliinae
      - Colubrinae

Ahaetuliinae is split into two separate monophyletic groups: one group consists of the sharp-nosed snakes of the generas Dryophiops, Ahaetulla, and the recently named Proahaetulla, and the second group consists of the rectangular-snouted snakes of the genera Dendrelaphis and Chrysopelea. The most recent common ancestor (and origin) of Ahaetuliinae dates back to an estimated 33.63 million years ago, from the Oligocene epoch. The subfamily diverged into the five separate genera during this time, with the latest divergence of Proahaetulla from Ahaetulla occurring an estimated 26.55 million years ago.

The phylogeny of many of the species within Ahaetuliinae can be shown in the cladogram below, with possibly paraphyletic species noted:

- Ahaetuliinae
  - sharp‑nosed snakes
    - - Ahaetulla
        - - - - - Ahaetulla prasina (paraphyletic)
                - Ahaetulla fasciolata
              - Ahaetulla prasina (paraphyletic)
            - - Ahaetulla prasina (paraphyletic)
              - Ahaetulla mycterizans
          - Ahaetulla prasina (paraphyletic)
        - - - - - Ahaetulla anomala
                - Ahaetulla pulverulenta
              - Ahaetulla nasuta (paraphyletic)
            - Ahaetulla nasuta (paraphyletic)
          - Ahaetulla fronticincta
      - Proahaetulla antiqua
    - Dryophiops
      - Dryophiops rubescens
      - Dryophiops philippina
  - broad‑nosed snakes
    - Dendrelaphis
      - - - - - Dendrelaphis marenae
              - Dendrelaphis haasi
            - Dendrelaphis pictus
          - - - Dendrelaphis ngansonensis
              - Dendrelaphis cyanochloris
            - Dendrelaphis striatus
        - Dendrelaphis formosus
      - - - - Dendrelaphis tristis
            - Dendrelaphis subocularis
          - Dendrelaphis schokari
        - - Dendrelaphis fuliginosus
          - Dendrelaphis caudolineatus
    - Chrysopelea
      - - - Chrysopelea paradisi
          - Chrysopelea ornata
        - Chrysopelea pelias
      - Chrysopelea taprobanica

== Distribution ==
Ahaetuliinae are distributed from Pakistan, through India, Sri Lanka, Nepal, and Bangladesh, throughout Southeast Asia into southeastern China, in the Philippines, the Malay Archipelago, Papua New Guinea, and northeastern Australia. Most species are found in forests.

== Description ==
Ahaetuliine snakes are arboreal and have keeled ventral and subcaudal scales (laterally notched in some species), and enlarged posterior grooved fangs (lacking in some Dendrelaphis).

Notable traits of some species include gliding in Chrysopelea, jumping behavior in Dendrelaphis, and large eyes with horizontal pupils in Ahaetulla and Dryophiops..

== List of genera ==
Ahaetuliinae comprises five genera containing 77 species (Ahaetulla [20 species], Chrysopelea [5 species], Dendrelaphis [49 species], Dryophiops [2 species] and Proahaetulla [1 species]) that are more closely related to one another than to members of the subfamily Colubrinae.

- Ahaetulla (20 species)
- Chrysopelea (5 species)
- Dendrelaphis (49 species)
- Dryophiops (2 species)
- Proahaetulla (1 species)
