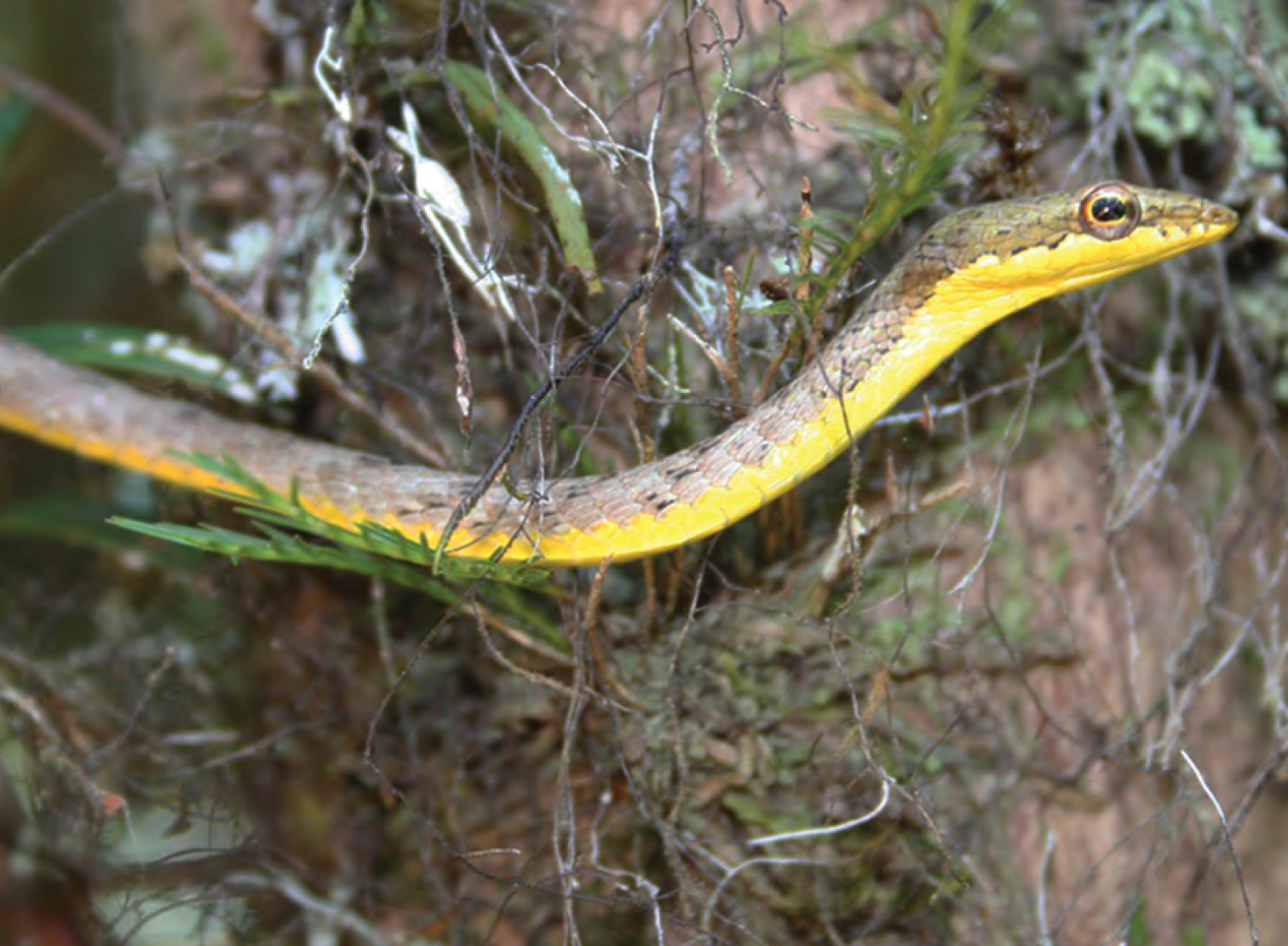
- Dryophiops philippina

Scientific classification
- Kingdom: Animalia
- Phylum: Chordata
- Class: Reptilia
- Order: Squamata
- Suborder: Serpentes
- Family: Colubridae
- Subfamily: Ahaetuliinae
- Genus: Dryophiops; Boulenger, 1896

Species
- Dryophiops philippina Boulenger, 1896; Dryophiops rubescens (Gray, 1835) (type)

= Dryophiops =

Genus of snakes

Dryophiops is a genus of whip snakes of the family Colubridae, containing two species. They are arboreal tree snakes, found in forests in Southeast Asia.

== Taxonomy ==
The genus Dryophiops contains two species: the type species Dryophiops rubescens found in mainland Southeast Asia and Indonesia, and Dryophiops philippina found in the Philippines.

Dryophiops is one of five genera belonging to the vine snake subfamily Ahaetuliinae, of which Dryophiops is most closely related to Ahaetulla and Proahaetulla, as shown in the cladogram below:

- Ahaetuliinae
  - sharp‑nosed snakes
    - - Ahaetulla
      - Proahaetulla
    - Dryophiops
      - Dryophiops rubescens
      - Dryophiops philippina
  - broad‑nosed snakes
    - Dendrelaphis
    - Chrysopelea

== Description ==
Dryophiops snakes, along with their close relatives of Ahaetulla and Proahaetulla, all share an elongated and laterally compressed body plan, with elongated sharp snouts, and large eyes with horizontals pupils specialized for binocular vision.
