= Spotted seahorse =

Spotted seahorse may refer to:

- Hippocampus kuda, a species of seahorse, native to the Indian and Pacific oceans
- Hippocampus erectus or Lined seahorse, a species of seahorse, native to the Atlantic Ocean
