= Children's Aquarium at Fair Park =

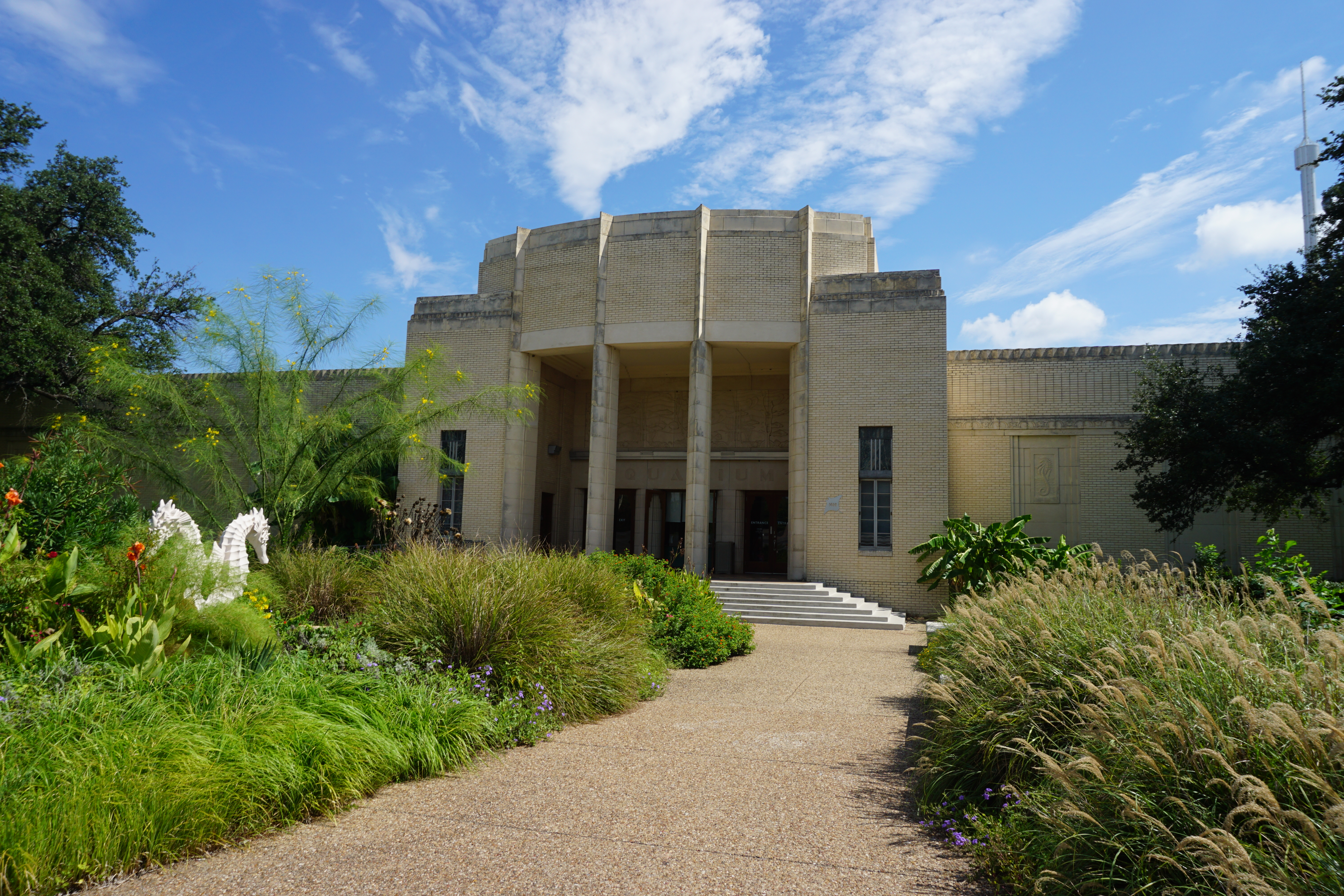
- Interactive map of Children's Aquarium at Fair Park
- 32.777°N 96.760°W
- Date opened: 1936
- Location: Dallas, Texas, US
- Major exhibits: Freshwater Zone, Intertidal Zone, Shore Zone, Near Shore Zone, Offshore Zone, Stingray Bay
- Website: www.childrensaquarium.com

The Children's Aquarium Dallas (Formally known as the Children's Aquarium at Fair Park) is an aquarium located in Fair Park, Dallas, Texas, US. It opened in 1936 as part of the Texas Centennial Exposition, becoming the first public aquarium in the state of Texas. The aquarium received an $8 million renovation in 2010. The Aquarium has six exhibit areas. During the COVID-19 pandemic, the Aquarium was closed until the ZoOceanarium Group bought the aquarium on July 23, 2021. The aquarium reopened on September 24, 2021, with new exhibits that were being planned.

== Freshwater Zone ==
The Freshwater Zone is located in the displays, red-eared sliders, a northern caiman lizard, an alligator snapping turtle, longnose gars, electric eels, an axolotl, Schneider's skink, sheltopusik, paradise flying snake, Gila trout, and various other freshwater aquatic animals.

== The Intertidal Zone ==
The Intertidal Zone is located in the center of the aquarium and features lined seahorse, upside-down jellyfish, Oriental sweetlips, archerfish, a tank of various cichlids and other various fish. As well as an interactive tank of red garra (also known as Doctor Fish)

== Shore Zone ==
Located to the left of the aquarium; The Shore Zone displays spiny lobsters, toadfish, batfish, rhinoceros iguana, clownfish, goatfish, four-eyed fish, red lionfish, big-belly seahorse, and more.

== Near Shore ==
Immediately following The Shore Zone, the Near Shore Zone displays wolf eels, whitespotted bamboo shark, laced moray, Atlantic sea nettles, Jellyfish, peacock clownfish.

== Offshore Zone ==
The Offshore Zone is located at the far left of the aquarium and features among other animals porcupinefish, blacktip sharks, laced morays, common seadragon, and swell sharks.

== Stingray Bay ==
Stingray Bay allows guests to feed and pet cownose rays, while seeing southern stingrays, zebra sharks, bonnethead sharks, and mahi-mahi. There is also a Touch Tank featuring starfish, sea urchin, and horseshoe crabs.

Guests can book birthday parties and overnight parties that include a talk with an employee that includes a live animal and preserved parts of marine animals. Guests of the party can also feed the stingrays at Stingray Bay. Many field trips also visit the aquarium. The aquarium hosts summer and winter day camps for children in grades Pre-K to 5.

== Gallery ==
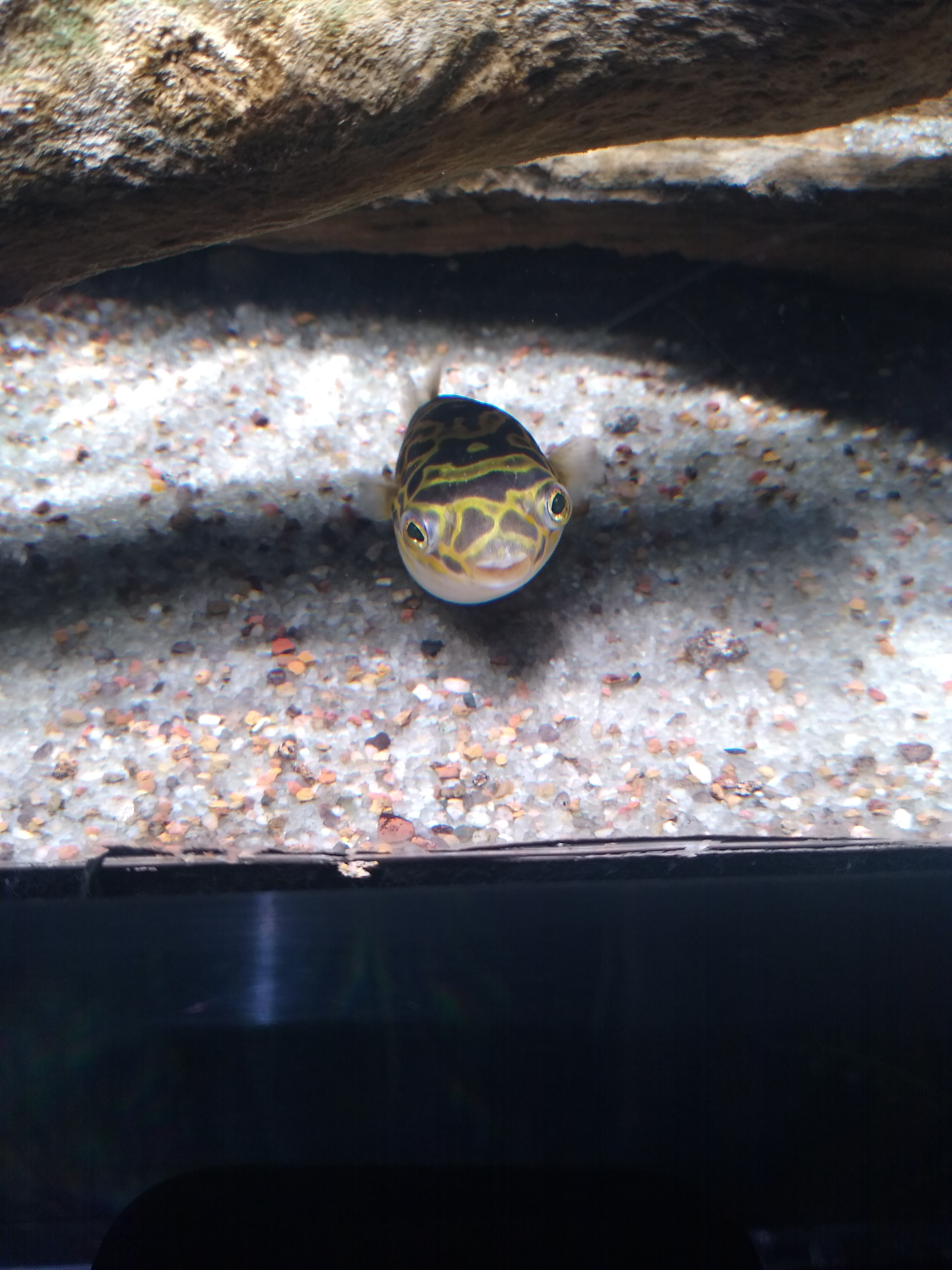
Eyespot puffer

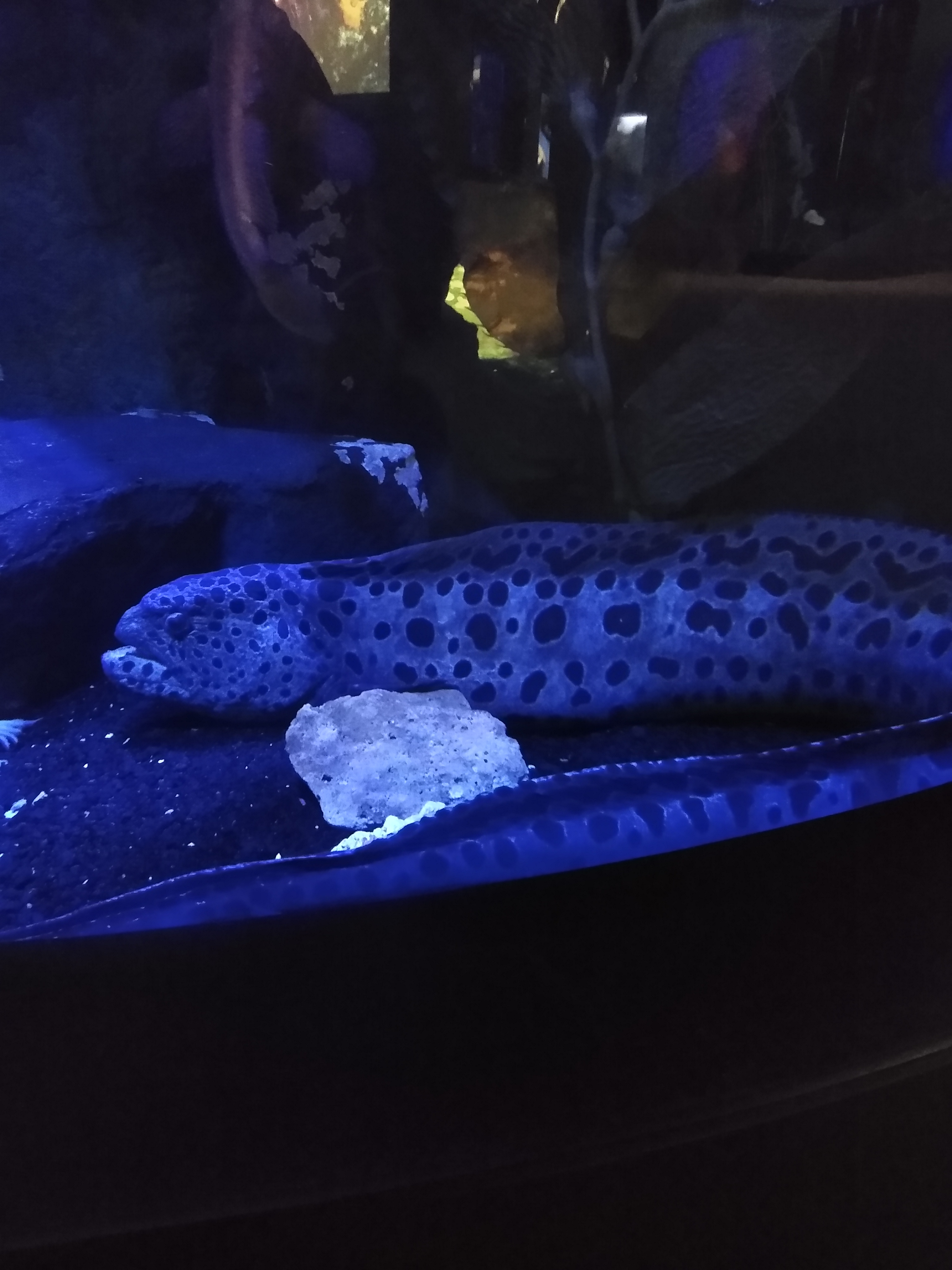
Wolf eel

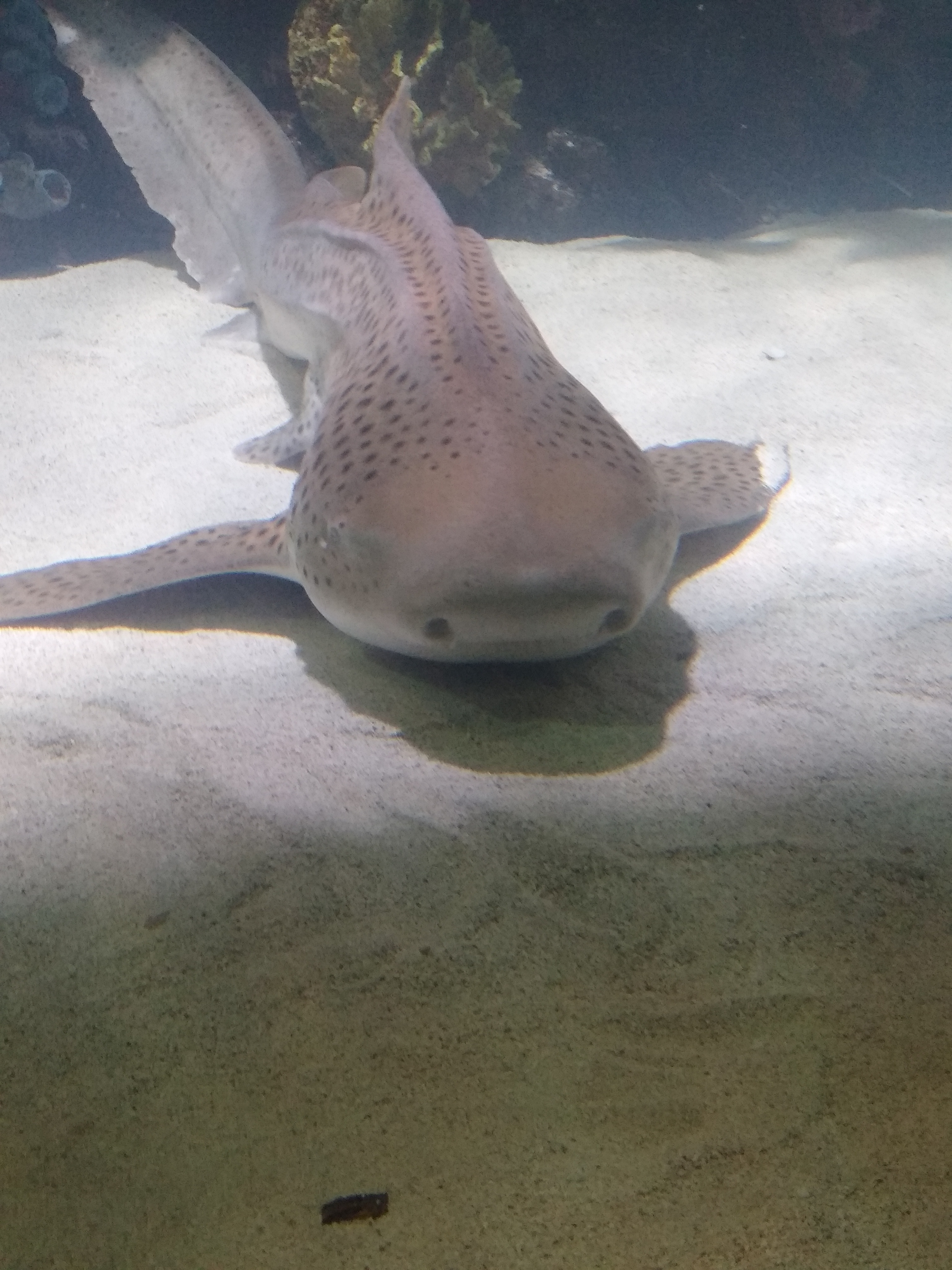
Zebra shark
