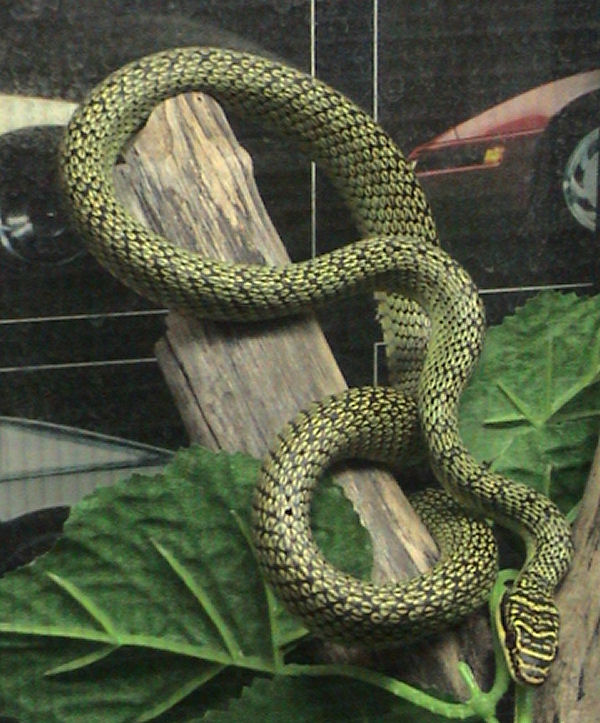

Conservation status
- Least Concern (IUCN 3.1)

Scientific classification
- Kingdom: Animalia
- Phylum: Chordata
- Class: Reptilia
- Order: Squamata
- Suborder: Serpentes
- Family: Colubridae
- Subfamily: Ahaetuliinae
- Genus: Chrysopelea
- Species: C. ornata

Binomial name
- Chrysopelea ornata (Shaw, 1802)
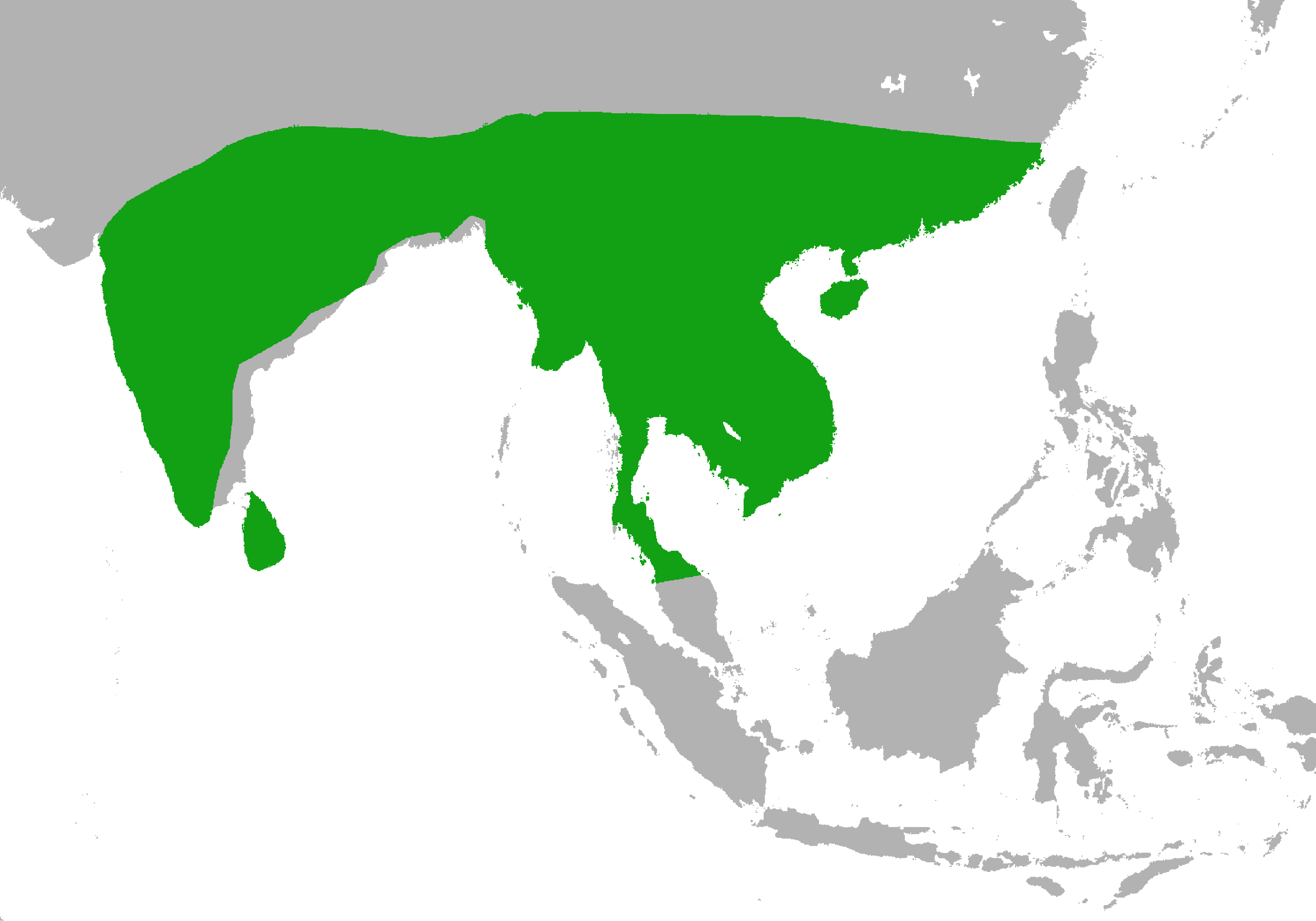

= Chrysopelea ornata =

Species of snake

Chrysopelea ornata (Thai: งูเขียวพระอินทร์) is a species of mildly venomous opisthoglyphous (rear-fanged) colubrid snake found in both South Asia and Southeast Asia. It is commonly known as the golden tree snake, ornate flying snake, and golden flying snake. Along with the other species in the genus Chrysopelea, the golden tree snake is unusual, as it is capable of a type of gliding "flight" (more of a controlled "throwing" or "falling") — mainly utilised during the pursuit of prey animals — from tree-to-tree. This action is also used to great effect for the snake to flee its own potential predators (such as birds or other reptiles). Currently, three subspecies are recognised. The snake's striking looks, and potential for gliding, have made it a coveted choice for captivity.

== Etymology ==
The species name ornata is Latin for "decorated or "ornamented", in reference to the ornate coloration.

=== Common names ===
- English: golden tree snake, gliding snake, ornate flying snake, golden flying snake, gold and black tree snake, flying tree snake
- Hindi: kala jin.
- Sinhala: pol-mal-karawala, malsara.
- German: Gelbgrüne Schmuckbaumnatter, Gewöhnliche Schmuckbaumnatter.
- Bengali: কালনাগিনী (Kaalnagini), উড়ন্ত সাপ, উড়াল মহারাজ সাপ, সুন্দরী সাপ, কালসাপ, কালনাগ
- Konkani: Naneto
- Nepali: Seerise
- Thai: งูเขียวดอกหมาก (Ngoo kee-ow dork maak)
- Khmer: ពស់តុកកែ (Pous Tok Kae)
- Malayalam: നാഗത്താൻ പാമ്പ് (nagathan pambu)

== Taxonomy ==
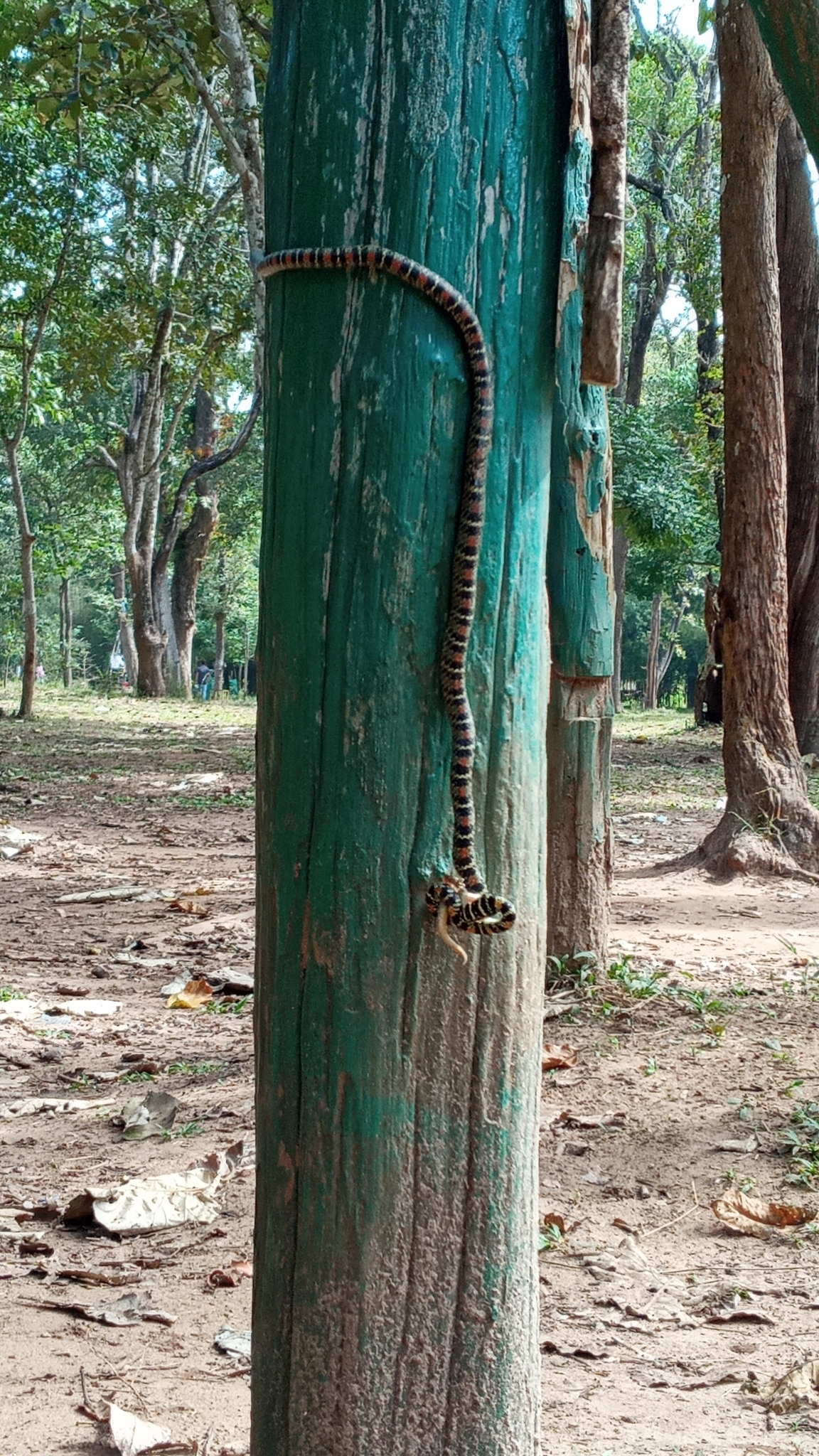
Eating a gecko, in Karnataka

Chrysopelea ornata belongs to the genus Chrysopelea, which contains four other described species.

Chrysopelea is one of five genera belonging to the vine snake subfamily Ahaetuliinae, of which Chrysopelea is most closely related to Dendrelaphis, as shown in the cladogram below:

- Ahaetuliinae
  - sharp‑nosed snakes
    - - Ahaetulla
      - Proahaetulla
    - Dryophiops
  - broad‑nosed snakes
    - Dendrelaphis
    - Chrysopelea
      - - - Chrysopelea paradisi
          - Chrysopelea ornata
        - Chrysopelea pelias
      - Chrysopelea taprobanica

=== Subspecies ===
Three subspecies of C. ornata are recognized:

- C. o. ornata (Shaw, 1802) – southwest India
- C. o. ornatissima Werner, 1925 – north and east India, Nepal, Bangladesh and Southeast Asia
- C. o. sinhaleya Deraniyagala, 1945 – Sri Lanka.

== Geographic range ==
It is found in India (North Bengal), Bangladesh, Sri Lanka, Nepal, Myanmar, Thailand, Western Malaysia, Laos, Cambodia, Vietnam, China (Hong Kong, Hainan, Yunnan), and Singapore (introduced).

In India, Chrysopelea ornata ranges from the Western Ghats, up to the Dangs, Katernia Ghat in Uttar Pradesh, North Bihar, northern West Bengal eastwards to Arunachal Pradesh. It is also found in the forests of the Andaman Islands.

== Description ==
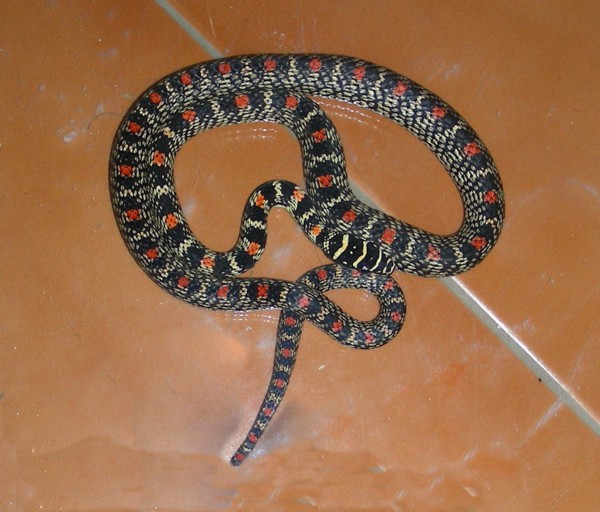
Red-spotted form of Chrysopelea ornata from North Bengal, India

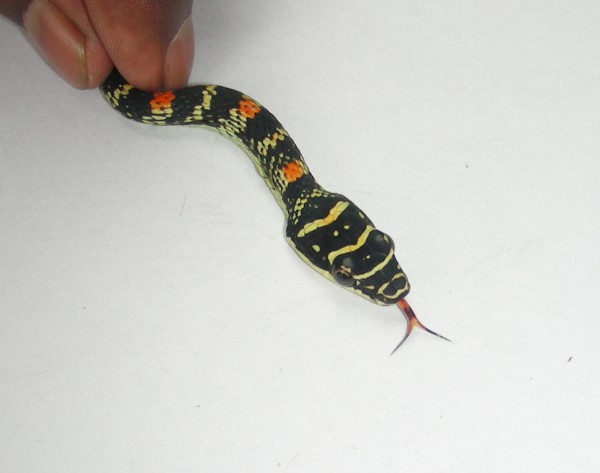
Head of C. ornata with brilliantly coloured tongue exposed

Chrysopelea ornata is usually green in color, with black cross-hatching and yellow or gold colored accents. The body, though slender, is far less so than in other tree snakes. It has a flattened head with constricted neck, a blunt nose and large eyes with round pupils.

The lateral, sharp and pronounced keeled condition of the ventrals in association with the normal, not enlarged, vertebral row of scales distinguish this snake.

This snake ranges from 11.5 to 130 cm (0.38 to 4.27 ft) long. Maturity is reached at about 1 m (3.3 ft) in length. The tail is about one-fourth of the total length.

Chrysopelea ornata has two major colour forms, and their descriptions are given below:

- In Sri Lanka and the southern extent of its Indian range, the snake is primarily greenish yellow or pale green. Each scale has a black mesial streak or spot, and is more or less edged with black. The snake also has dark crossbars at intervals. A series of large, flower-shaped, reddish or orange vertebral spots may be present or absent. Ventrals greenish, outside the keel edged with black or spotted. Head black with yellow crossbars and spots. The flower-shaped spots are more common in Sri Lanka than in south India.
- The second color variety which is more common in Southeast Asia lacks the reddish vertebral spots, and has less prominent black crossbars. But all varieties can be found throughout its distribution area.

=== Venom ===
This species is considered mildly venomous, as it is rear-fanged (opisthoglyphous). This is an adaptive feature present in many genera of snakes, such as the hognose and mangrove snakes (among others), in which two small fangs are situated closer to the rear of the mouth (on the upper jaw), as opposed to frontal-fanged (solenoglyphous) venomous snakes, which possess retractable, long, sharp fangs at the front of the mouth (which deliver quick and lethal doses of venom). Opisthoglyphy is typically indicative of an animal that consumes reptiles and/or amphibians, as it is thought that the placement of the teeth in the back of the mouth aids the snake in wrangling and controlling wriggly, slippery lizards, frogs, toads, etc. In order for the venom to be administered and the prey subdued, it must first be "chewed" into the prey, as the rear fangs are not placed immediately at the front of the mouth; by comparison, vipers and elapids (which are frontal-fanged) generally prefer avian, rodent or other mammalian prey, which they bite once before retreating, waiting for envenomation to kill the animal before consuming. The ease with which frontal-fanged snakes can deliver their deadly venom makes them medically significant and dangerous to humans and other animals; rear-fanged snakes, including the Chrysopelea species, are therefore not considered so dangerous to humans as to be of medical importance.

== Behaviour ==
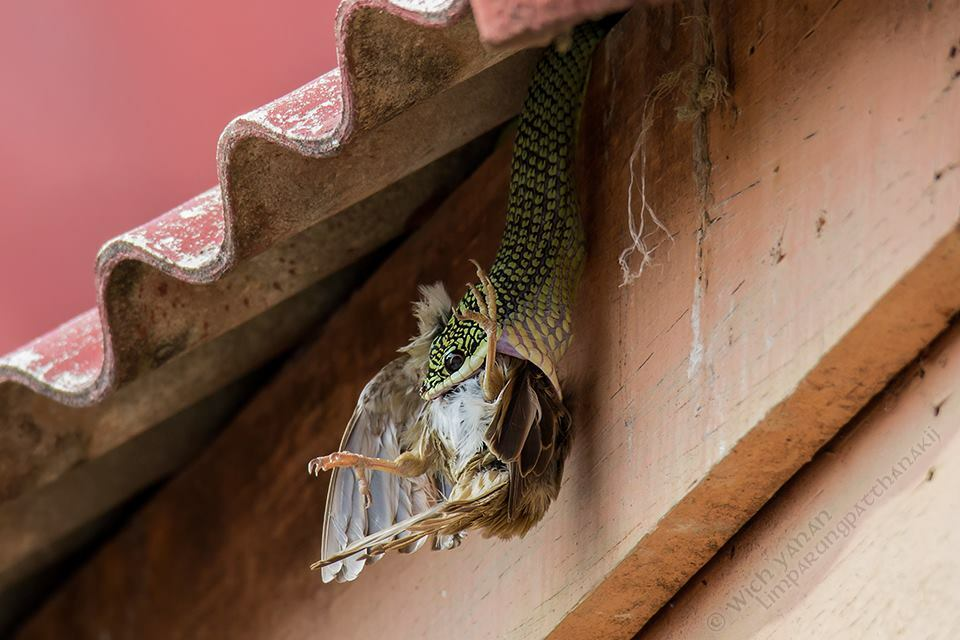
C. o. ornatissima eating a Eurasian tree sparrow

C. ornata is diurnal and arboreal. The snake's gliding ability, while not as impressive as that of the paradise flying snake (C. paradisi), still makes it capable of moving from tree to tree with relative ease. These snakes are excellent climbers, being able move across even the smallest of branches and even straight up trees with few branches by using the edges of rough bark. They are frequently seen moving up a coconut palm, or up vertical rock faces in graceful curves, gripping the somewhat uneven surfaces with their scales. They tend to be nervous, fast-moving snakes, and attempt to flee if disturbed, but generally do not hesitate to bite if handled. They are mildly venomous, but the venom is not considered to be dangerous to humans. It is intended to assist in subduing fast-moving, arboreal prey. C. ornata takes small arboreal prey, such as lizards, bats, and small rodents. It might also feed on bird eggs and insects. Also, it is reported to take snakes occasionally, and to avoid frogs, though frogs are also reported being eaten. The snake stalks or pursues the prey and seizes it by the neck, which is crushed in its strong jaws.

=== Flight ===
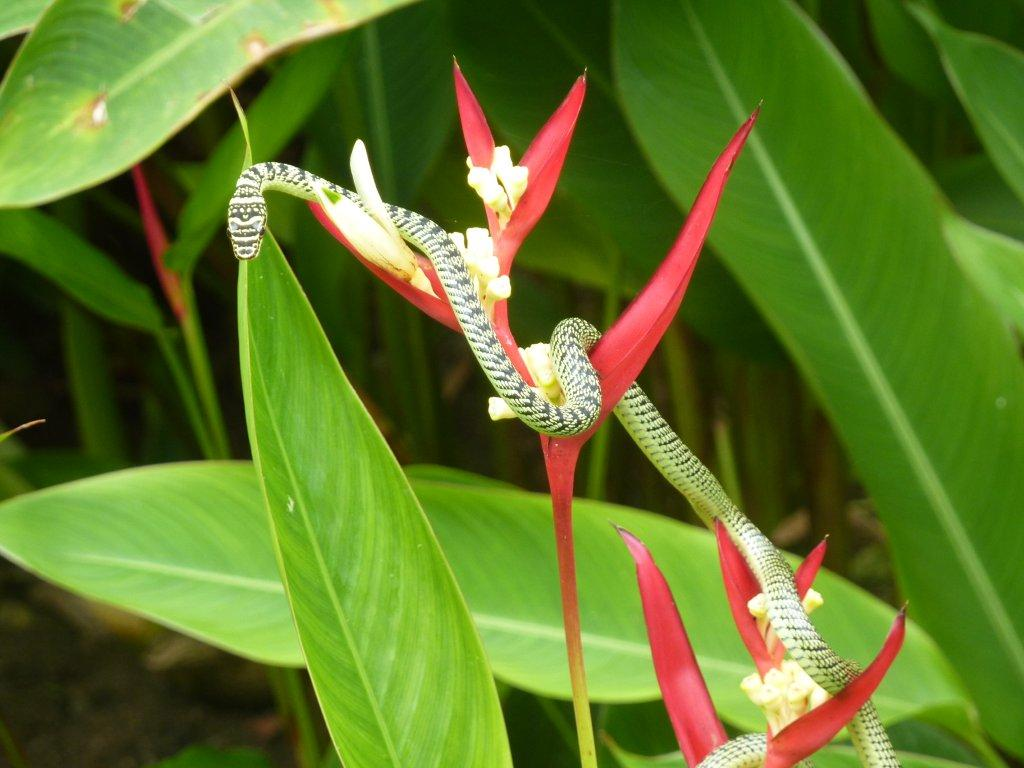
C. ornata climbing up prior to launching itself into the air

C. ornata, like others of its genus, glides or parachutes. This is presumably done to cover distances faster, to escape predators, to catch prey, or to move around in forests. Flying snakes usually parachute from tree to tree, but sometimes launch themselves from trees onto the ground. They have been known to cross as much as 100 m.

It does this by climbing up to a height, which it does easily by virtue of its keeled belly scales, and then launching itself into mid-air. The snake contracts its ventral surface inwards to form a U-shaped concave depression along the entire length of their bodies, holding the outer edges of the ventral scales rigid. This concave surface acts like a parachute, and increases air resistance, allowing the snake to glide forward with the thrust of its launch. The snake undulates through the air, in a swimming-like motion. It holds the tail rigidly upwards, and by twisting the tail from side to side, it attains balance. This motion allows it to propel forward, landing clumsily at the end of its flight.

=== Reproduction ===
Breeding habits are little known. The snake is oviparous and six to 12 elongated eggs are laid. Gravid females have been in May and June and hatchlings in June. In Bangkok, according to Smith, mating takes place in June. Hatchlings measure 114–152 mm (4 1/2 to 6 in) long, while the smallest gravid female recorded was 1,093 mm (3 ft 7 in) long.

== Conservation ==
Not known to be endangered.

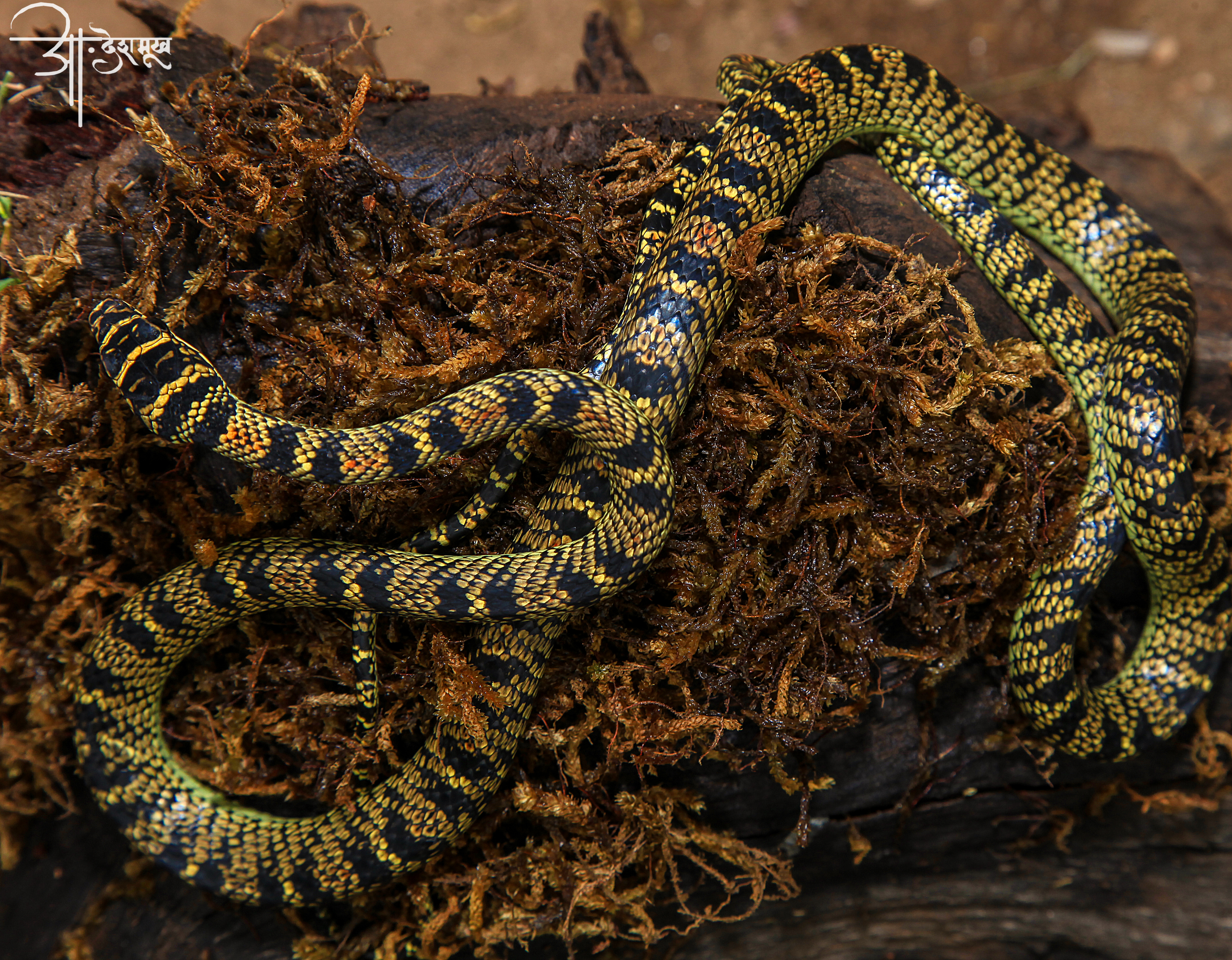
Chrysopelea ornata - The snake's striking looks and capability of gliding make it a popular choice for captivity.

== Human habitats ==
C. ornata is a common snake and has adapted well to human habitats. In southern parts of Thailand, they are reported to hide in the thatch of the roofing material inside bungalows to prey on geckos and mice during the night. In these areas, one can almost be certain to be relatively close to a C. ornata most anywhere, perhaps hiding in the crown of the nearby coconut palm, under the roots of a tree, or even curled up in a potted plant. When hunting and pursuing fleeing prey, they have been reported to drop down out of the crown of coconut palms. Snakes are often indiscriminately killed, as many locals incorrectly assume all snakes are venomous. C. ornata is sometimes cooked for food.

== In captivity ==
In recent years, ornate flying snakes have become increasingly available in the exotic pet trade; many are exported from Vietnam and neighboring countries. Instances of captive breeding are virtually unknown. Due to the species' nervous temperament and difficulty to adjusting to captivity, they tend to make poor captives for all but the most experienced reptile keepers. Many imported specimens have heavy parasite loads, and the stress of captivity all too often leads to a quick death.
