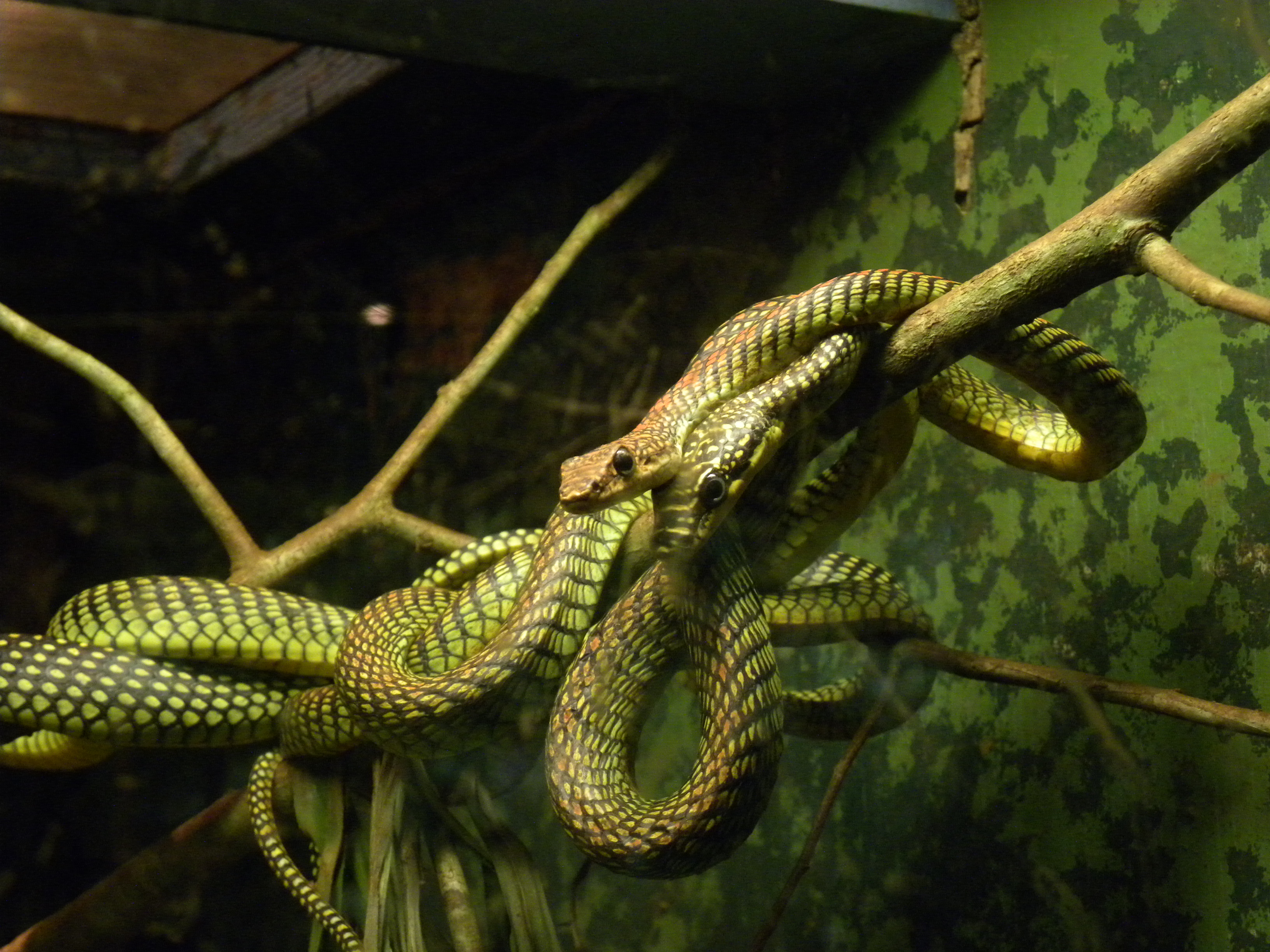

Conservation status
- Least Concern (IUCN 3.1)

Scientific classification
- Kingdom: Animalia
- Phylum: Chordata
- Class: Reptilia
- Order: Squamata
- Suborder: Serpentes
- Family: Colubridae
- Subfamily: Ahaetuliinae
- Genus: Chrysopelea
- Species: C. paradisi

Binomial name
- Chrysopelea paradisi Boie, 1827

= Chrysopelea paradisi =

Paradise flying snake

Species of snake

Paradise tree snake, paradise flying snake or garden flying snake (Chrysopelea paradisi) is a species of colubrid snake found in Southeast Asia. It can, like all species of its genus Chrysopelea, glide by stretching the body into a flattened strip using its ribs. It is mostly found in moist forests and can cover a horizontal distance of 10 meters (33 feet) or more in a glide from the top of a tree. Slow motion photography shows an undulation of the snake's body in flight while the head remains relatively stable, suggesting controlled flight. They are mildly venomous with rear fangs and also can constrict their prey, which consists of mostly lizards and bats.

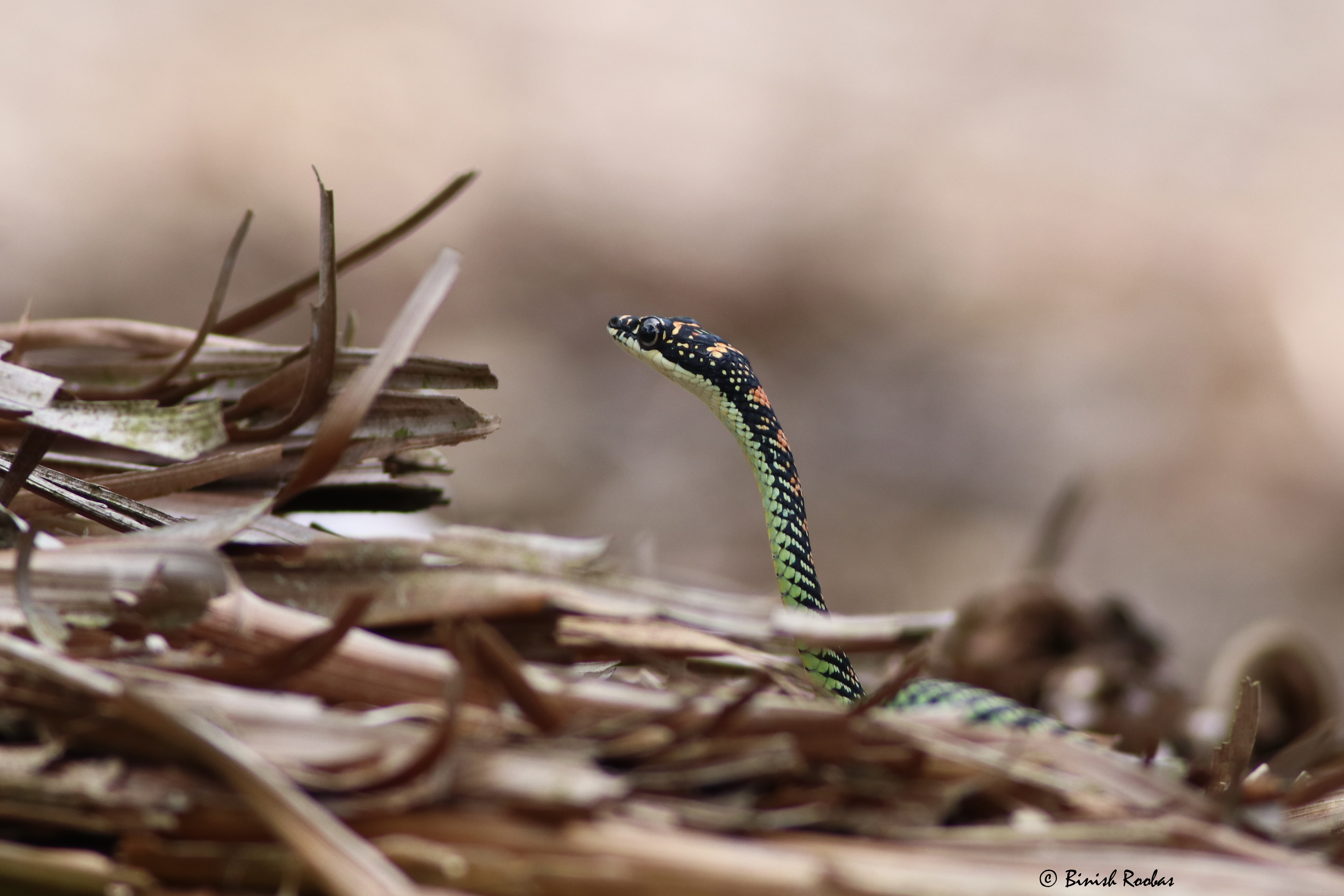
Paradise flying snake in Bukit Lawang, Indonesia

== Etymology ==
The species name paradisi comes from either the Latin "paradisus" or Greek "paradeisos", which means park. It is assumed that the holotype from 1826 was found in a park.

== Taxonomy ==
Chrysopelea paradisi belongs to the genus Chrysopelea, which contains four other described species.

Chrysopelea is one of five genera belonging to the vine snake subfamily Ahaetuliinae, of which Chrysopelea is most closely related to Dendrelaphis, as shown in the cladogram below:

- Ahaetuliinae
  - sharp‑nosed snakes
    - - Ahaetulla
      - Proahaetulla
    - Dryophiops
  - broad‑nosed snakes
    - Dendrelaphis
    - Chrysopelea
      - - - Chrysopelea paradisi
          - Chrysopelea ornata
        - Chrysopelea pelias
      - Chrysopelea taprobanica

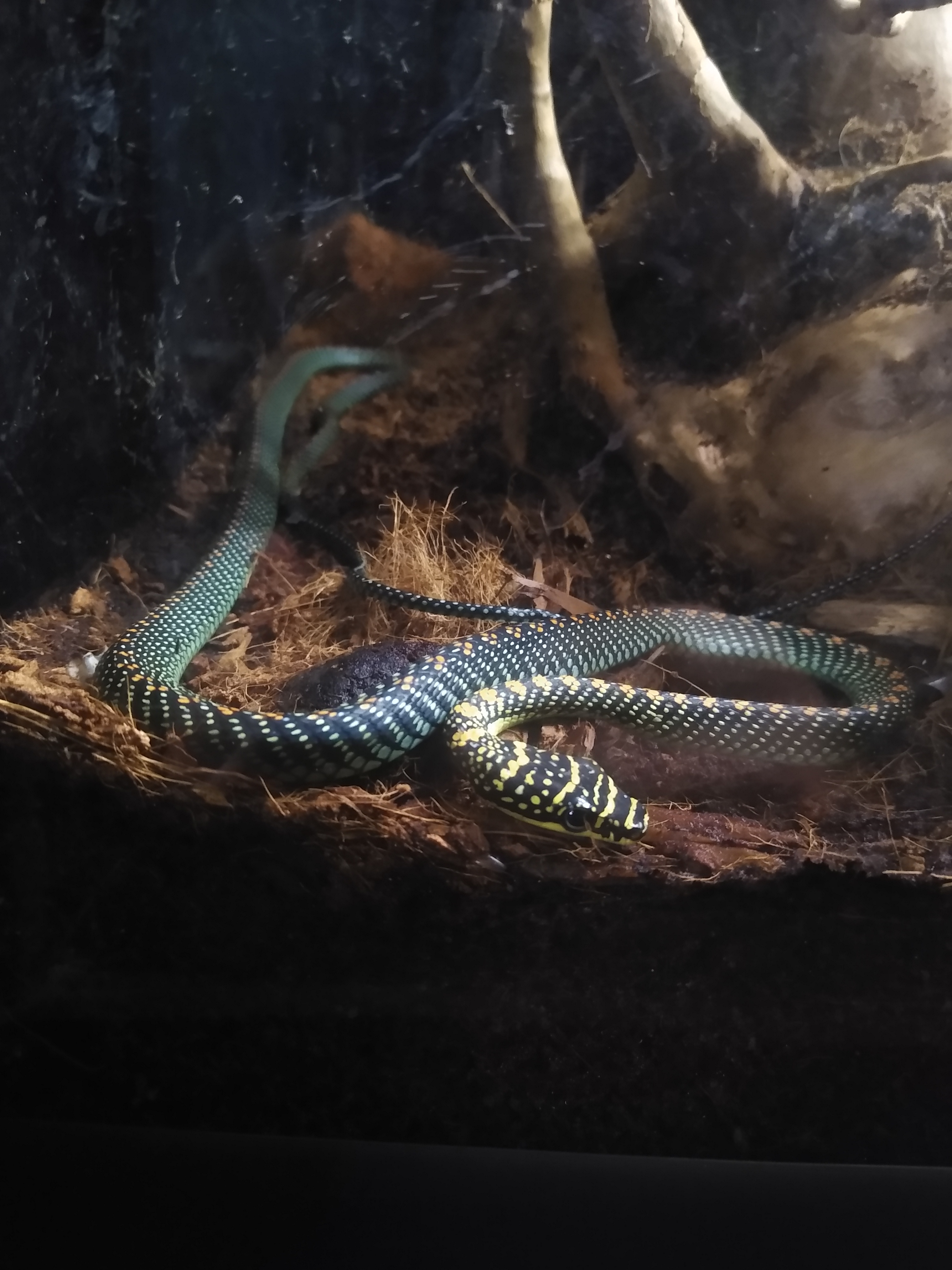
Paradise flying snake at the Children's Aquarium at Fair Park

== Distribution ==
It is found in Thailand, Indonesia, Brunei, India, Malaysia, Myanmar, Philippines, and Singapore.

== Behavior ==
It lives in forests and is fully arboreal, and glides between trees. It has oviparous reproduction.

Similar to some other colubrid snakes, flying snakes possess enlarged posterior maxillary teeth, produce venom from Duvernoy's glands, and are believed to be mildly venomous.

Because this snake is uncommon, arboreal, and prefers forests, encounters with humans are rare. However, in 2013 there was a report of a 45-year-old woman who was bitten on her right thumb by a snake hanging to the window grill when she was trying to close the windowpanes of her bedroom.

=== Gliding ===
The flying snake has a unique kinematic that is different compared to other animals with gliding or flight because they are cylindrical and do not have limbs such as legs or wings. Although the flying snake does not display visible characteristics that contribute to its ability to glide, there are three aspects that have been studied and found to have great positive effects on this. Their form of takeoff which is most commonly the anchored J-loop take-off, once airborne their cross sectional body is shaped into a triangle, and their bodies use an aerial undulation to maximize the distance traveled.
