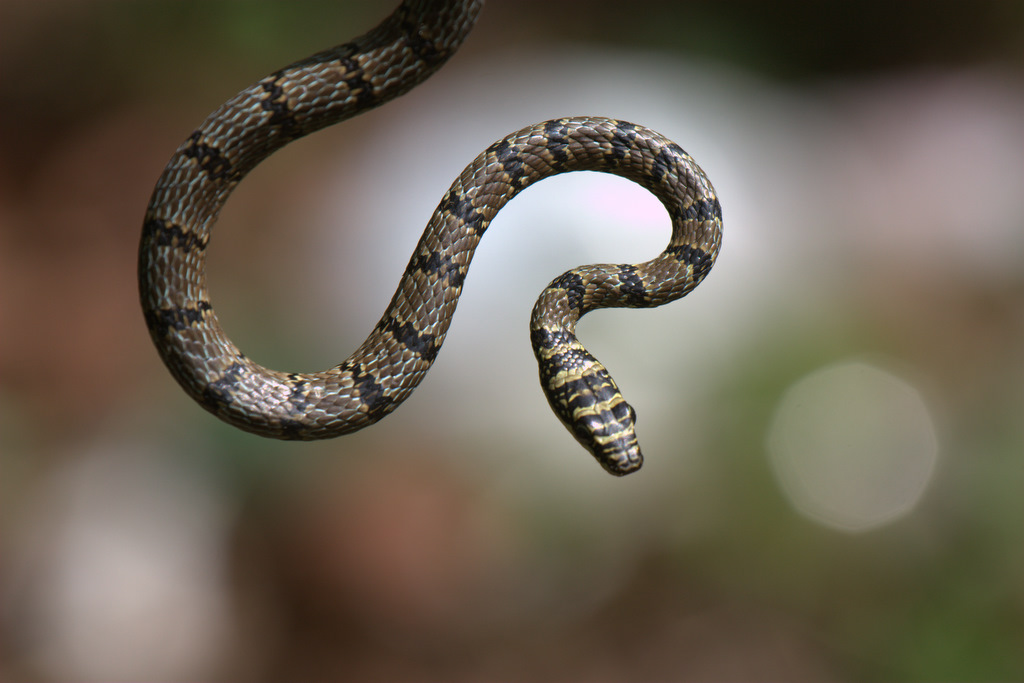
- At Kandalama, Sri Lanka

Conservation status
- Least Concern (IUCN 3.1)

Scientific classification
- Kingdom: Animalia
- Phylum: Chordata
- Class: Reptilia
- Order: Squamata
- Suborder: Serpentes
- Family: Colubridae
- Subfamily: Ahaetuliinae
- Genus: Chrysopelea
- Species: C. taprobanica

Binomial name
- Chrysopelea taprobanica Smith, 1943

= Chrysopelea taprobanica =

Species of snake

Chrysopelea taprobanica, the Sri Lankan flying snake or Indian flying snake, is a species of gliding colubrid snake distributed in India and Sri Lanka. It can glide, as with all species of its genus Chrysopelea, by stretching the body into a flattened strip using its ribs. The snake is known as "dangara dandaa - දඟරදන්ඩා" in Sinhala, due to its folding postures.

== Taxonomy ==
Chrysopelea taprobanica belongs to the genus Chrysopelea, which contains four other described species.

Chrysopelea is one of five genera belonging to the vine snake subfamily Ahaetuliinae, of which Chrysopelea is most closely related to Dendrelaphis, as shown in the cladogram below:

- Ahaetuliinae
  - sharp‑nosed snakes
    - - Ahaetulla
      - Proahaetulla
    - Dryophiops
  - broad‑nosed snakes
    - Dendrelaphis
    - Chrysopelea
      - - - Chrysopelea paradisi
          - Chrysopelea ornata
        - Chrysopelea pelias
      - Chrysopelea taprobanica

== Distribution ==
The Sri Lankan flying snake is distributed in Sri Lanka and Peninsular India. population in Sri Lanka can be found in dry zone lowlands and parts of the intermediate climatic zones, including Polonnaruwa, Wilpattu National Park, Sigiriya, Kurunegala, Jaffna, Trincomalee, and Monaragala. This species was believed to be endemic to Sri Lanka until researchers recorded a few specimens from Andhra Pradesh (India) and found old museum specimens collected from India that are now assigned to this species. More recently this species has been sighted in parts of Eastern Ghats in Tamil Nadu.

== Description ==
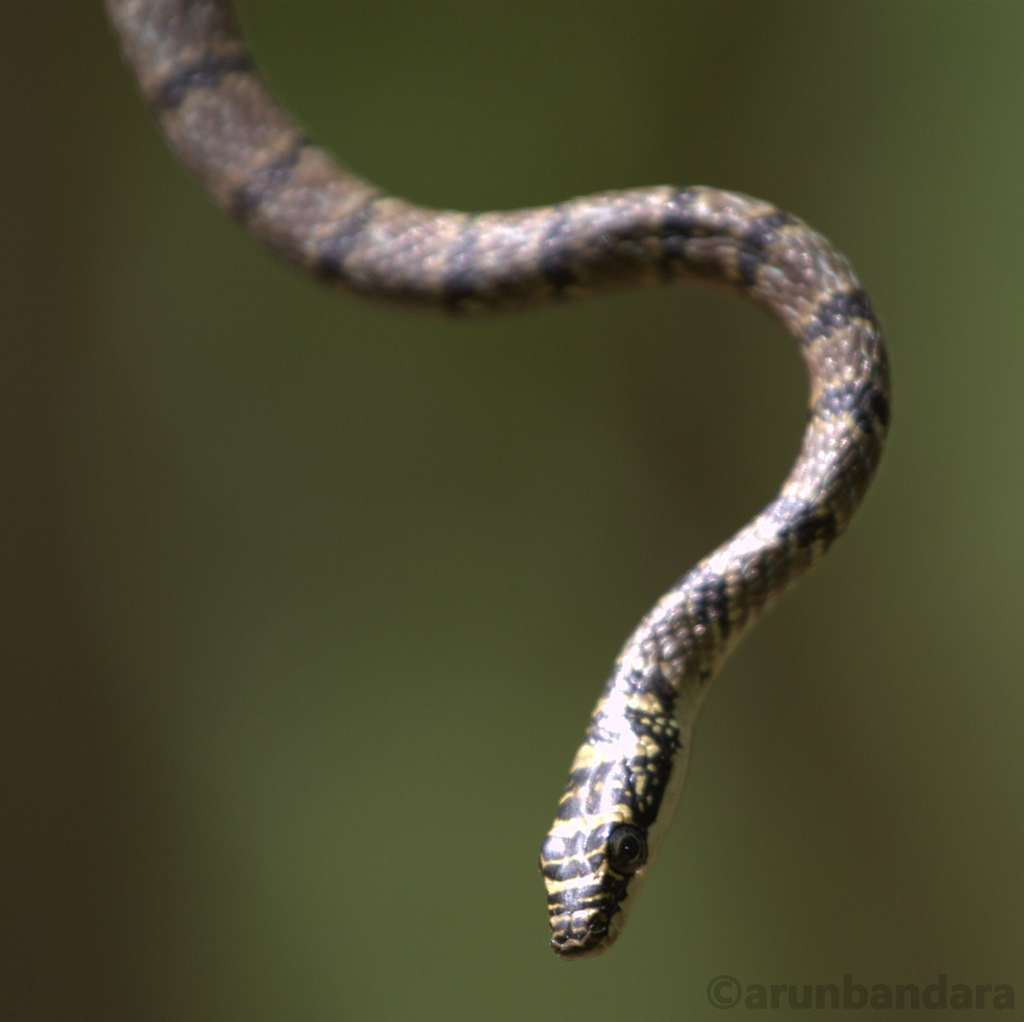
Chrysopelea taprobanica at Kandalama, Sri Lanka

Chrysopelea taprobanica is a medium-sized snake, reaching 60–90 cm (24–35 in) length. The head is depressed. Eyes are large with round pupils. Ventral scales have keels laterally. Vertebral scales are not enlarged. Dorsal scales are smooth or feebly keeled. Dorsal side is greenish yellow or pale green. Orange to red spots can be seen between dark cross bands. Head is black dorsally with yellow and black cross-bars. Ventral side is pale green with a series of black lateral spots on each side.

=== Scalation ===
There are 198–214 ventral scales and 107–123 subcaudal scales.

== Behavior ==
=== Ecology ===
The snake inhabits old growth trees, as well as secondary vegetation, cultivation, sometimes entering human dwellings. They are diurnal and arboreal.

=== Diet ===
Its diet consists mainly of lizards, such as geckos and agamids. Bats, rodents, birds and other small snakes may also be taken.

=== Reproduction ===
Chrysopelea taprobanica is oviparous.

=== Relationship with humans ===
Because this species is uncommon, arboreal, and prefers forests, it is rarely encountered by humans. One bite has been reliably documented, resulting in mild local effects only.
