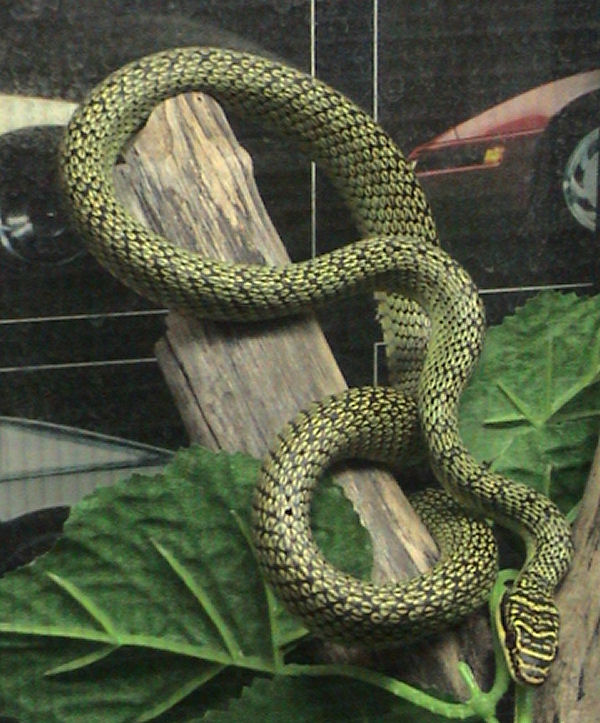
- Ornate flying snake, Chrysopelea ornata

Scientific classification
- Kingdom: Animalia
- Phylum: Chordata
- Class: Reptilia
- Order: Squamata
- Suborder: Serpentes
- Family: Colubridae
- Subfamily: Ahaetuliinae
- Genus: Chrysopelea; Boie, 1826

Type species
- Chrysopelea ornata

Species
- Chrysopelea ornata; Chrysopelea paradisi; Chrysopelea pelias; Chrysopelea rhodopleuron; Chrysopelea taprobanica

= Chrysopelea =

Genus of snakes

Chrysopelea is a genus of snakes, commonly known as flying snakes or gliding snakes, that belong to the family Colubridae. Chrysopelea species are found in Southeast Asia, and are known for their ability to glide between trees. Flying snakes are mildly venomous, though the venom is dangerous only to their small prey. There are five species within the genus.

== Gliding ==
Chrysopelea climbs using ridge scales along its underside, pushing against the rough bark of tree trunks, allowing it to move vertically up a tree. Upon reaching the end of a branch, the snake continues moving until its tail dangles from the end of the branch. It then makes a J-shape bend, leans forward to select the level of inclination it wishes to use to control its glide path, and selects a desired landing area. Once it decides on a destination, it propels itself by thrusting its body up and away from the tree, sucking in its abdomen and flaring out its ribs to turn its body into a "pseudo concave wing", all the while making a continual serpentine motion of lateral undulation parallel to the ground to stabilise its direction in midair and land safely.

The combination of forming a C-shape, flattening its abdomen and making a motion of lateral undulation in the air makes it possible for the snake to glide in the air, where it also manages to save energy compared to travel on the ground and avoid earth-bound predators. The concave wing that the snake creates in flattening itself nearly doubles the width of its body from the back of the head to the anal vent, causing the cross section of the snake's body to resemble the cross section of a frisbee or flying disc. When a flying disc spins in the air, the designed cross sectional concavity causes increased air pressure under the centre of the disc, causing lift for the disc to fly, and the snake continuously moves in lateral undulation to create the same effect of increased air pressure underneath its arched body to glide.

Flying snakes can glide on par with gliding animals, such as flying squirrels, despite the lack of limbs, wings, or any other wing-like projections. They can glide as far as 100 meters through the forests and jungles they inhabit. The snakes' destination is mostly predicted by ballistics; however, they can exercise some in-flight attitude control by "slithering" in the air.

Their ability to glide has been an object of interest for physicists and the United States Department of Defense in recent years, and studies continue to be made on what other, more subtle, factors contribute to their gliding. According to recent research conducted by the University of Chicago, scientists discovered a negative correlation between size and gliding ability, in which smaller flying snakes were able to glide longer distances horizontally.

According to research performed by Professor Jake Socha at Virginia Tech, these snakes can change the shape of their body to produce aerodynamic forces and assist them in gliding. Scientists are hopeful that this research will lead to the design of robots that can glide in the air from one place to another.

== Distribution ==
Their range is in Southeast Asia (the mainland (Vietnam, Cambodia, Thailand, Myanmar, Malaysia, Singapore and Laos), Indonesia, and the Philippines), southernmost China, India, and Sri Lanka.

== Diet ==
Chrysopelea are diurnal, which means they hunt during the day. Their diets are variable depending on their range, but they are known to eat lizards, rodents, frogs, birds, and bats. They are mildly venomous snakes, but their tiny, fixed rear fangs make them dangerous only to their small prey.

== Venom ==
The genus is considered mildly venomous, with a few confirmed cases of medically significant envenomation. Chrysopelea species are not included in lists of snakes considered venomous to people.

== Taxonomy ==
Chrysopelea is one of five genera belonging to the vine snake subfamily Ahaetuliinae, of which Chrysopelea is most closely related to Dendrelaphis, as shown in the cladogram below:

- Ahaetuliinae
  - sharp‑nosed snakes
    - - Ahaetulla
      - Proahaetulla
    - Dryophiops
  - broad‑nosed snakes
    - Dendrelaphis
    - Chrysopelea
      - - - Chrysopelea paradisi
          - Chrysopelea ornata
        - Chrysopelea pelias
      - Chrysopelea taprobanica

=== Species ===
There are five recognized species of flying snake, found from western India to the Indonesian archipelago. Knowledge of their behavior in the wild is limited, but they are thought to be highly arboreal, rarely descending from the canopy. The smallest species reach about 2 feet (0.6 m) in length and the largest grow to 4 feet (1.2 m).

Image	Scientific name	Common name	Description	Distribution
	Chrysopelea ornata (Shaw, 1802)	Golden tree snake or ornate flying snake	This is the largest species of flying snake, reaching up to four feet in length. Though it is called the golden tree snake, there are other colour variations; for example, some phases tend to lean towards lime green in colour rather than pure yellow, while in India, it has orange to red markings and small black bars on the dorsum, almost as rich in colouration as the paradise tree snake. Due to their size, their gliding ability is considered weak.	South and Southeast Asia
	Chrysopelea paradisi (Boie and Boie, 1827)	Paradise tree snake	This flying snake species reaches up to three feet in length and is popular in the European pet trade. Their bodies are black, but covered in rich green scales. Clusters of red, orange, and yellow-coloured scales in the shape of flower petals line the dorsal area from the base of the neck to the tail. This is the most well known colouration, but some specimens may exhibit fully green colouration without any bright dorsal markings. Their gliding ability is considered one of the best among the flying snakes.	Southeastern Asia
	Chrysopelea pelias (Linnaeus, 1758)	Twin-barred tree snake or banded flying snake	This is the smallest flying snake species, reaching up to two feet in length. Its base colour is black or dark grey, and the entire body is covered with thick red and thin yellow with black bands. They also have cream-coloured ventrolateral lines, while the ventrals are pale green. While it is tiny, it is undoubtedly one of the rarest flying snake species within its range. Although it is able to move horizontally through the air when gliding, it does not glide as well as C. paradisi.	Southeast Asia
	Chrysopelea rhodopleuron (Boie, 1827)	Moluccan flying snake		Ambon and Sulawesi in Indonesia
	Chrysopelea taprobanica (Smith, 1943)	Sri Lankan flying snake		Sri Lanka, Peninsular India
