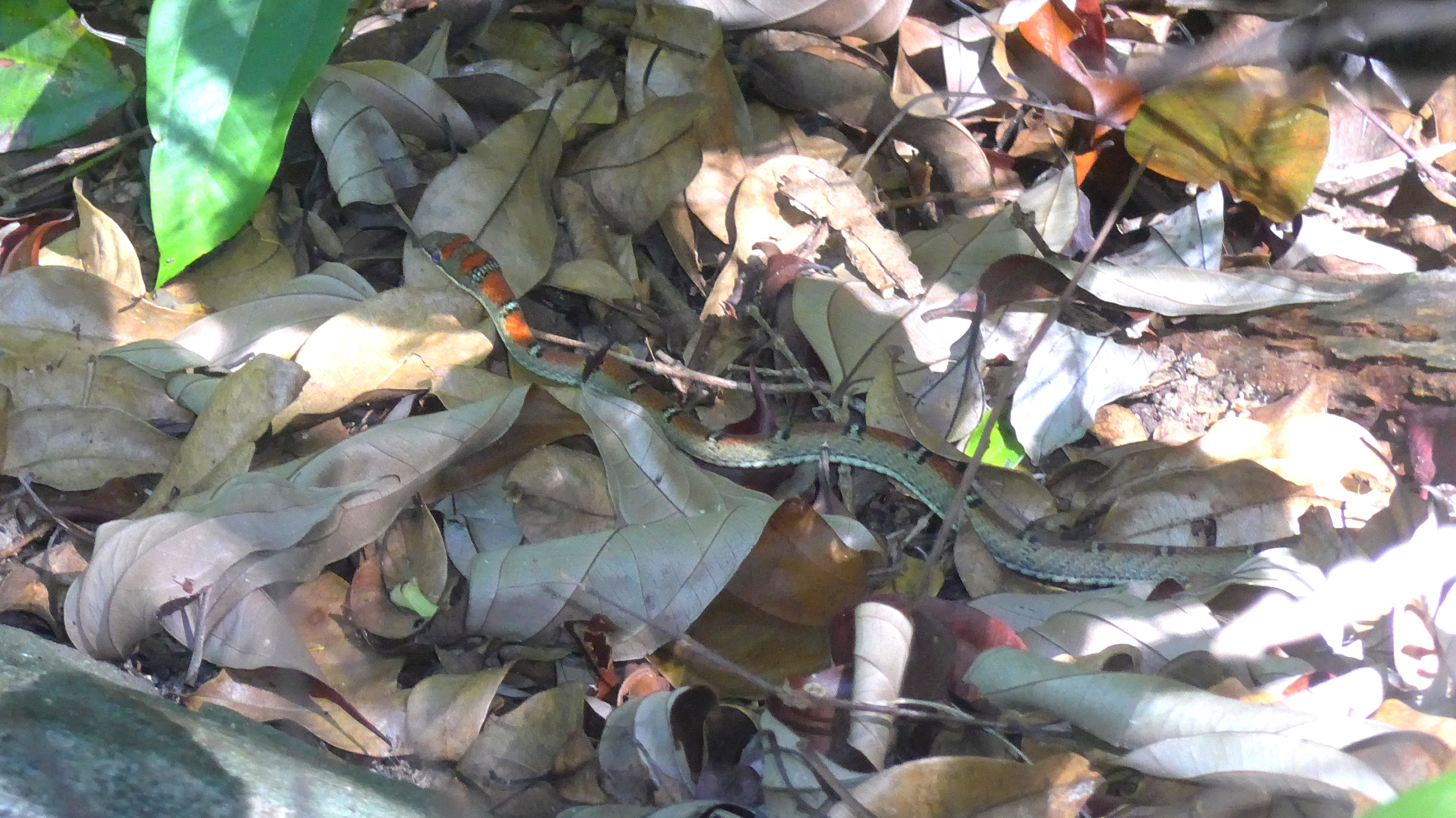

Conservation status
- Least Concern (IUCN 3.1)

Scientific classification
- Kingdom: Animalia
- Phylum: Chordata
- Class: Reptilia
- Order: Squamata
- Suborder: Serpentes
- Family: Colubridae
- Subfamily: Ahaetuliinae
- Genus: Chrysopelea
- Species: C. pelias

Binomial name
- Chrysopelea pelias (Linnaeus, 1758)
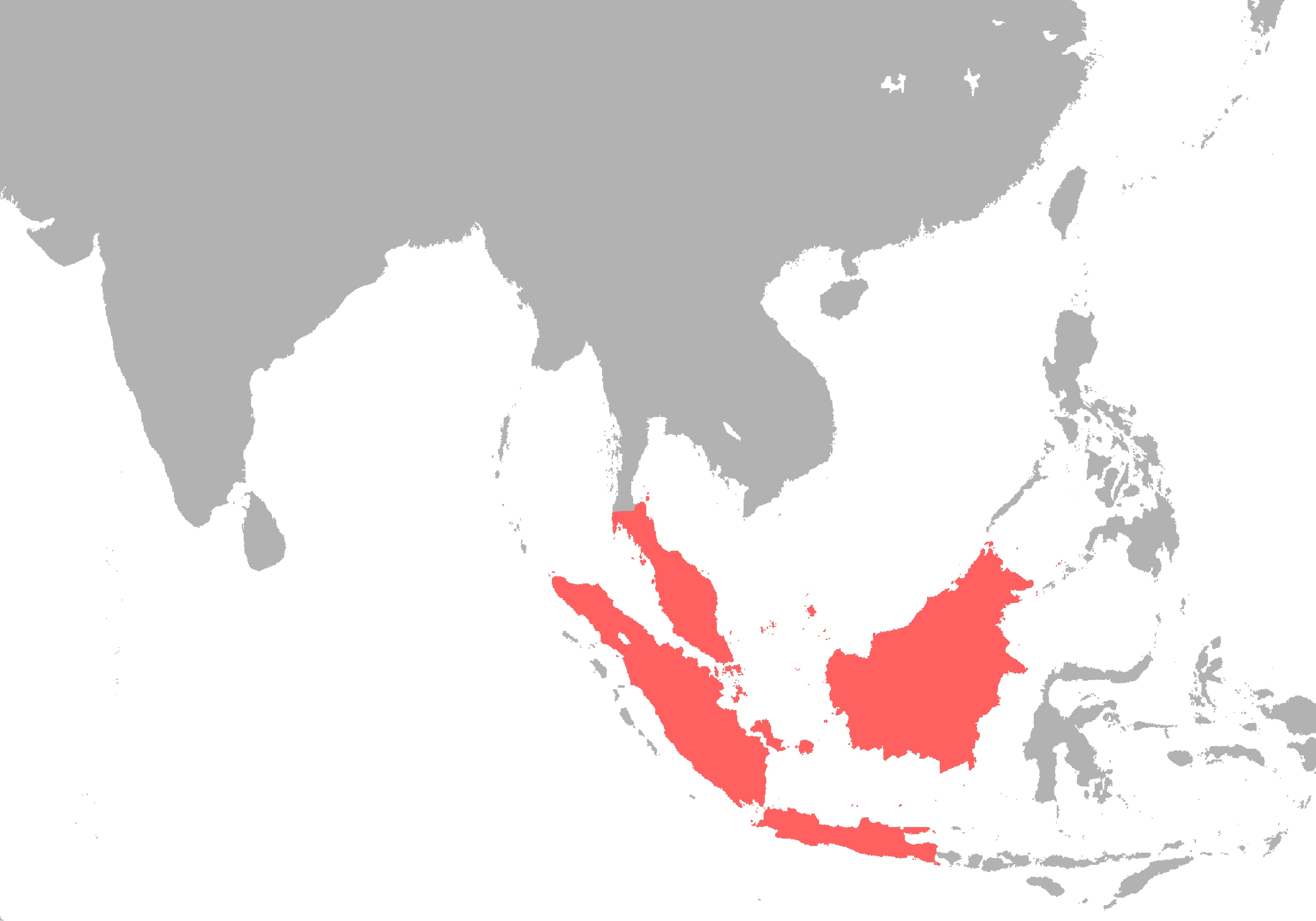

= Banded flying snake =

Twin-barred tree snake

Species of snake

The twin-barred tree snake (Chrysopelea pelias) is a species of colubrid snake found in Southeast Asia. It is also called the banded flying snake. It can glide, as with all species of its genus Chrysopelea, by stretching the body into a flattened strip using its ribs. It is fully arboreal, mostly found in moist forests, and can cover a horizontal distance of about 100 metres in a glide from the top of a tree. It is an oviparous snake.

== Taxonomy ==
Chrysopelea pelias belongs to the genus Chrysopelea, which contains four other described species.

Chrysopelea is one of five genera belonging to the vine snake subfamily Ahaetuliinae, of which Chrysopelea is most closely related to Dendrelaphis, as shown in the cladogram below:

- Ahaetuliinae
  - sharp‑nosed snakes
    - - Ahaetulla
      - Proahaetulla
    - Dryophiops
  - broad‑nosed snakes
    - Dendrelaphis
    - Chrysopelea
      - - - Chrysopelea paradisi
          - Chrysopelea ornata
        - Chrysopelea pelias
      - Chrysopelea taprobanica

== Distribution ==
It is found in Indonesia, Malaysia, Brunei, Singapore, Thailand, and Myanmar. It was erroneously reported in India.

Chrysopelea pelias has an overlapping range with the paradise tree snake (Chrysopelea paradisi) in Malaysia, Singapore, Borneo and Indonesia. However, Chrysopelea pelias is not nearly as common as the paradise tree snake.

== Gliding ==
Chrysopelea pelias begins gliding by jumping in an upward position that seems to be different from the behavior of other limbless vertebrates. This way of moving, as seen in a closely related genus, might have been a behavioral precursor to the evolution of gliding in snakes.
