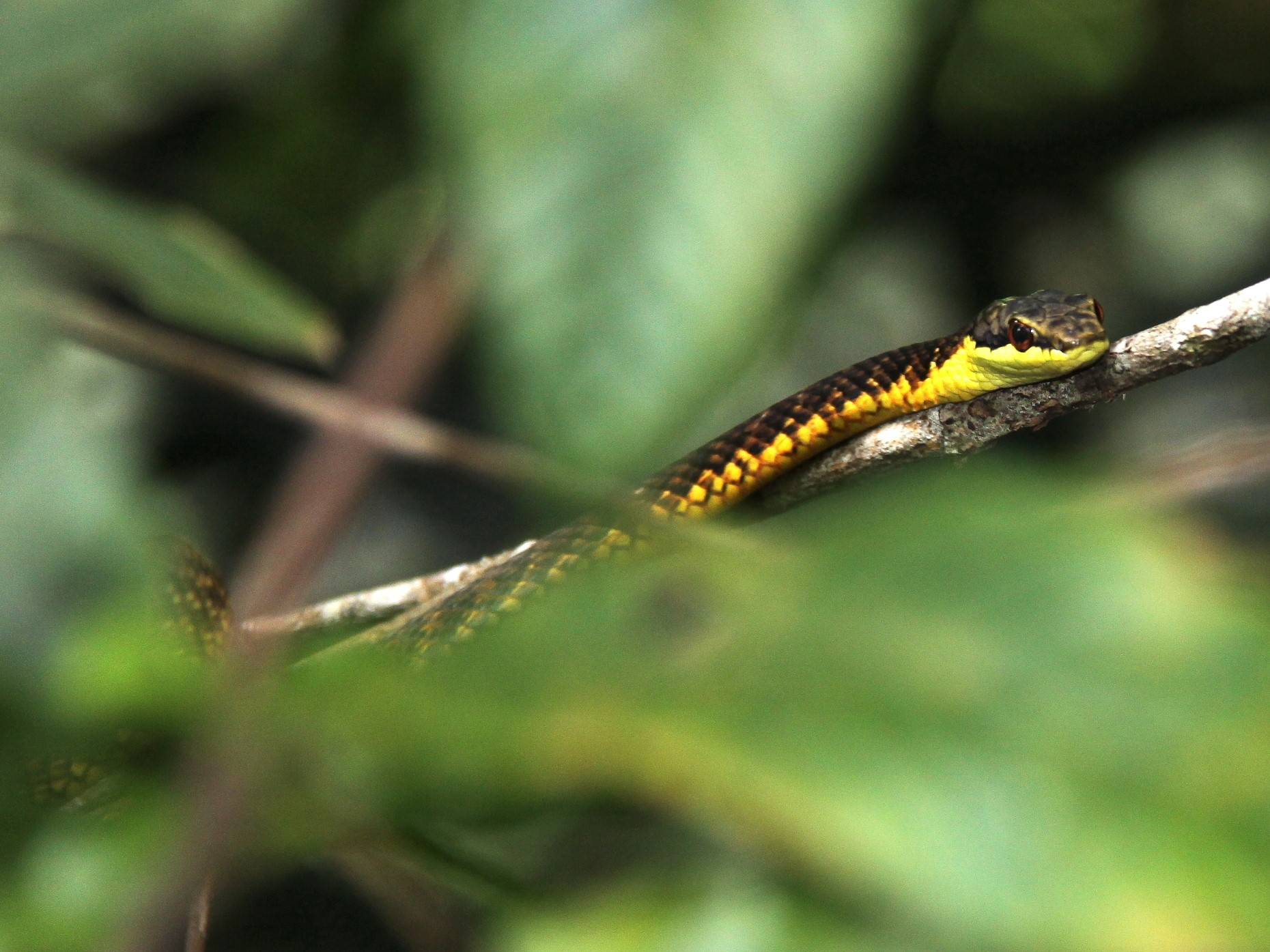

Conservation status
- Least Concern (IUCN 3.1)

Scientific classification
- Kingdom: Animalia
- Phylum: Chordata
- Class: Reptilia
- Order: Squamata
- Suborder: Serpentes
- Family: Colubridae
- Subfamily: Ahaetuliinae
- Genus: Chrysopelea
- Species: C. rhodopleuron

Binomial name
- Chrysopelea rhodopleuron Boie, 1827

Synonyms
- Chrysopelea viridis Fischer, 1880

= Chrysopelea rhodopleuron =

Species of snake

Chrysopelea rhodopleuron, commonly known as the Moluccan flying snake, is a species of gliding snake of the family Colubridae.

== Distribution ==
The snake is endemic to the Indonesian islands of Ambon and Sulawesi.

== Subspecies ==
- Chrysopelea rhodopleuron rhodopleuron Boie, 1827
- Chrysopelea rhodopleuron viridis Fischer, 1880
