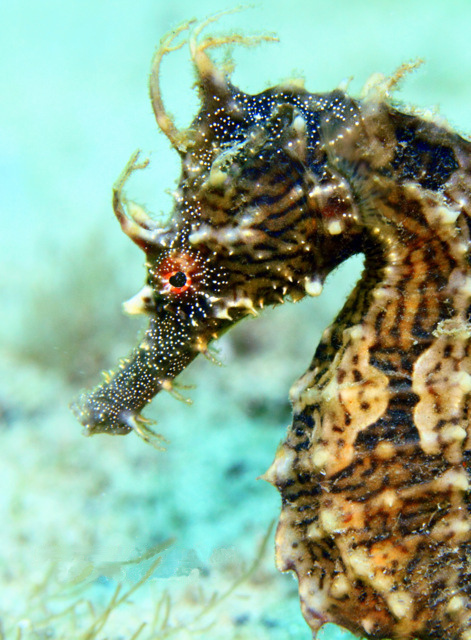

Conservation status
- Vulnerable (IUCN 3.1)
- CITES Appendix II

Scientific classification
- Kingdom: Animalia
- Phylum: Chordata
- Class: Actinopterygii
- Order: Syngnathiformes
- Family: Syngnathidae
- Genus: Hippocampus
- Species: H. erectus

Binomial name
- Hippocampus erectus Perry, 1810

Synonyms
- Hippocampus fascicularis Kaup, 1856; Hippocampus laevicaudatus Kaup, 1856; Hippocampus marginalis Kaup, 1856; Hippocampus brunneus [Bean, 1906; Hippocampus hudsonius DeKay, 1842; Hippocampus kincaidi Townsend and Barbour, 1906; Hippocampus punctulatus Guichenot, 1853; Hippocampus stylifer Jordan and Gilbert, 1882; Hippocampus tetragonus (Mitchill, 1814); Hippocampus villosus Günther, 1880; Syngnathus tetragonus Mitchill, 1814; Syngnathus caballus Larrañaga, 1923

= Lined seahorse =

Species of fish

The lined seahorse (Hippocampus erectus), northern seahorse or spotted seahorse, is a species of fish that belongs to the family Syngnathidae. H. erectus is a diurnal species with an approximate length of 15 cm (5.9 inches) and lifespan of one to four years. The H. erectus species can be found in myriad colors, from greys and blacks to reds, greens, and oranges. The lined seahorse lives in the western Atlantic Ocean as far north as Cape Cod and as far south as the Caribbean, Mexico, and Venezuela. It swims in an erect position and uses its dorsal and pectoral fins for guidance while swimming.

Lined seahorses feed mainly on minute crustaceans and brine shrimp, which they suck in through their snout. They are able to suck their prey by creating a current of water leading directly into its snout. Since seahorses are weak swimmers, they must ambush their prey by blending into their surroundings, which they do rather easily. The lined seahorse's eyes can move independently of one another, allowing it to effectively scan its surroundings. The species is sexually dimorphic and it is easy to distinguish between a male and female lined seahorse. The males are larger and also have longer tails. The lined seahorse is monogamous and performs ritual dances every morning to reestablish the bond with its mate. In addition, they create clicking sounds while embracing their partner. This action occurs when they initially find their mate. The intensity of their bond is also conveyed in how they handle the death of their partner: If either the male or female should die, the mate does not automatically replace the deceased mate with a new one. Often, it fails to find a new mate in its short lifespan.

Like with other seahorses, the male lined seahorse is the caregiver. During intercourse, the female sprays her eggs into the male's brood pouch where the eggs will incubate for 20–21 days. When the juveniles are ready to hatch, the male attaches its tail to a stationary structure and begins to arch its back, back and forth, releasing the juveniles into the water column. The juveniles are approximately 11 mm at birth. They quickly begin to learn and mimic the behavior of its parent. Courtship between the male and female parents begins immediately after birth.

The habitat of the lined seahorse is diminishing due to coastal growth and pollution, which ultimately is the cause of the decreasing population. The lined seahorse is also used as Chinese medicine and is common in the aquarium trade, contributing to its "vulnerable" status.

== Description ==
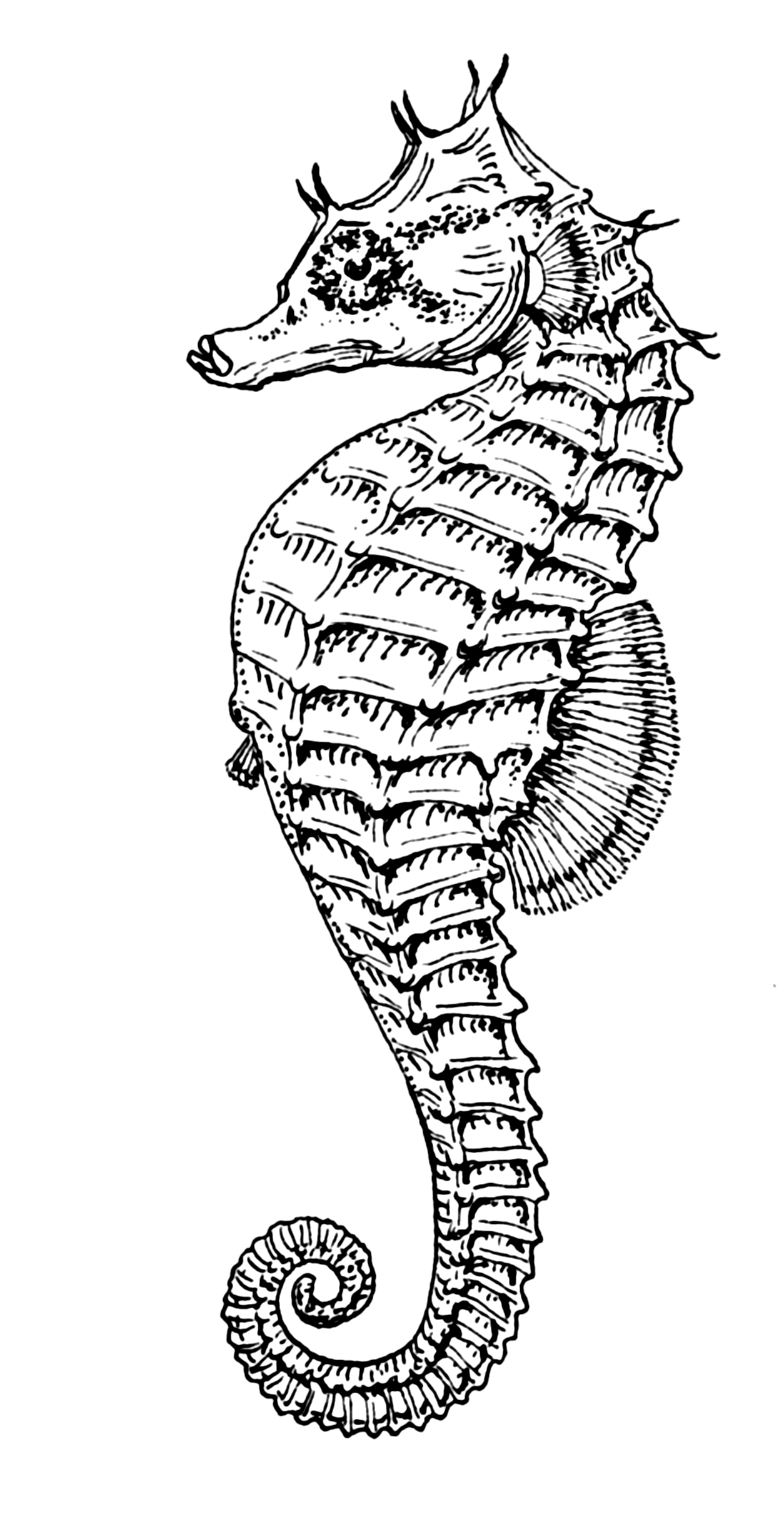
This image shows the bony structure of the lined seahorse.

The lined seahorse was first named Hippocampus Erectus by George Perry in 1810. "Hippocampus" translates into "horse or sea monster" in ancient Greek. The lined seahorse is a diurnal species that ranges in length from 12 cm to 17 cm; the maximum length reported for the species is 19 cm. The seahorse is sexually dimorphic, meaning there are distinct differences in appearances of males and females; most notably the brood pouch located on the male's abdomen which it utilized in reproduction. Males are also slightly larger in size and have longer prehensile tails than the females. In the wild, the lined seahorse has a lifespan of one to four years; however, in captivity their lifespan usually reaches the full four years. Four years is the maximum age reported for the species. They have a broad color spectrum, ranging from black, grey, brown, and green, to orange, red, and yellow. They tend to be paler on their front side. However, their colors change due to altercations in their environment, diet, anxiety or stress level, and/or mood. The lined seahorse is brawny and upright in appearance. They have an armor-like body composed of approximately fifty bony plates. Together these bony plates form the outer skeleton of the species. It is common for the species to have white lines outlining the neck area—hence its common name, "lined seahorse"—and for tiny white dots to be present on the tail. The prehensile tail consists of numerous rings and the first, third, fifth, seventh, and eleventh may protrude farther outward than the remaining. The prehensile tail following the bony plates is utilized by the seahorse to grasp onto its environment composed of seaweed and coral. The tail curls forward and is seldom aligned. When a lined seahorse is very young (two weeks to four weeks), the tail is extremely limber. The snout length is approximately half the head length of the lined seahorse. The cheek spines, located diagonally down from the eye on either side may be single or double. In total, the lined seahorse has eleven trunk rings, 34–39 tail rings, 16–20 dorsal fin rays, and 14–18 pectoral fin rays. The pectoral fin is level with the eye on each back side of the lined seahorse's head. The dorsal fin is located on the back of the skeleton and is level with the stomach–chest area. Female dorsal fins are slightly larger than the male's and are located lower on the back. The eyes of the lined seahorse can concentrate together, or they can operate independently of one another. The lined seahorse may be considered sexually mature as early as four months; however, it is typically about eight months. The minimum size of a sexually mature lined seahorse is 5.6 cm.

== Habitat and distribution ==
The lined seahorse range spans from the waters to the south of Nova Scotia, to the southern area of Venezuela in South America. They can be found on the east coast of United States in Connecticut, Delaware, Florida, Georgia, Louisiana, Maryland, New Jersey, New York, Rhode Island, Virginia, and the Carolinas, as well as in the waters surrounding Mexico and the Caribbean. Species found in Brazil seem to be of a different species; however, more research is needed to determine this proposal. The lined seahorse is native to the following locations: United States, Bermuda, Cuba, Mexico (Veracruz, Yucatán), Haiti, Saint Kitts and Nevis, Belize, Honduras, Nicaragua, Costa Rica, Panama, Guatemala, and Venezuela. It has also been recorded from the Azores but it is not clear that a population has become established in the waters around that archipelago.

Its habitats are marine intertidal and marine neritic.

The species is found in depths of water up to seventy-three meters. Adults can be found swimming freely in the water column or attached to a stationary object. Juveniles usually swim near the surface. The habitat of the lined seahorse consists of marine vegetation, such as suspended Sargassum, seagrass, sponges, and mangroves. Depending on the season, the species can be found in shallow waters or deep waters along beaches, oyster beds, and banks covered in vegetation, as well as in bays or salt marshes. Lined seahorses can often be found with their tails wrapped around crab pots as well. In the winter, the seahorses are more prominent in deeper waters, versus warmer months, where they are usually found in shallow waters attached to vegetation.

The temperature in which the H. erectus dwells varies with the different latitudes. Temperature has an effect on gonad development, brood size, and juvenile development and survival. Many lined seahorses experience temperature fluctuations during the daily tide cycles, the different seasons of each year, and due to precipitation or runoff. Adults have the ability to migrate to deeper waters during cold seasons. A study showed that the highest survival and growth rate of juveniles occurred at 28 to 29 degrees Celsius in captivity. In addition to temperature, there is also a large range of salinity concentration depending on the location that affect the species. The most common salinity is 25 to 35 ppt. In captivity, the species is most commonly kept at 35 ppt. The H. erectus is the only species of seahorse native to the Chesapeake Bay.

== Diet ==
The lined seahorse utilizes its elongated snout in order to consume its prey, consisting primarily of minute crustaceans, mollusks, and zooplankton. Unfortunately, some captive parental males have been known to cannibalize small number of its own fry, or juveniles, following its release into natural habitat. In order to ambush its prey, the seahorse employs color changes to camouflage itself with its surrounding environment, locates the prey, and then jerks its head upward, forcing the prey in the right position to be sucked in through its tubular snout. The lined seahorse is highly accurate, especially if its prey is within one inch from its snout. Overall, this process is quick and accurate. A growing lined seahorse may feed continuously for up to ten hours a day, engulfing approximately 3,600 baby brine shrimp.

== Predators and parasites ==
The predators of the lined seahorse include crabs, rays, skates, seabirds, sharks, tuna, and dolphinfish. Although their camouflage tactics reduce their risk of becoming prey, their poor swimming abilities increase their likelihood of being consumed by their predators, especially large fish.

There are many parasites and infections known to affect the lined seahorse, including ciliates (Uronemamarinum), nematodes, fungi, myxosporidian, and microsporidians (Glugea heraldi).

== Behavior ==
A unique characteristic of the lined seahorse (and other species of seahorse) is their practice of monogamy: the male and female seahorses choose partners that they will continue to mate with for their lifetime. The monogamous characteristics of the lined seahorse include ritual dances with their partner that they perform every morning. These dances establish their permanent relationship as mates. If a male or female lined seahorse should lose their partner for any reason, it takes time before they replace their mate.

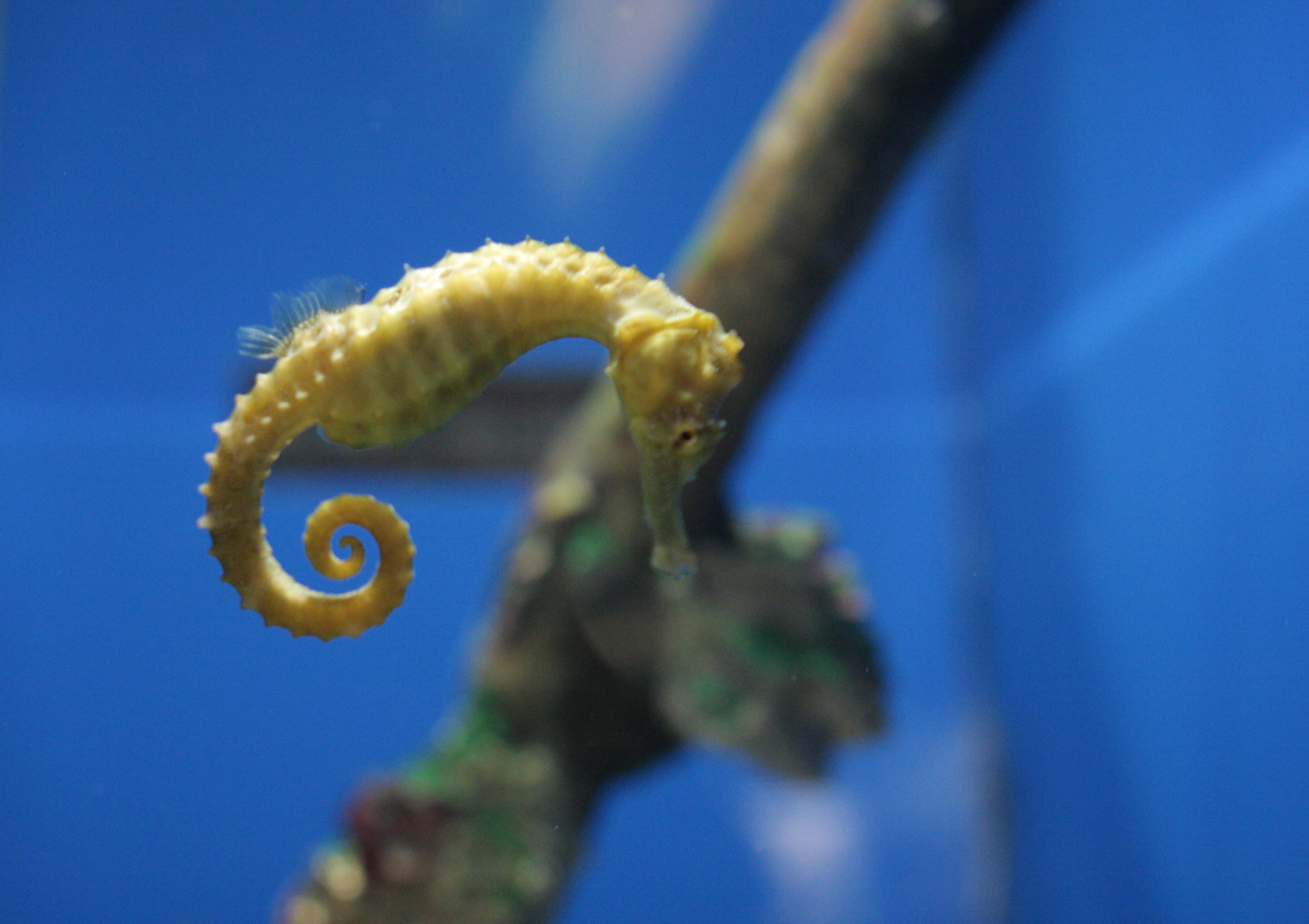
The fins help guide and propel the seahorse.

Lined seahorses are weak swimmers; they swim in an erect position. In comparison to their fins, the lined seahorse's body is too large, another reason why they are poor swimmers. They do not swim for long periods of time, nor do they travel far distances, unless they are migrating. The lined seahorse propels its body forward with its dorsal and pectoral fins, which they move rapidly back and forth. These fins are also utilized in directing their bodies throughout the water and beat twenty to thirty times per second, making them almost invisible at first glance.

In addition to monogamy, the lined seahorse also cues into sound-making in the mating process. The seahorses have a crown-like bony crest called a coronet located on the backside of their head at the edge of the skull. Each coronet is unique to the organism, just as a fingerprint is unique to every human. The coronet resembles a star pattern and is attached rather loosely and has sharp edges. As the seahorse lifts its head, the edge of the skull slides beneath the coronet and out when the seahorse bows its head. As the skull's edge slides beneath and out from the coronet, a clicking sound is produced. Mating seahorses swim slowly together, alternating their clicking sounds, until they embrace one another. Once the male and female seahorse embrace, the sounds from both the male and female unify, becoming indistinguishable from one another. This action creates a louder, consecutive sound, further establishing their bond.

== Reproduction ==
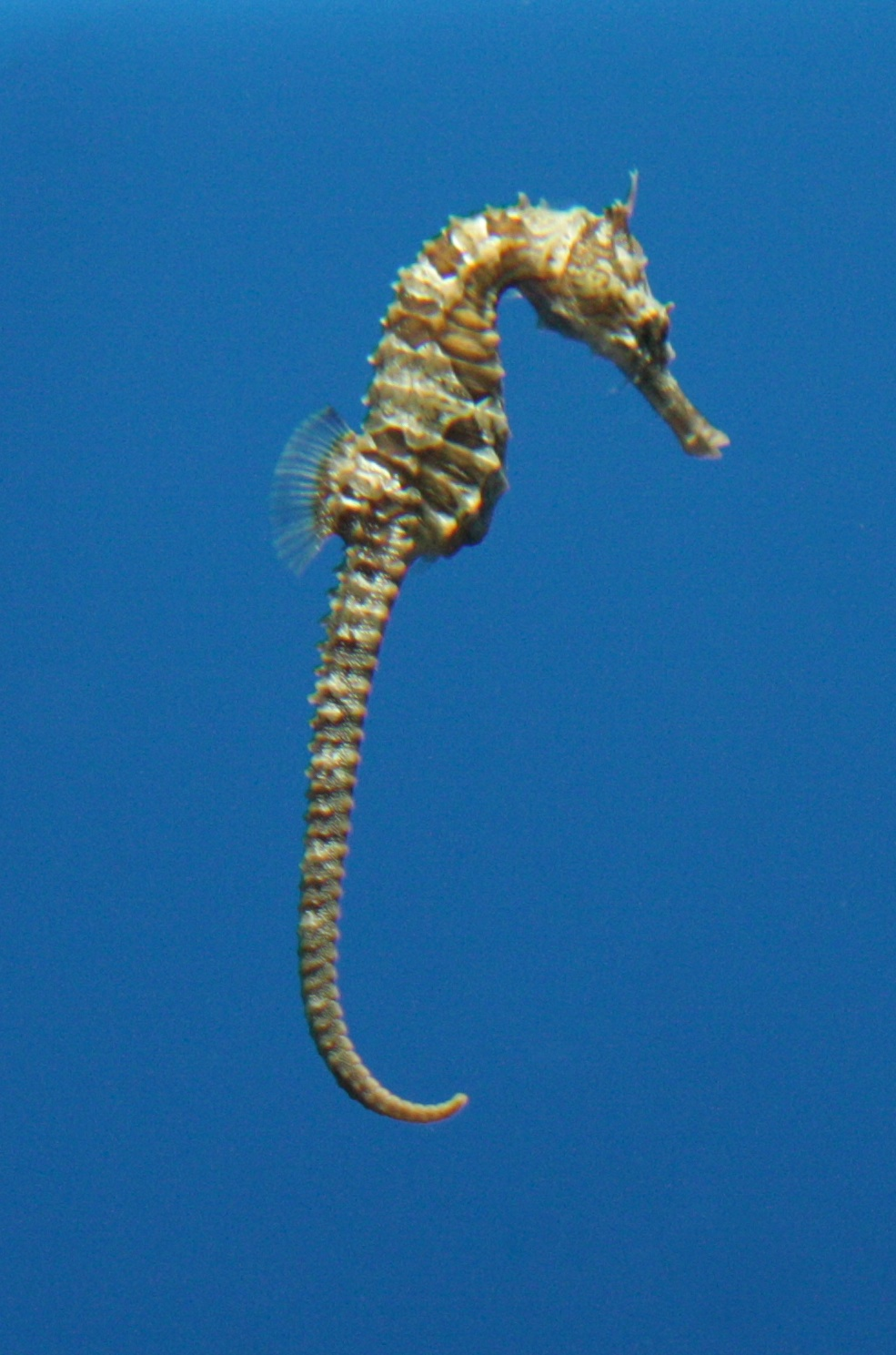
This image shows the prehensile tail utilized in reproduction by the male seahorse.

Like all species of seahorses, the lined seahorse reproduces sexually, laying eggs every season. In addition, the male is the parent that looks after the newborn seahorses. The reproduction process begins at the initiation of the courtship process. Courtship extends for a couple of days and during this process, both the male and female may change to a pale color. The male enlarges his pouch to indicate his desire to pursue the female. Once they are established as monogamous mates though dances and clicking sounds, intercourse takes place.

During intercourse, the female sprays her eggs into the males pouch, which is called a "brood pouch", where they are fertilized and sealed. Females clutch size can be equal to or greater than one thousand and the males' brood size can range from 97 to 1,552 eggs. The number of eggs the female produces varies depending on the size of the seahorse. Six hundred and fifty eggs can be carried by a single male at one time. The eggs are 1.5 mm in diameter. When the eggs are being incubated within the male's pouch, the embryos are provided oxygen via an extensive capillary system. Through this system, the sodium and calcium levels can be altered in order to maintain homeostasis within the pouch environment. When the embryos are approaching birth, the pouch environment is very similar to the seawater. The gestation period lasts for 20–21 days. When the time finally approaches, the male latches his prehensile tail onto a supportive object while he braces back and forth, until the developed seahorses escape from the pouch. The bracing continues until all seahorses have successfully escaped the pouch. However, unhatched seahorses that have died will create a gas within the male's pouch. Soon after, the male seahorse inevitably floats to the surface, only to become easy prey in the marine food chain.

Juveniles are approximately 11 mm at birth for three days and are considered embryos until they are capable of swimming on their own. Juveniles do not reach maximum size until they are 8–10 months of age. It is estimated by scientists that only about two juveniles grow up to be adults out of the hundreds that are hatched. In captivity, the species maintained a vertical growth rate of 0.55 mm a day for 100 days. Male juveniles develop pouches when they are 5–7 months old. The juvenile seahorses quickly develop the characteristic of the adult lined seahorse. After birth, courtship begins once again. Breeding occurs in the months of May through October in the Chesapeake Bay. July is when the lined seahorse population is the greatest in Florida.

== Conservation ==
The lined seahorse species was listed as vulnerable since 1996 and was listed as vulnerable in the 2003 IUCN assessment, indicating no significant improvements in protective factors. Due to loss or harm to their habitat by pollution and coastal development, accidental catch, or by purposeful catch, the lined seahorse's population is starting to dwindle, by values of at least thirty percent, probably since 1996 when changes in its population size were noted. The H. erectus is a very common species of the aquarium trade, which also affects the population remaining in the wild, though the vast majority for sale in the aquarium trade are captive-reared. The lined seahorse is also used for ornamental decoration and for Chinese medicine. Despite being a popular seahorse for aquarium trade and Chinese medicine, it is only suspected that the species could be a potential candidate for commercial aquaculture. If successful, this could positively affect the population of the lined seahorse.

== Aquarium life ==
The minimum habitat requirements for captive lined seahorses consist of a tank 18 inches vertical in height and 20 to 25 gallons for a pair, 30 to 40 gallons for two pairs. The tank should be kept at a constant temperature between 22 and 25 degrees Celsius (72 and 77 degrees Fahrenheit). The ph value should remain between 8.1 and 8.4 and the specific gravity between 1.020 and 1.025.

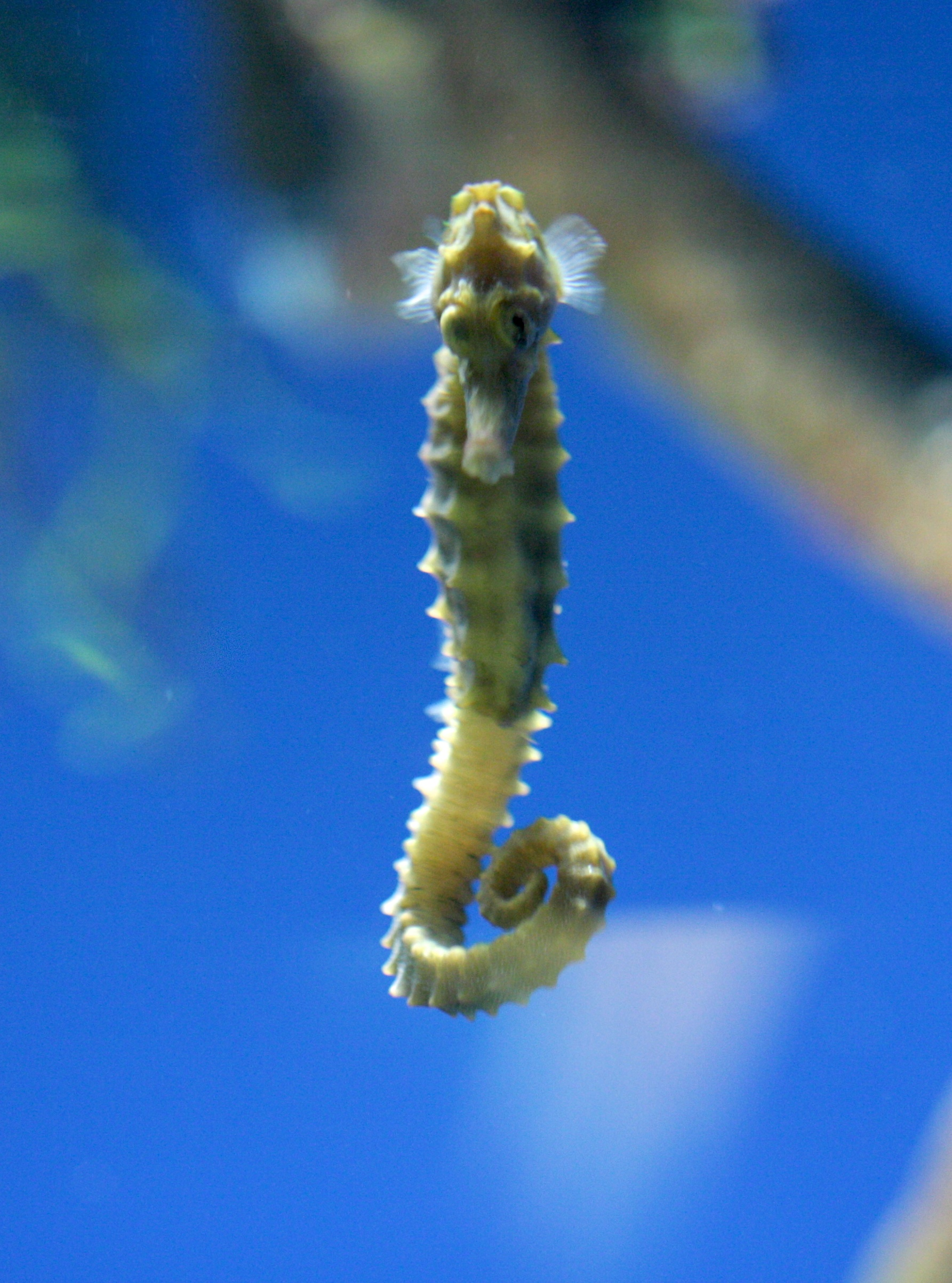
In this front view of the lined seahorse, the eyes can be seen; they can move independently of one another.

The lined seahorse is an easy going species and will not be a threat to other fish that could possibly be in an aquarium. The seahorse thrives in an environment with objects it can hide around and attach its tail to. The H. erectus species should be fed multiple times throughout the day, rather than less amount of larger meals. In captivity, the lined seahorse is often fed live or frozen nauplius or Mysis shrimp, grass shrimp, adult brine shrimp, gammarids and caprellid amphipods, krill fish fry, and frozen krill.
