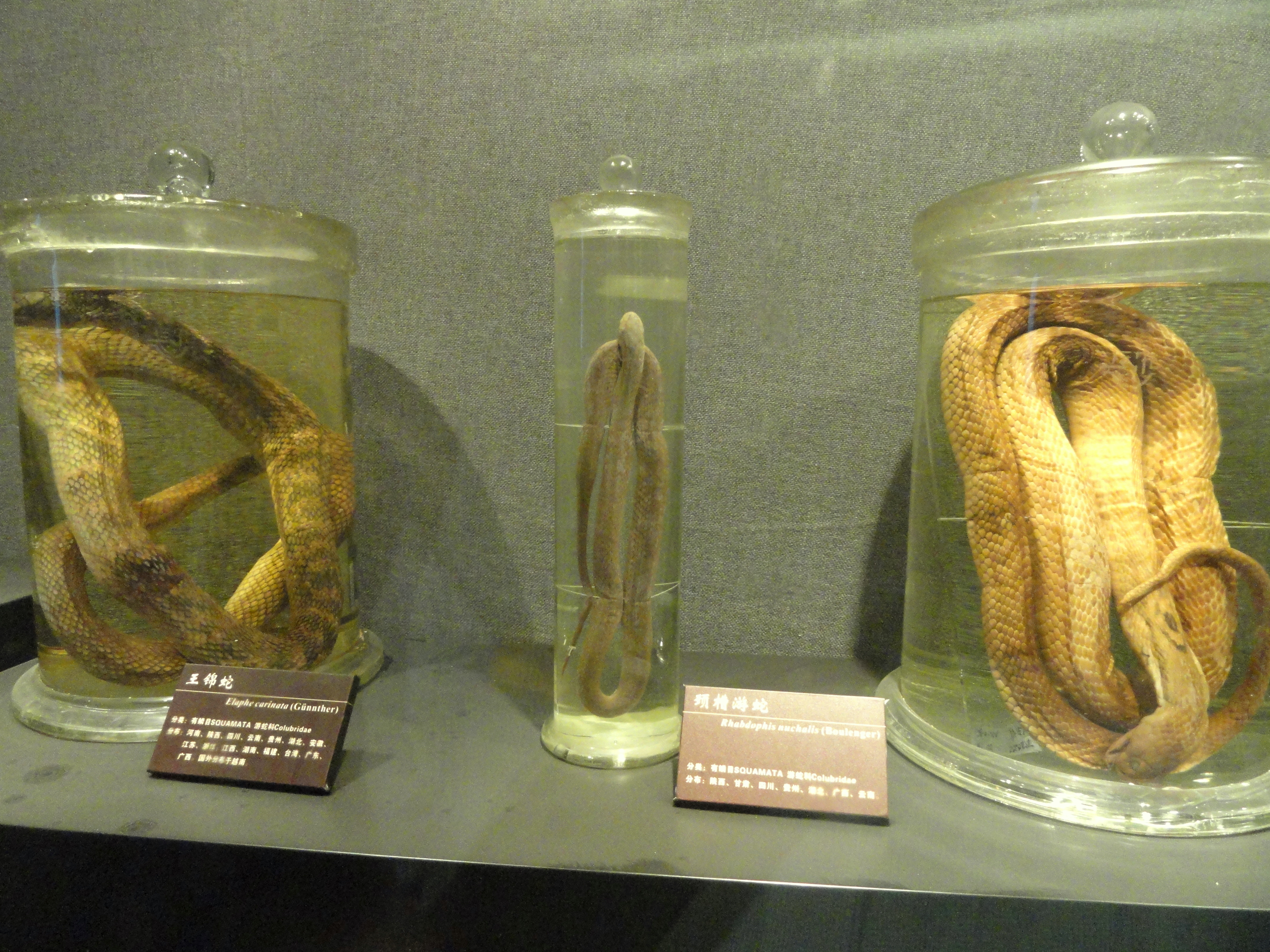

Conservation status
- Least Concern (IUCN 3.1)

Scientific classification
- Kingdom: Animalia
- Phylum: Chordata
- Class: Reptilia
- Order: Squamata
- Suborder: Serpentes
- Family: Colubridae
- Genus: Rhabdophis
- Species: R. pentasupralabialis

Binomial name
- Rhabdophis pentasupralabialis Jiang & Zhao, 1983

Synonyms
- Rhabdophis nuchalis pentasupralabialis

= Rhabdophis pentasupralabialis =

Species of snake

Rhabdophis pentasupralabialis is a keelback snake in the family Colubridae. It is endemic to China and known from Sichuan and Yunnan at elevations of 1,200 and 3,200 m (3,900 and 10,500 ft) above sea level. It was originally described as subspecies of Rhabdophis nuchalis.
