= Rhabdophis adleri =

Conservation status
- Least Concern (IUCN 3.1)

Scientific classification
- Kingdom: Animalia
- Phylum: Chordata
- Class: Reptilia
- Order: Squamata
- Suborder: Serpentes
- Family: Colubridae
- Genus: Rhabdophis
- Species: R. adleri

Binomial name
- Rhabdophis adleri Zhao, 1997

Species of snake

Rhabdophis adleri is a species of keelback snake in the subfamily Natricinae of the family Colubridae. The species is endemic to China.

== Etymology ==
The specific name, adleri, is in honor of American herpetologist Kraig Adler.

== Geographic range ==
R. adleri is found on Hainan Island, China.

== Habitat ==
The preferred natural habitats of R. adleri are forest, shrubland, and grassland, at altitudes of 82–1,000 m (269–3,281 ft).

== Diet ==
R. adleri preys upon fishes and frogs.

== Reproduction ==
R. adleri is oviparous.
