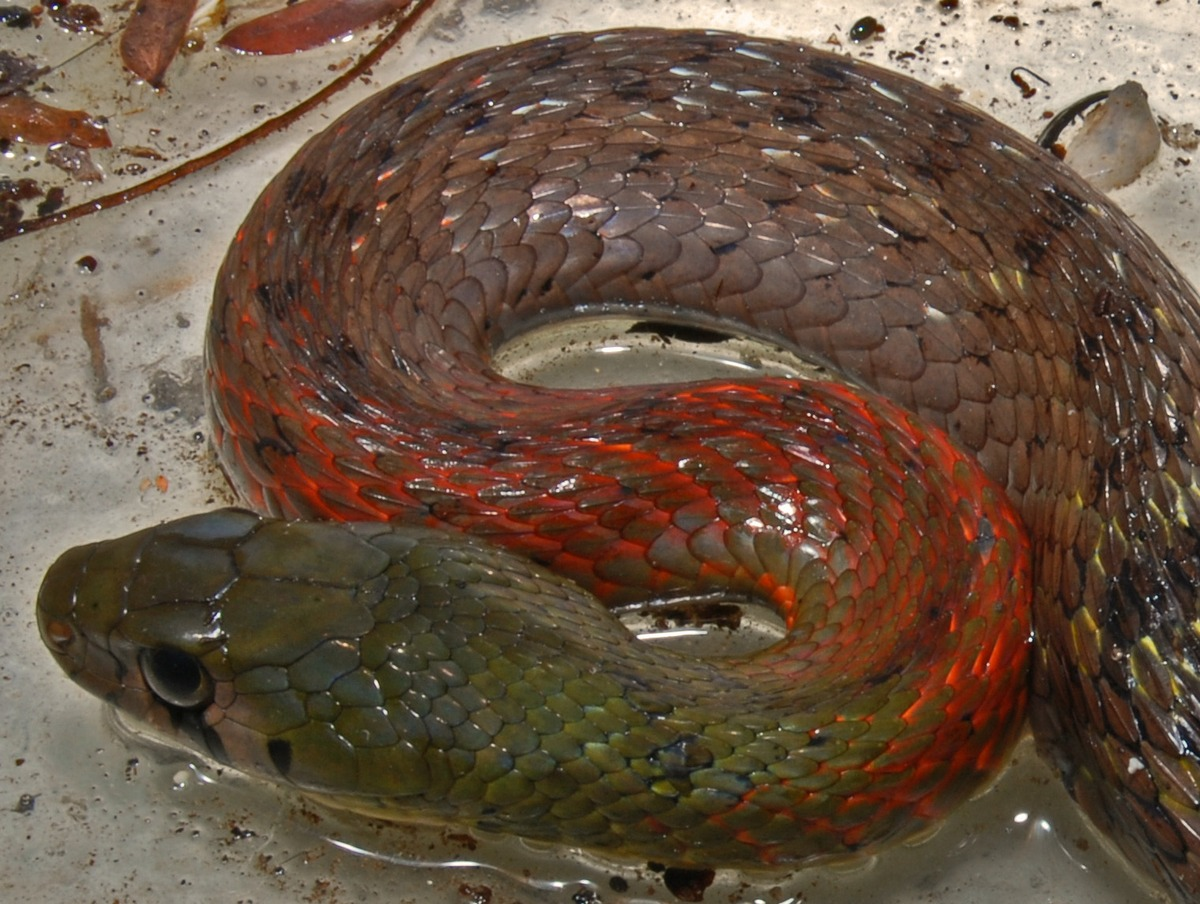
- Rhabdophis subminiatus

Scientific classification
- Kingdom: Animalia
- Phylum: Chordata
- Class: Reptilia
- Order: Squamata
- Suborder: Serpentes
- Family: Colubridae
- Subfamily: Natricinae
- Genus: Rhabdophis; Fitzinger, 1843

Species
- 30, see text.

= Rhabdophis =

Genus of snakes

Rhabdophis is a genus of snakes in the subfamily Natricinae of the family Colubridae. Species in the genus Rhabdophis are generally called keelback snakes, and are found primarily in Southeast Asia. The best-known species is Rhabdophis tigrinus; few other species have been studied in detail.

== Toxicity ==
Colubrid snakes are often thought of as completely harmless, but there are a handful of notable exceptions, including some species of Rhabdophis. Bites from both Rhabdophis tigrinus and Rhabdophis subminiatus have caused cases of severe envenomation. There are several reports of fatal bites from R. tigrinus. Between 1971 and 2020, 5 of 43 R. tigrinus bites in Japan were fatal, all of which occurred in cases not treated with antivenom. Antivenom is manufactured by the Japan Snake Institute and is an effective treatment for R. tigrinus bites, but is an unapproved drug. The venom is highly hemorrhagic.

While the term "poisonous snake" is often incorrectly used for a wide variety of venomous snakes, some species of Rhabdophis are in fact poisonous as well as venomous. Many species of Rhabdophis have specialized nuchal glands on the back of the neck that are used to store cardiotonic steroids (bufadienolides) sequestered from their diet, mostly from toads but also from firefly larvae. Rhabdophis are resistant to the toxic effects of these chemicals. This is different from their venom, which is produced in oral glands and is not known to contain bufadienolides or other sequestered toxins. Female Rhabdophis tigrinus can pass sequestered chemicals to their offspring, both by deposition in egg yolk and by transfer across the egg membranes within the oviduct, late in gestation.

== Recent taxonomic changes ==
In 2018, Balanophis ceylonensis and three of the four species in the genus Macropisthodon were reassigned to Rhabdophis on the basis of three genes indicating a common ancestor for all species possessing nuchal glands. At least two species, “R”. conspicillatus and “R”. chrysargos, are more distantly related and might be assigned to other genera in the future. The same analysis suggested that Rhabdophis might contain several undescribed species.

== Species ==
These species are recognized as being valid:

- Rhabdophis adleri Zhao, 1997
- Rhabdophis akraios Doria, Petri, Bellati, Tiso & Pistarino, 2013 – Singalang keelback
- Rhabdophis angeli (Bourret, 1934) – Angel's keelback
- Rhabdophis auriculatus (Günther, 1858) – white-lined water snake
- Rhabdophis barbouri (Taylor, 1922) – Barbour's water snake
- Rhabdophis bindi Das, E.N. Smith, Sidik, Sarker, Boruah, N.G. Patel, Murthy & Deepak, 2021 – Bindee keelback
- Rhabdophis callichroma (Bourret, 1934) – Bavi keelback
- Rhabdophis callistus (Günther, 1873) – Boettger's keelback
- Rhabdophis ceylonensis (Günther, 1858) – Sri Lanka blossom krait, Sri Lanka keelback
- Rhabdophis chiwen Z. Chen, Ding, Q. Chen & Piao, 2020 – Chiwen keelback
- Rhabdophis chrysargoides (Günther, 1858) – Javanese keelback, Günther's keelback
- Rhabdophis chrysargos (Schlegel, 1837) – specklebelly keelback
- Rhabdophis confusus David & G. Vogel, 2021
- Rhabdophis conspicillatus (Günther, 1872) – red-bellied keelback
- Rhabdophis flaviceps (A.M.C. Duméril, Bibron & A.H.A. Duméril, 1854) – orangeneck keelback, orange-lipped keelback, yellow-headed keelback
- Rhabdophis guangdongensis Zhu, Wang, Takeuchi & Zhao, 2014 – Guangdong keelback
- Rhabdophis helleri (Schmidt, 1925) – Heller’s red-necked keelback
- Rhabdophis himalayanus (Günther, 1864) – orange-collared keelback
- Rhabdophis hmongorum (Kane, Tapley, La & Nguyen, 2023) – H’mong keelback snake
- Rhabdophis leonardi (Wall, 1923) – Burmese keelback, Leonard's keelback
- Rhabdophis lineatus (W. Peters, 1861) – zigzag-lined water snake
- Rhabdophis murudensis (M.A. Smith, 1925) – Muruden keelback, Gunung Murud keelback
- Rhabdophis nigrocinctus (Blyth, 1856) – black-striped keelback
- Rhabdophis nuchalis (Boulenger, 1891) – Hubei keelback
- Rhabdophis pentasupralabialis Jiang & Zhao, 1983
- Rhabdophis plumbicolor (Cantor, 1839) – green keelback, lead keelback
- Rhabdophis rhodomelas (H. Boie, 1827) – blueneck keelback, blue-necked keelback
- Rhabdophis siamensis (Mell, 1931)
- Rhabdophis subminiatus (Schlegel, 1837) – red-necked keelback
- Rhabdophis swinhonis (Günther, 1868) – Swinhoe's grass snake
- Rhabdophis tigrinus (H. Boie, 1826) – tiger grooved-neck keelback, tiger keelback, Japanese grass snake, yamakagashi

Nota bene: A binomial authority in parentheses indicates that the species was originally described in a genus other than Rhabdophis.
