= Rhabdophis barbouri =

Conservation status
- Data Deficient (IUCN 3.1)

Scientific classification
- Kingdom: Animalia
- Phylum: Chordata
- Class: Reptilia
- Order: Squamata
- Suborder: Serpentes
- Family: Colubridae
- Genus: Rhabdophis
- Species: R. barbouri

Binomial name
- Rhabdophis barbouri (Taylor, 1922)

Synonyms
- Natrix barbouri Taylor, 1922; Macropophis barbouri — Malnate, 1960; Rhabdophis barbori — Malnate & Underwood, 1998

Species of snake

Rhabdophis barbouri, also known commonly as Barbour's water snake, is a species of keelback snake in the subfamily Natricinae of the family Colubridae. The species is endemic to the Philippines.

== Etymology ==
The specific name, barbouri, is in honor of American herpetologist Thomas Barbour.

== Geographic range ==
R. barbouri is found on the island of Luzon.

== Reproduction ==
R. barbouri is oviparous.
