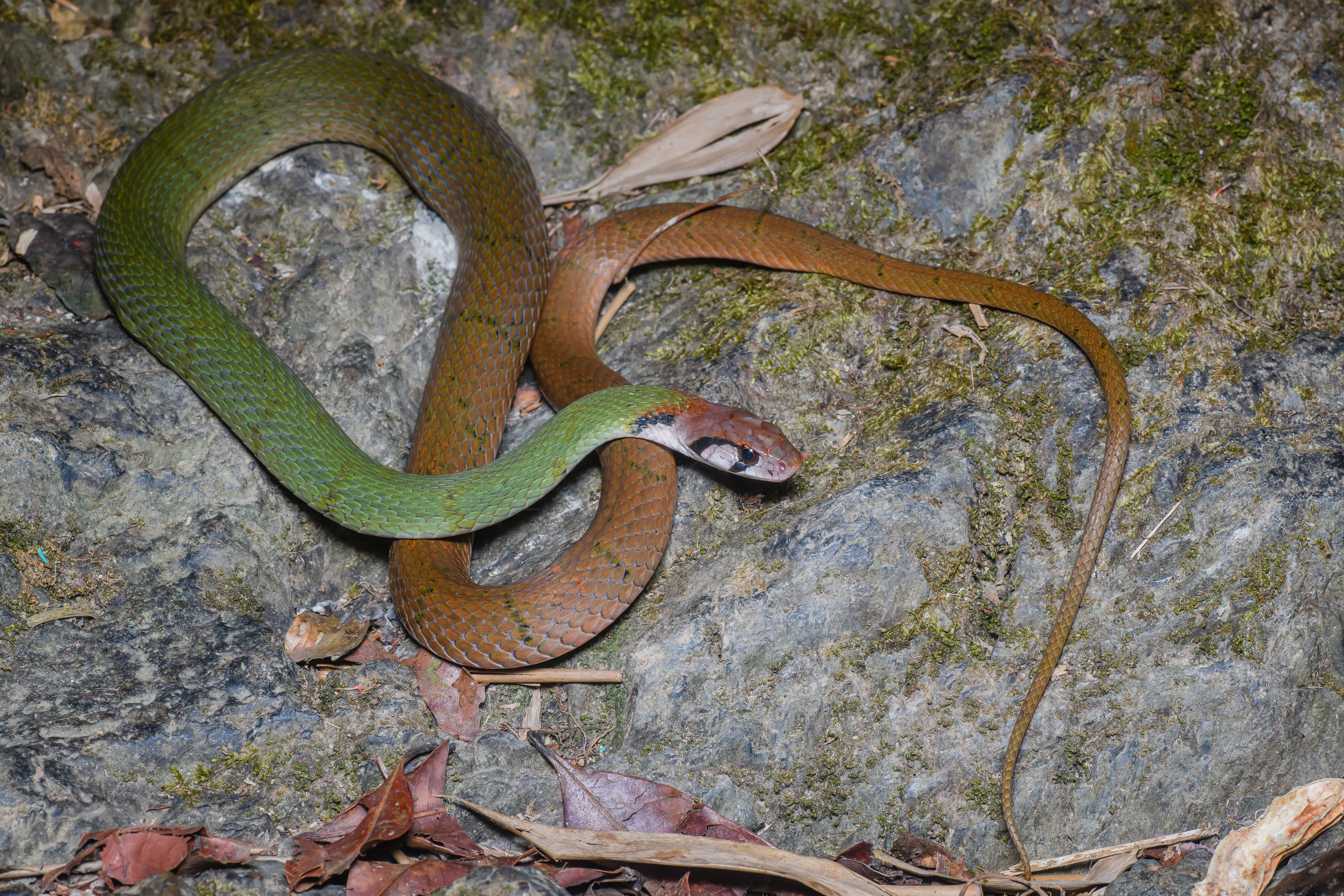

Conservation status
- Least Concern (IUCN 3.1)

Scientific classification
- Kingdom: Animalia
- Phylum: Chordata
- Class: Reptilia
- Order: Squamata
- Suborder: Serpentes
- Family: Colubridae
- Genus: Rhabdophis
- Species: R. nigrocinctus

Binomial name
- Rhabdophis nigrocinctus (Blyth, 1856)

Synonyms
- Tropidonotus nigrocinctus Blyth 1856; Tropidonotus nigrocinctus — Boulenger 1893: 255; Tropidonotus eisenhoferi Gyldenstolpe 1916; Rhabdophis nigrocincta — Wall 1923; Pseudoxenodon fruhstorferi Werner 1925; Natrix nigrocincta — Smith 1943: 307; Rhabdophis nigrocincta — Malnate 1960; Rhabdophis nigrocinctus — Manthey & Grossmann 1997; Rhabdophis nigrocinctus — Cox et al. 1998; Rhabdophis nigrocinctus — Sand et al. 2009

= Rhabdophis nigrocinctus =

Species of snake

Rhabdophis nigrocinctus, also known as the black-striped keelback, green keelback, or banded keelback, is a keelback snake in the family Colubridae found in Myanmar, Thailand, Laos, Cambodia, Vietnam, and Yunnan (SW China).
