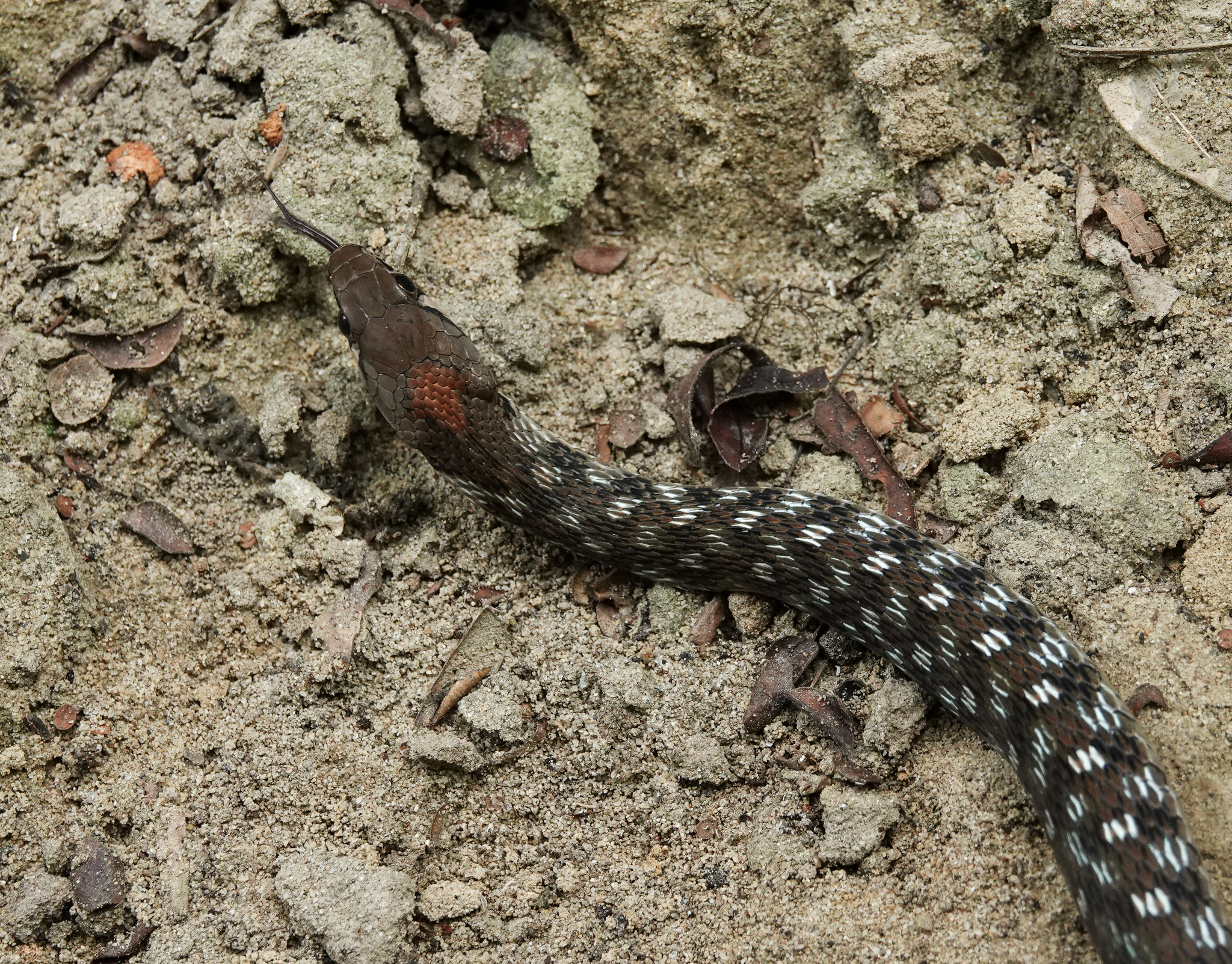

Scientific classification
- Kingdom: Animalia
- Phylum: Chordata
- Order: Squamata
- Suborder: Serpentes
- Family: Colubridae
- Genus: Rhabdophis
- Species: R. bindi

Binomial name
- Rhabdophis bindi Das, Smith, Sidik, Sarker, Boruah, Patel, Murthy, & Deepak, 2021

= Rhabdophis bindi =

Species of snake

Rhabdophis bindi, the Bindee keelback, is a keelback snake in the family Colubridae found in India and Bangladesh.

== Description ==
Rhabdophis bindi has a dark brown dorsum with lighter spots along the mid dorsal line. Labials are light brown with some parts paler, edged with black. It features two thick black lines, one below the eye and another from behind the eye to the angle of the jaw. A series of narrow white spots run along the mid dorsum, becoming cream-colored towards the tail. A scarlet diamond-shaped mark is present on the neck. Ventrals are uniformly white with black-edged outer edges, and subcaudals are yellowish with light black spray.

== Etymology ==
The species epithet, "bindi", is referring to the unique red marking on the nape region of Rhabdophis bindi which is similar to the Bindi, a red beauty spot adorning the foreheads of Indian women and signifying the point of creation of the cosmos.

== Distribution ==
Rhabdophis bindi is found in India and Bangladesh. In India, it's recorded in Maruacherra and Lakhicherra near the Barail Hill Range and Jatinga river. Also found in Assam-Mizoram border, northern Tripura, and Maulavibazar District, Sreemangal, and Lawachara National Park in Bangladesh. Historically collected in Kaptai, Chittagong, Bangladesh, preferring low elevations.

== Ecology and Habitat ==
Rhabdophis bindi is primarily found in lowland evergreen forests, specifically within the Cachar Tropical Evergreen Forest and Cachar Tropical Semi-evergreen Forest regions. It inhabits areas characterized by cultivated land, bamboo brakes, tree plantations, secondary forests, and village gardens. The species thrives in a tropical climate with high precipitation, experiencing a brief dry period from January to March. Its habitat includes the Lakhicherra stream, a third-order evergreen forest stream, where it can be found even during dry seasons, particularly in deep sections with pooled water.

Activity patterns of Rhabdophis bindi vary with the seasons. During the dry season, individuals seek refuge under accumulated vegetation along the stream bed. Heavy rainfall in May and June prompts them to move to moist slopes near water puddles or away from the streambed. The species is diurnal, with occasional sightings during dusk. In Bangladesh, it has been observed near water sources and even railway lines.

Breeding occurs in May, with a gravid female recorded carrying three eggs. Their diet consists of amphibians such as Euphlyctis cyanophlyctis and Hydrophylax leptoglossa. Defensive behaviors include flattening the head and anterior body, similar to other species in the Rhabdophis genus.

Individuals are docile and rarely attempt to bite, even when handled. Tail breakage, observed in some males, is a phenomenon also seen in related snake species.
