= Rhabdophis guangdongensis =

Scientific classification
- Kingdom: Animalia
- Phylum: Chordata
- Class: Reptilia
- Order: Squamata
- Suborder: Serpentes
- Family: Colubridae
- Genus: Rhabdophis
- Species: R. guangdongensis

Binomial name
- Rhabdophis guangdongensis Zhu, Wang, Takeuchi & Zhao, 2014

Species of snake

Rhabdophis guangdongensis, commonly known as the Guangdong keelback, is a keelback snake in the family Colubridae. It is endemic to Guangdong, southern China.
