= Rhabdophis auriculatus =

Conservation status
- Least Concern (IUCN 3.1)

Scientific classification
- Kingdom: Animalia
- Phylum: Chordata
- Class: Reptilia
- Order: Squamata
- Suborder: Serpentes
- Family: Colubridae
- Genus: Rhabdophis
- Species: R. auriculatus

Binomial name
- Rhabdophis auriculatus (Günther, 1858)

Species of snake

Rhabdophis auriculatus, the white-lined water snake or Günther's white-lined water snake, is a keelback snake in the family Colubridae. Its name comes from the Latin word auris (ear) and auricula (earlobe), since the species has a white spot behind its eye where its ear is expected.

There are two subspecies: Rhabdophis auriculatus auriculatus and Rhabdophis auriculatus myersi.

== Biology ==
Some species in the Rhabdophis genus are venomous, but the venom of this species is unknown. Its method of reproduction is oviparous.

== Distribution ==
The population of Rhabdophis auriculatus is unknown and has a conservation status of least concern as of April 22, 2007. However, they do face threats such as housing, mining, logging and wood harvesting.

This species can be found in the Philippines. This species habitat are wetlands and forest. R. auriculatus lives at elevations from 75 meters to 2,100 meters. It has been found on many islands such as Samar Island (as well as the subspecies Rhabdophis auriculatus auriculatus). On the other hand, subspecies Rhabdophis auriculatus myersi has been found on Mindanao Island.
