= Rhabdophis conspicillatus =

Conservation status
- Least Concern (IUCN 3.1)

Scientific classification
- Kingdom: Animalia
- Phylum: Chordata
- Class: Reptilia
- Order: Squamata
- Suborder: Serpentes
- Family: Colubridae
- Genus: Rhabdophis
- Species: R. conspicillatus

Binomial name
- Rhabdophis conspicillatus (Günther, 1872)

Species of snake

Rhabdophis conspicillatus, the red-bellied keelback, is a keelback snake in the family Colubridae found in Indonesia and Malaysia.
