= Rhabdophis leonardi =

Conservation status
- Least Concern (IUCN 3.1)

Scientific classification
- Kingdom: Animalia
- Phylum: Chordata
- Class: Reptilia
- Order: Squamata
- Suborder: Serpentes
- Family: Colubridae
- Genus: Rhabdophis
- Species: R. leonardi

Binomial name
- Rhabdophis leonardi (Wall, 1923)

Synonyms
- Natrix leonardi Wall, 1923; Natrix swinhonis leonardi Wall, 1923; Natrix nivalis Schmidt, 1925; Tropidonotus nuchalis var. collaris C. Vogt, 1927

Species of snake

Rhabdophis leonardi, also known commonly as the Burmese keelback and Leonard's keelback, is a species of snake in the subfamily Natricinae of the family Colubridae. The species is native to Southeast Asia.

== Etymology ==
The specific name, leonardi, is in honor of P.M.R. Leonard of the Burma Frontier Service, who collected the holotype.

== Geographic range ==
R. leonardi is found in south central China, Laos, and Myanmar.

== Habitat ==
The preferred natural habitat of R. leonardi is grassland, at altitudes of 1,250–2,850 m (4,100–9,350 ft), but it has also been found in cropland.

== Diet ==
R. leonardi preys upon earthworms and the larvae of fireflies.

== Reproduction ==
R. leonardi is oviparous. Clutch size is 9–19 eggs.
