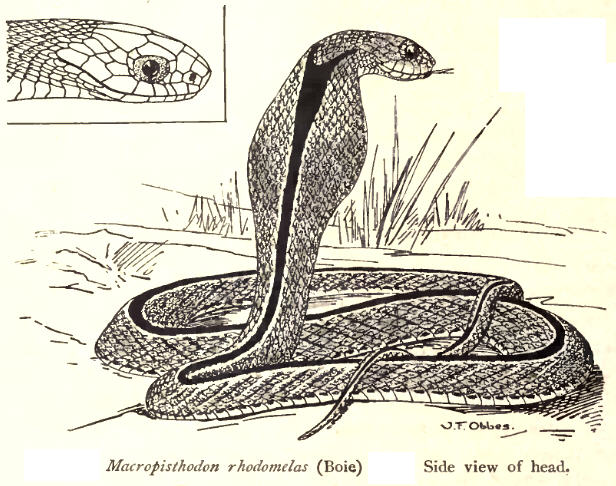

Conservation status
- Least Concern (IUCN 3.1)

Scientific classification
- Kingdom: Animalia
- Phylum: Chordata
- Class: Reptilia
- Order: Squamata
- Suborder: Serpentes
- Family: Colubridae
- Genus: Rhabdophis
- Species: R. rhodomelas

Binomial name
- Rhabdophis rhodomelas (H. Boie, 1827)

Synonyms
- Tropidonotus rhodomelas H. Boie in F. Boie, 1827; Amphiesma rhodomelas; Xenodon rhodomelas; Tropidonotus mortoni Theobald, 1868; Macropisthodon rhodomelus; Macropisthodon rhodomelas

= Rhabdophis rhodomelas =

Species of snake

Rhabdophis rhodomelas, the blueneck keelback or blue-necked keelback, is a species of snake in the subfamily Natricinae of the family Colubridae. It is found in the Malay Peninsula (southern Thailand, Peninsular Malaysia, Singapore), Borneo (Sarawak and Sabah, Malaysia; Kalimantan, Indonesia), and in the western parts of the Indonesian Archipelago (Sumatra, Java, Bangka Island).

Rhabdophis rhodomelas is an uncommon species found in lowland forest near streams and rivers at elevations less than 200 m (660 ft) above sea level. It is oviparous, laying up to 27 eggs per clutch.

In the popular book, Fascinating Snakes of South East Asia - An Introduction. By Francis Lim Leong Keng & Monty Lee Tat-Mong. 1989 ISBN 967-73-0045-8. Page 61 There is a photo and short description of this snake. It states that " When disturbed, the Blue-Necked Keelback will rear up and flatten its neck like the Cobra. A whitish discharge, secreted by glands under the skin, oozes onto the blue patch of the neck-the purpose of this phenomenon is still a mystery." After much research we cannot find any further reference to this phenomenon.
