= Rhabdophis akraios =

Conservation status
- Data Deficient (IUCN 3.1)

Scientific classification
- Kingdom: Animalia
- Phylum: Chordata
- Class: Reptilia
- Order: Squamata
- Suborder: Serpentes
- Family: Colubridae
- Genus: Rhabdophis
- Species: R. akraios

Binomial name
- Rhabdophis akraios Doria, Petri, Bellati, Tiso, & Pistarino, 2013

Species of snake

Rhabdophis akraios, the Singalang keelback, is a keelback snake in the family Colubridae. It is endemic to Sumatra, Indonesia.

The two known specimens measure 77–88 cm (30.3–34.6 in) in total length. They were collected from Mount Singalang (West Sumatra) by Odoardo Beccari in 1878. There is no recent information on this species.
