= Rhabdophis chiwen =

Scientific classification
- Kingdom: Animalia
- Phylum: Chordata
- Class: Reptilia
- Order: Squamata
- Suborder: Serpentes
- Family: Colubridae
- Genus: Rhabdophis
- Species: R. chiwen

Binomial name
- Rhabdophis chiwen Chen, Ding, Chen, & Piao, 2020

Species of snake

Rhabdophis chiwen, the Chiwen keelback, is a keelback snake in the family Colubridae. It is endemic to Sichuan (China) and known from its type locality, Jiguan Mountain in Chongzhou, and from the neighboring Tianquan County.

Adult males measure 404–431 mm (15.9–17.0 in) and adult females 409–476 mm (16.1–18.7 in) in snout–vent length. The tail is 104–131 mm (4.1–5.2 in) and 91–107 mm (3.6–4.2 in) in males and females, respectively.
