= Rhabdophis angeli =

Conservation status
- Data Deficient (IUCN 3.1)

Scientific classification
- Kingdom: Animalia
- Phylum: Chordata
- Class: Reptilia
- Order: Squamata
- Suborder: Serpentes
- Family: Colubridae
- Genus: Rhabdophis
- Species: R. angeli

Binomial name
- Rhabdophis angeli (Bourret, 1934)

Synonyms
- Natrix angelii Bourret, 1934; Rhabdophis angelii — Bourret, 1936; Natrix angeli — M.A. Smith, 1943; Amphiesma angelii — V.S. Nguyen & Ho, 1996; Rhabdophis angelii — Orlov, R.W. Murphy & Papenfuss, 2000; Rhabdophis angeli — V.S. Nguyen, Ho & T.Q. Nguyen, 2009

Species of snake

Rhabdophis angeli, also known commonly as Angel's keelback, is a species of keelback snake in the subfamily Natricinae of the family Colubridae. The species is endemic to Vietnam.

== Etymology ==
The specific name, angeli, is in honor of French herpetologist Fernand Angel.

== Geographic range ==
Rhabdophis angeli is found in northern Vietnam, in Thái Nguyên Province and Vĩnh Phúc Province.

== Habitat ==
The preferred natural habitat of Rhabdophis angeli is forest.

== Description ==
Rhabdophis angeli may attain a total length (including tail) of 43 cm (17 in).

== Reproduction ==
Rhabdophis angeli is oviparous.
