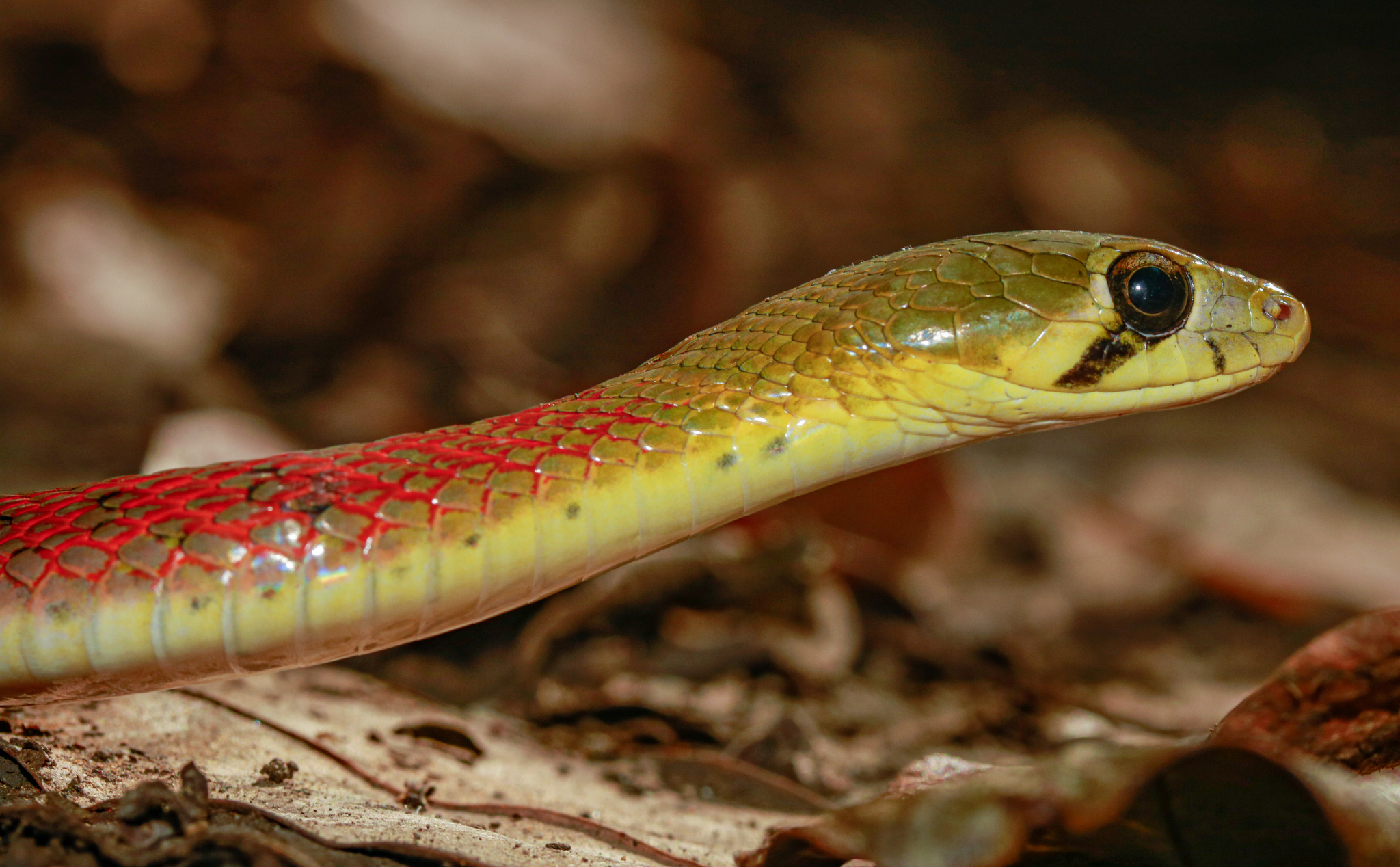

Scientific classification
- Kingdom: Animalia
- Phylum: Chordata
- Class: Reptilia
- Order: Squamata
- Suborder: Serpentes
- Family: Colubridae
- Genus: Rhabdophis
- Species: R. siamensis

Binomial name
- Rhabdophis siamensis (Mell, 1931)

= Rhabdophis siamensis =

Species of snake

Rhabdophis siamensis is a keelback snake in the family Colubridae found in Thailand, Vietnam and China.

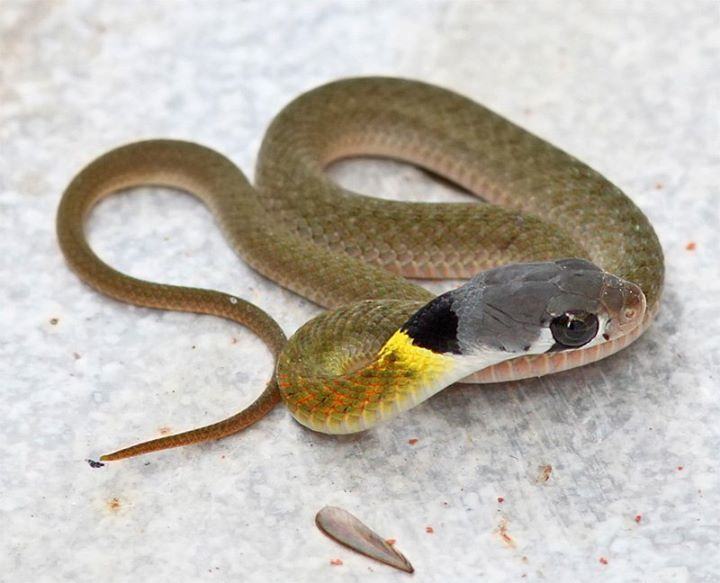
Juvenile

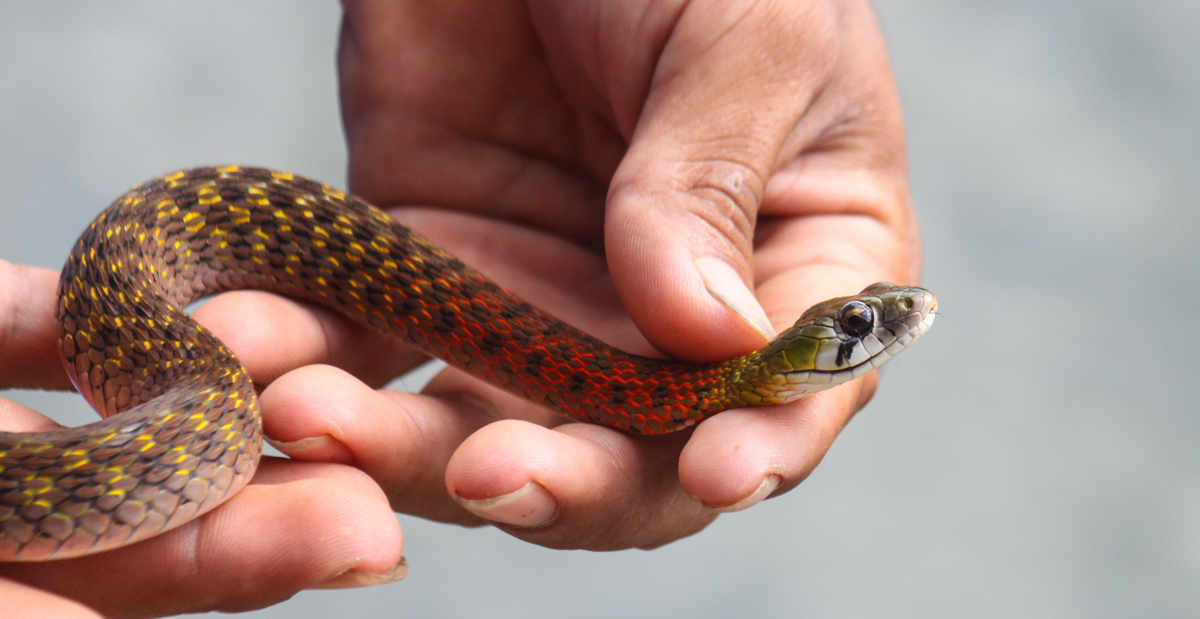
Adult
