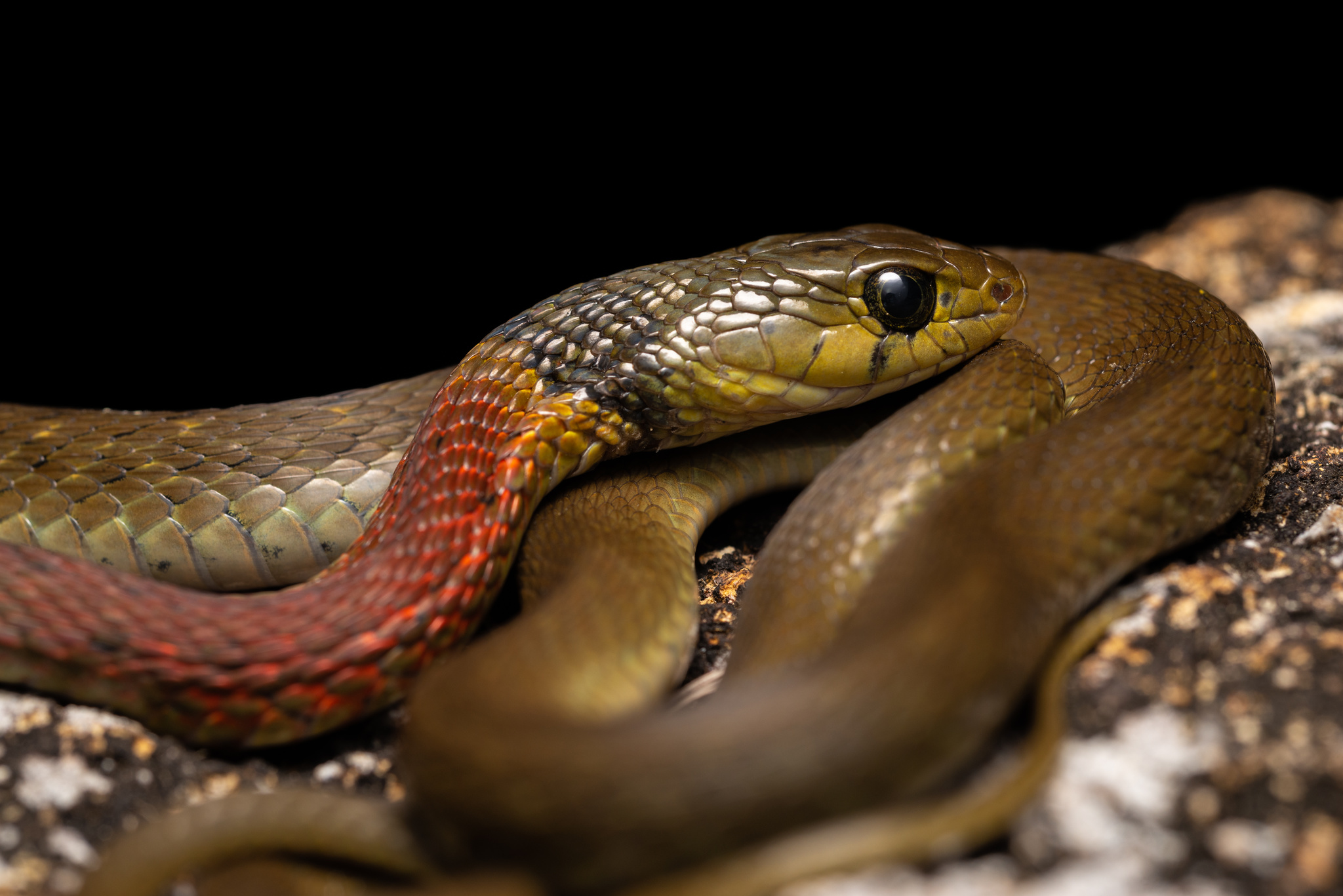
- In Hong Kong

Scientific classification
- Kingdom: Animalia
- Phylum: Chordata
- Class: Reptilia
- Order: Squamata
- Suborder: Serpentes
- Family: Colubridae
- Genus: Rhabdophis
- Species: R. helleri

Binomial name
- Rhabdophis helleri (Schmidt, 1925)

Synonyms
- Natrix helleri Schmidt, 1925; Natrix subminiata helleri — Mell, 1931; Rhabdophis subminiatus var. helleri — Deuve, 1961; Rhabdophis subminiata helleri — Taylor, 1965; Rhabdophis helleri — Liu et al., 2021

= Rhabdophis helleri =

Species of snake

Rhabdophis helleri, also known commonly as Heller’s red-necked keelback, is a venomous species of keelback snake in the subfamily Natricinae of the family Colubridae. The species is native to South Asia.

== Etymology ==
The specific name, helleri, is in honor of American zoologist Edmund Heller.

== Geographic range ==
R. helleri is found in Bangladesh, Bhutan, China (Fujian, Guangdong, Guangxi, Guizhou, Hong Kong, Sichuan, Yunnan), India (Arunachal Pradesh, Assam, Mizoram, Sikkim, Tripura), Myanmar, Nepal, and northern Vietnam.

Type locality: Tengyueh, 5500 feet elevation, Province of Yunnan, China, 25°01'N, 98°30'E.

== Description ==
A medium-sized snake, R. helleri may attain a total length (including tail) of 1.3 m (4.3 ft). It has 163–172 ventrals.

== Reproduction ==
R. helleri is oviparous.

== Venom ==
The venom of R. helleri can cause severe coagulopathy, but no human fatalities have been reported.

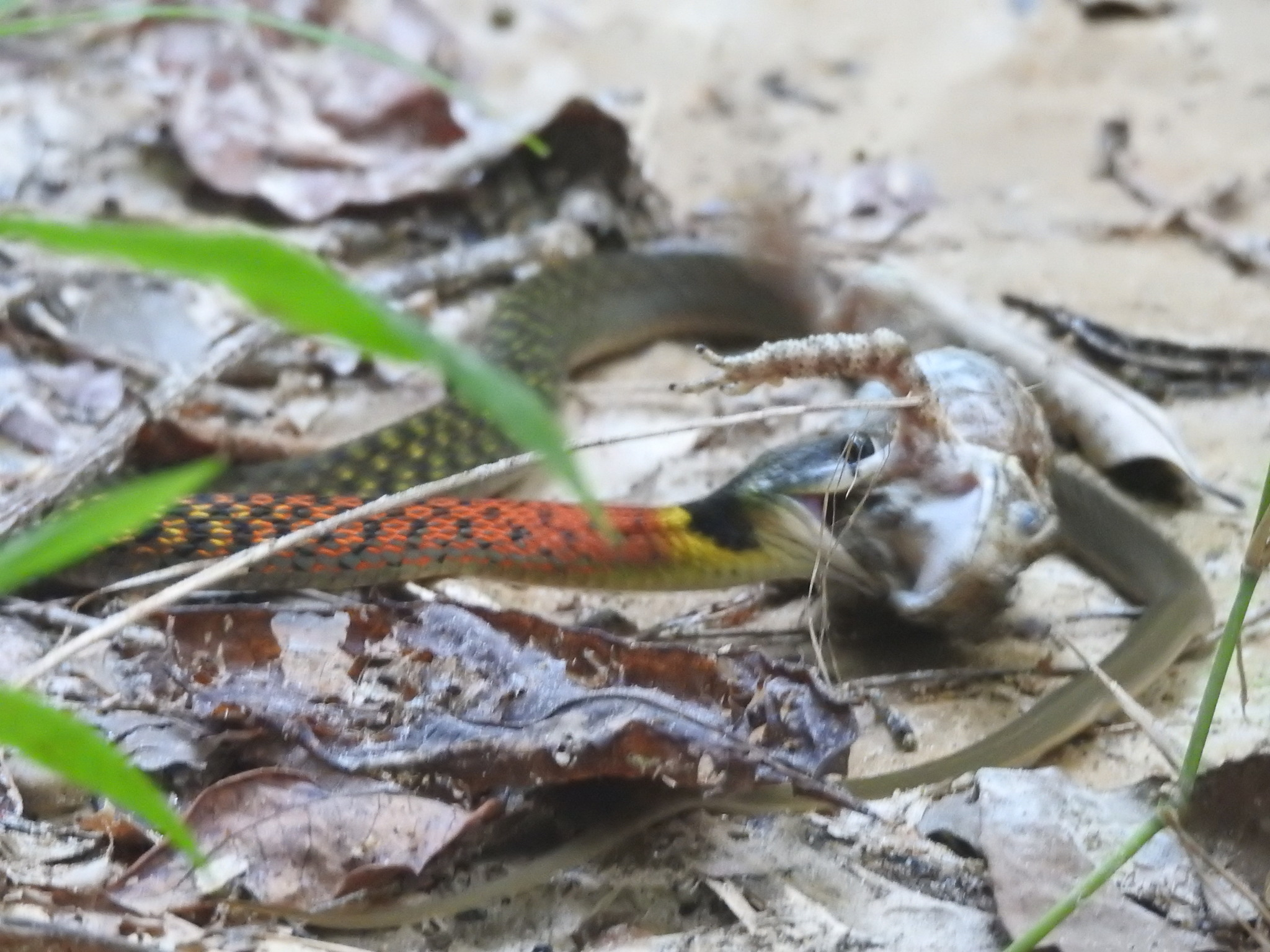
Feeding

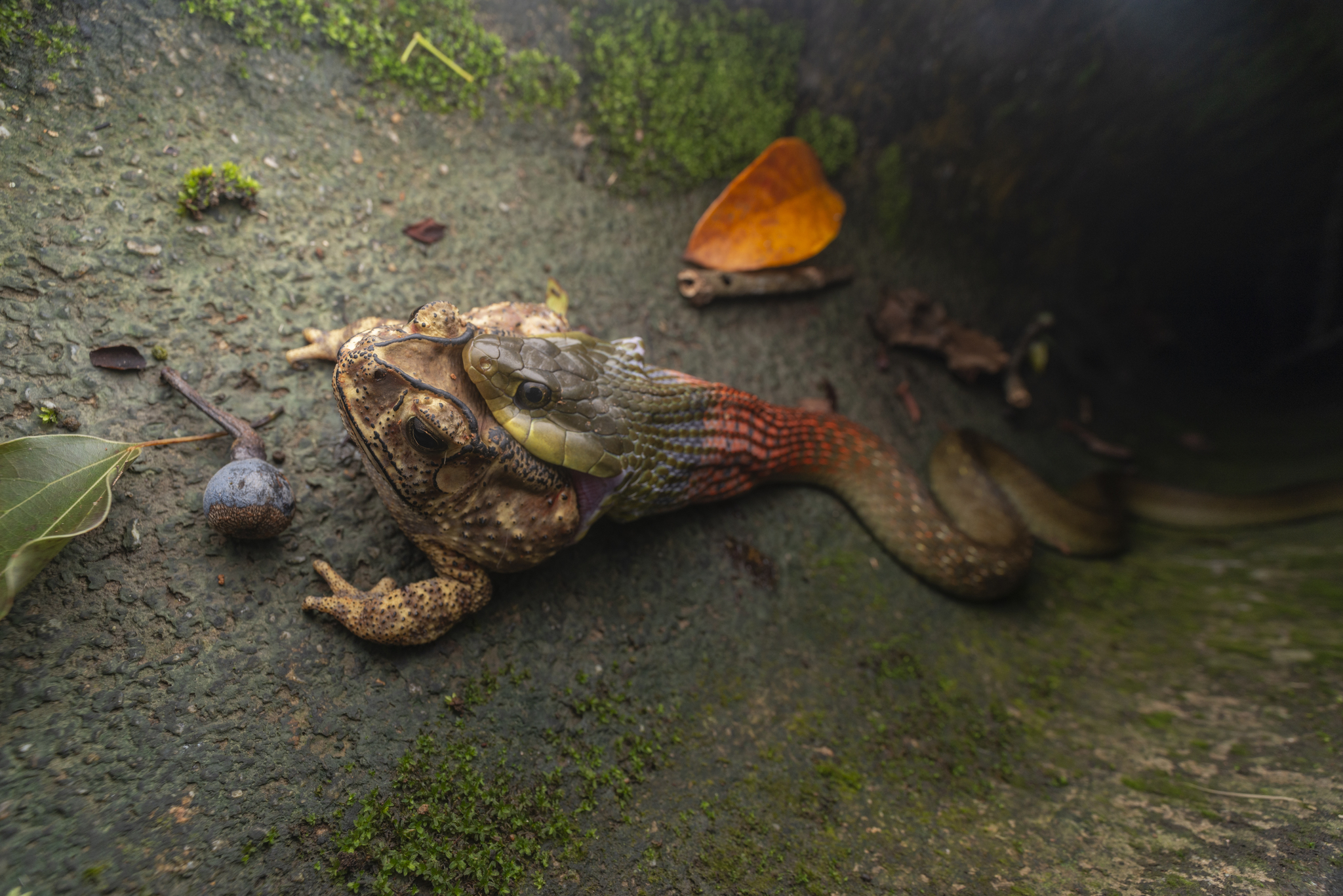
Eating an Asian common toad
