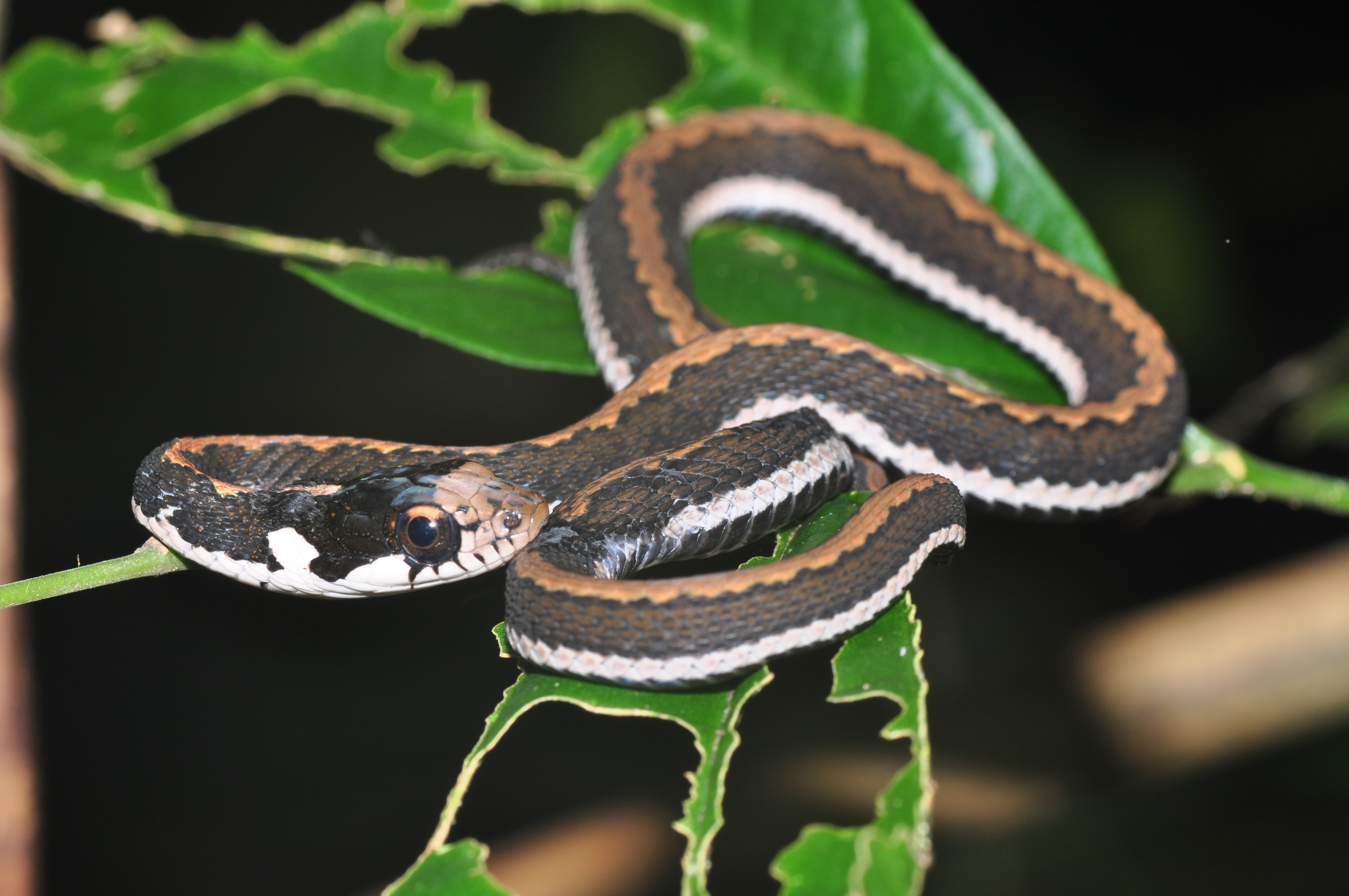

Conservation status
- Data Deficient (IUCN 3.1)

Scientific classification
- Kingdom: Animalia
- Phylum: Chordata
- Class: Reptilia
- Order: Squamata
- Suborder: Serpentes
- Family: Colubridae
- Genus: Rhabdophis
- Species: R. chrysargoides

Binomial name
- Rhabdophis chrysargoides (Günther, 1858)

Synonyms
- Tropidonotus chrysargoides Günther, 1858

= Rhabdophis chrysargoides =

Species of snake

Rhabdophis chrysargoides, commonly known as the Javanese keelback or Günther's keelback, is a keelback snake in the family Colubridae found in Java, Indonesia.
