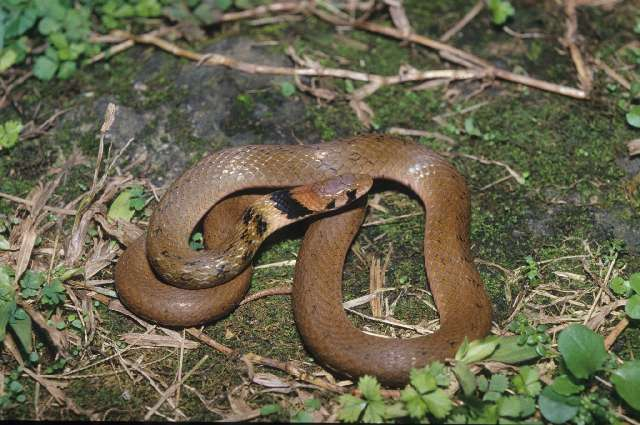

Conservation status
- Least Concern (IUCN 3.1)

Scientific classification
- Kingdom: Animalia
- Phylum: Chordata
- Class: Reptilia
- Order: Squamata
- Suborder: Serpentes
- Family: Colubridae
- Genus: Rhabdophis
- Species: R. swinhonis

Binomial name
- Rhabdophis swinhonis (Günther, 1868)

Synonyms
- Tropidonotus Swinhonis Günther, 1868; Tropidonotus swinhoei Boettger, 1888 (emendation); Natrix swinhonis — Stejneger, 1907; Rhabdophis swinhonis — Malnate, 1960

= Rhabdophis swinhonis =

Species of snake

Rhabdophis swinhonis is a species of snake in the subfamily Natricinae of the family Colubridae. The species is endemic to Taiwan. It is also known commonly as the Taiwan keelback and Swinhoe's grass snake.

== Etymology ==
The specific name, swinhonis, is in honour of Robert Swinhoe, a British diplomat and naturalist stationed in China in mid-19th century, who collected the holotype.

== Description ==
R. swinhonis can reach a maximum total length (including tail) of 70 cm (28 in). It has 15–17 rows of keeled dorsal scales. The head is oval, the body is moderately stout, and the tail is moderately long. The medium to large eye has a dark grey-brown iris and a round, jet black pupil surrounded by a grey ring. The body is dorsally dark grey-brown with ill-defined or fairly prominent square areas of black. The underside is cream to light grey and is mottled with deposits of coarse dark pigment. The head is uniform dark olive grey to olive brown above, while the sides are lighter. There is an oblique black band below the eye as well as a larger black band on the side of head, above the corner of mouth. The nape bears a distinct, thick, and black backward-pointing chevron. The anal scale is divided and the subcaudal scales are paired.

== Defensive behaviour ==
R. swinhonis is non-venomous and docile; when threatened it may expand its throat and neck transversely, but is unlikely to bite. It has nuchal glands that secrete a brown liquid; this may act as a predator deterrent, although its precise function remains unknown.

== Reproduction ==
Reproduction in R. swinhonis is through oviparity. Each clutch contains 6–15 eggs.

== Geographic range and habitat ==
R. swinhonis occurs throughout Taiwan at elevations of 500–1,000 m (1,600–3,300 ft) above sea level. It is a diurnal snake that lives on the forest floor, bushlands, and other humid environments. They also occur in agricultural fields.

== Diet ==
The main prey of R. swinhonis is frogs.

== Conservation ==
R. swinhonis is an uncommon species. It is not facing significant threats, occurs in protected areas, and enjoys Class III protection.
