= Rhabdophis confusus =

Scientific classification
- Kingdom: Animalia
- Phylum: Chordata
- Class: Reptilia
- Order: Squamata
- Suborder: Serpentes
- Family: Colubridae
- Genus: Rhabdophis
- Species: R. confusus

Binomial name
- Rhabdophis confusus David & Vogel, 2021

Species of snake

Rhabdophis confusus is a keelback snake in the family Colubridae found in China.
