= Rhabdophis murudensis =

Conservation status
- Least Concern (IUCN 3.1)

Scientific classification
- Kingdom: Animalia
- Phylum: Chordata
- Class: Reptilia
- Order: Squamata
- Suborder: Serpentes
- Family: Colubridae
- Genus: Rhabdophis
- Species: R. murudensis

Binomial name
- Rhabdophis murudensis (Smith, 1925)

Species of snake

Rhabdophis murudensis, the Muruden keelback or Gunung Murud keelback, is a keelback snake in the family Colubridae found in Malaysia,.
