= Rhabdophis callichroma =

Conservation status
- Data Deficient (IUCN 3.1)

Scientific classification
- Kingdom: Animalia
- Phylum: Chordata
- Class: Reptilia
- Order: Squamata
- Suborder: Serpentes
- Family: Colubridae
- Genus: Rhabdophis
- Species: R. callichroma

Binomial name
- Rhabdophis callichroma (Bourret, 1934)

Species of snake

Rhabdophis callichroma, the Bavi keelback, is a keelback snake in the family Colubridae found in Vietnam and China.
