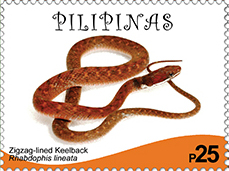

Conservation status
- Least Concern (IUCN 3.1)

Scientific classification
- Kingdom: Animalia
- Phylum: Chordata
- Class: Reptilia
- Order: Squamata
- Suborder: Serpentes
- Family: Colubridae
- Genus: Rhabdophis
- Species: R. lineatus

Binomial name
- Rhabdophis lineatus (Peters, 1861)

= Rhabdophis lineatus =

Species of snake

Rhabdophis lineatus, the zigzag-lined water snake, is a keelback snake in the family Colubridae found in the Philippines.
