= Rhabdophis flaviceps =

Conservation status
- Least Concern (IUCN 3.1)

Scientific classification
- Kingdom: Animalia
- Phylum: Chordata
- Class: Reptilia
- Order: Squamata
- Suborder: Serpentes
- Family: Colubridae
- Genus: Rhabdophis
- Species: R. flaviceps

Binomial name
- Rhabdophis flaviceps (Duméril, Bibron & Duméril, 1854)

Synonyms
- Macropisthodon flaviceps Duméril, Bibron & Duméril, 1854; Amphiesma flaviceps Duméril, Bibron & Duméril, 1854; Amphiesma lindmani Bleeker, 1857; Amphiesma rufo torquatum Edeling, 1864; Tropidonotus leucomelas Günther, 1864; Amphiesma lindmanni Günther, 1872; Tropidonotus flaviceps Boettger, 1886; Tropidonotus (Amphiesma) flaviceps Boettger, 1887

Species of snake

Rhabdophis flaviceps, the orangeneck keelback, orange-lipped keelback, or yellow-headed keelback, is a species of snake in the family Colubridae. It is found in Indonesia, Thailand and Malaysia.
