= Rhabdophis hmongorum =

H'mong keelback snake

Scientific classification
- Domain: Eukaryota
- Kingdom: Animalia
- Phylum: Chordata
- Class: Reptilia
- Order: Squamata
- Suborder: Serpentes
- Family: Colubridae
- Genus: Rhabdophis
- Species: R. hmongorum

Binomial name
- Rhabdophis hmongorum Kane, Tapley, La & Nguyen, 2023

Species of snake

Rhabdophis hmongorum, also known as the H'mong keelback snake, is a species of colubrid snake. It was discovered on Mount Fansipan in Vietnam.

== Discovery ==
The snake was found in a dry stream on Mt. Fansipan, about 257.5 km (257,500 m) northwest of Hanoi.

== Description ==
The snake was described as "metallic purple", and has an iridescent underbelly. It is around 50.8 cm (20.0 in) in length.

== Range ==
It is possible that the snake's range may cross Vietnam's border into China, but there is not enough evidence to support this claim.
