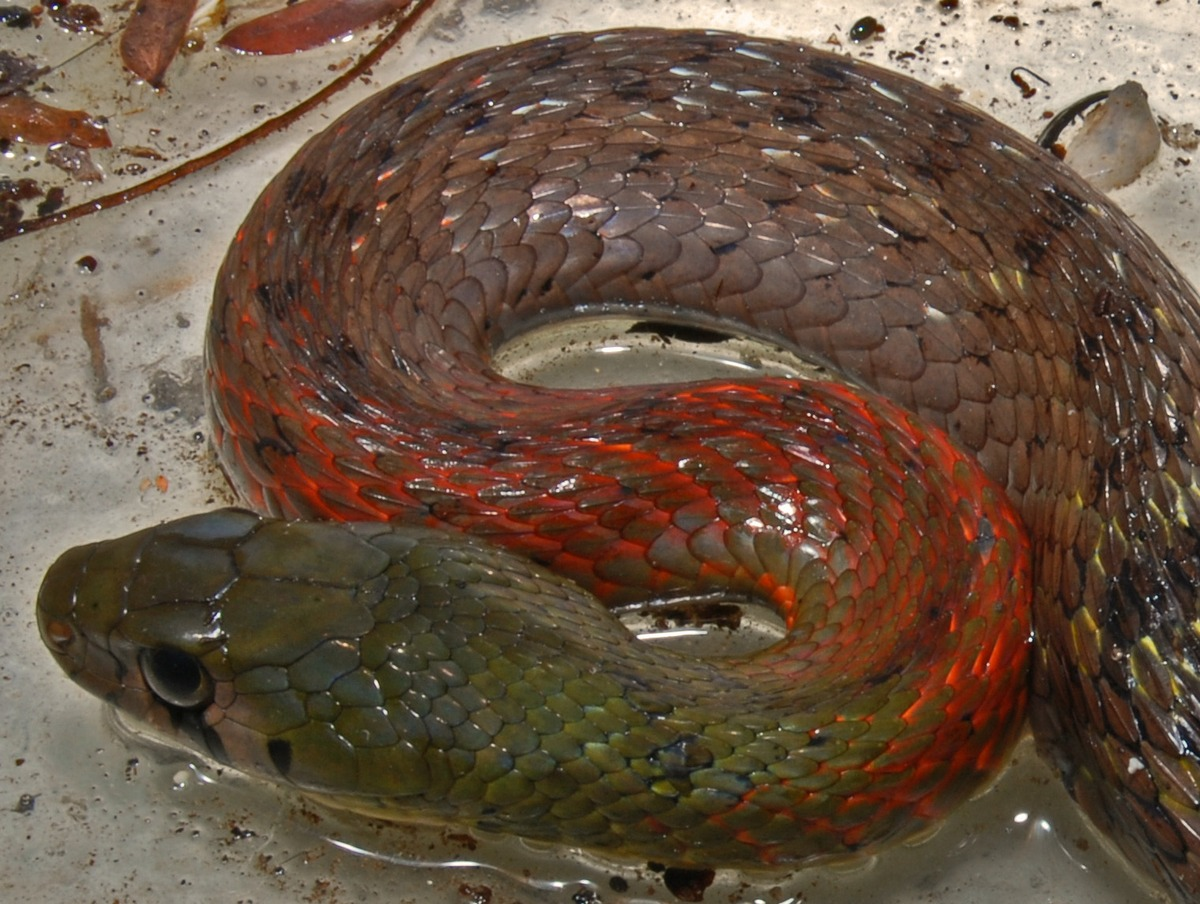
- In Java

Conservation status
- Least Concern (IUCN 3.1)

Scientific classification
- Kingdom: Animalia
- Phylum: Chordata
- Class: Reptilia
- Order: Squamata
- Suborder: Serpentes
- Family: Colubridae
- Genus: Rhabdophis
- Species: R. subminiatus

Binomial name
- Rhabdophis subminiatus (Schlegel, 1837)

Synonyms
- List: Tropidonotus subminiatus Schlegel, 1837; Amphiesma subminiatum — A.M.C. Duméril, Bibron & A.H.A. Duméril, 1854; Natrix subminiata — Barbour, 1912; Rhabdophis subminiatus — Bourret, 1936

= Rhabdophis subminiatus =

Species of snake

Rhabdophis subminiatus, commonly called the red-necked keelback or red-necked keelback snake, is a species of venomous snake in the subfamily Natricinae of the family Colubridae. Unusual for colubrids, it is venomous.

== Etymology ==
The specific name subminiatus refers to the typical reddish coloration ("miniatus" = "scarlet, vermilion"), which may be limited to the neck, or more extensive (e.g., photo at left). The subspecific name, helleri, is in honor of American zoologist Edmund Heller.

== Geographic range ==
Rhabdophis subminiatus is restricted to the Indonesian islands of Java and Sumatra. Historically the species was considered to have a much wider distribution, but this changed when it was realized that the species was actually a species complex.

== Description ==
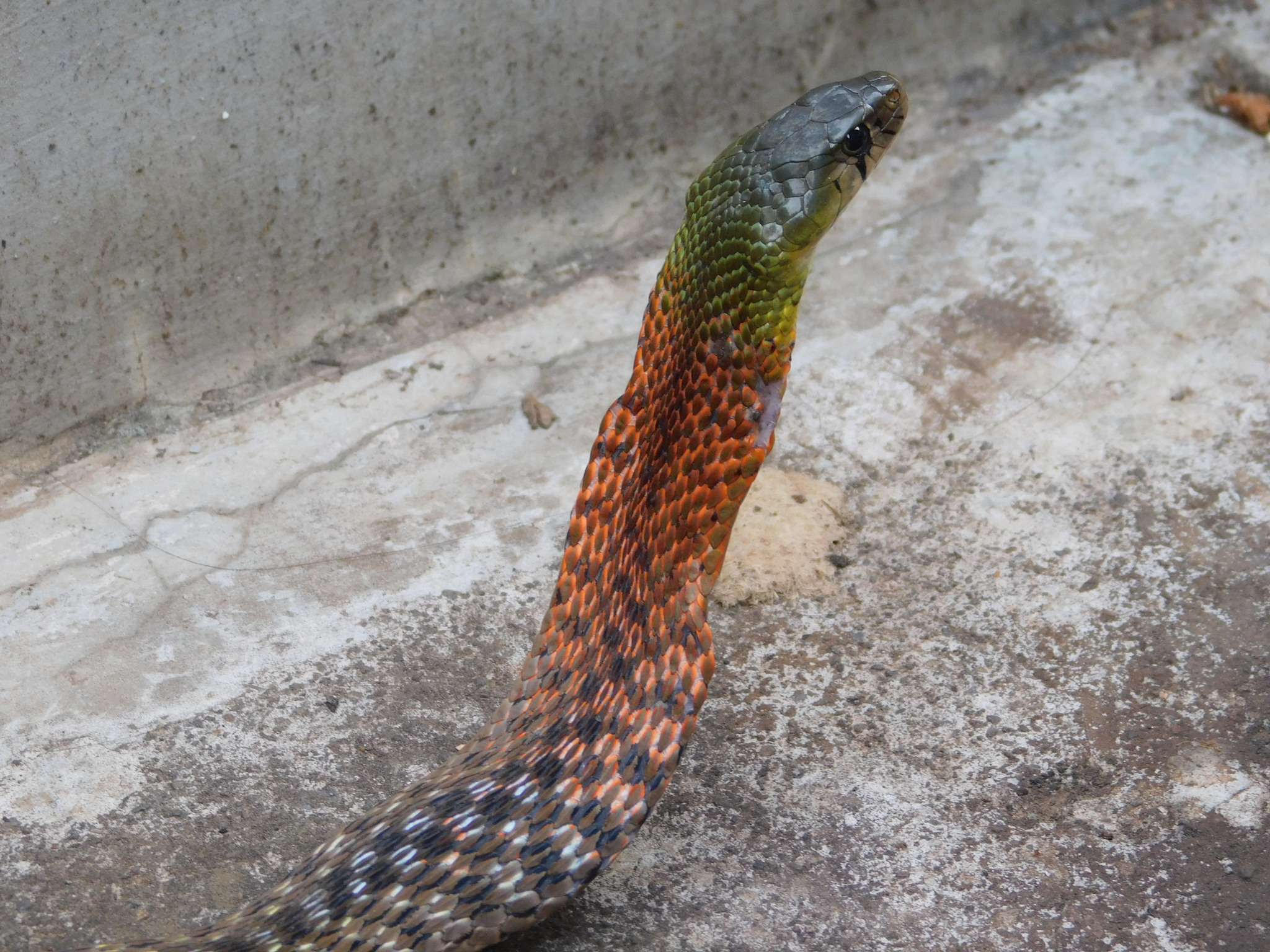
In Java

Rhabdophis subminiatus has a greenish hue with red and yellow regions near the head. It grows to 70 to 90 cm (27.5 to 35.5 in) in total length (including tail). Female is much larger than male. During mating, multiple males may swarm a single female.

== Habitat and diet ==
The red-necked keelback generally lives near ponds, where it consumes frogs, fish, lizards and small mammals.

== Venom and poison ==
Rhabdophis subminiatus is a rear-fanged species and was previously thought to be harmless. However, following one fatal and several near-fatal envenomations, the toxicity of its venom was investigated. As a result, it has recently been reclassified as a dangerous species. In general, rear-fanged snakes need to bite and hold on, or repeatedly bite, to have any effect on humans. But recently, there have been reports of cases where even brief bites have resulted in severe envenomation and organ failure, affecting the kidneys and liver. A chewing action facilitates envenomation, as the venom ducts open to fangs that are externally grooved (not hollow) and are posterior in the oral cavity. R. subminiatus has enlarged and ungrooved teeth. The species has two enlarged teeth in the back of the jaw. Located in the upper jaw is a gland known as Duvernoy's gland, which produces an extremely venomous secretion.

=== Symptoms caused by venom and poison ===
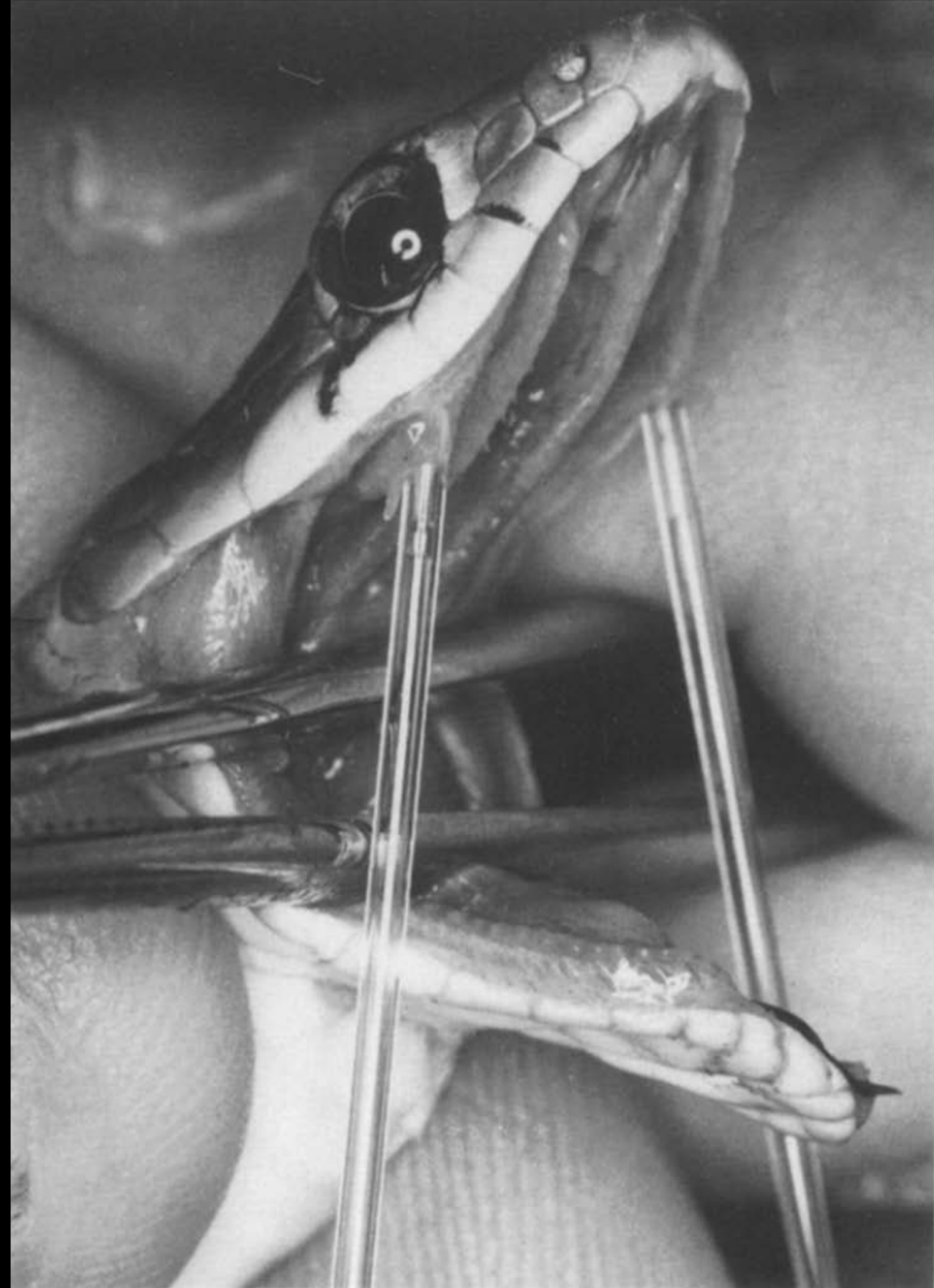
Extraction of venom from the red-necked keelback

When the snake bites, the salivary venom mixture is not injected, but it flows into the punctures produced by the upper jaw's rear teeth, which can penetrate the skin of humans. The venom from R. subminiatus has been responsible for internal hemorrhaging, including hemorrhaging of the brain, as well as nausea, coagulopathy, and even disseminated intravascular coagulation. Also, when the venom was tested on animals, kidney failure was reported. Caution should be taken when dealing with patients who have been bitten by the red-necked keelback snake. No further injury such as injections should be used because this may cause excessive bleeding in the bite victim. Although most bites of humans from R. subminiatus involve the front teeth and do not cause adverse effects, rare bites from the rear fangs can be lethal. Studies in mice on the biological activity of the venom of the red-necked keel-back snake, Rhabdophis subminiatus, showed that the venom contained a potent factor X activator and had intense defibrinogenating activity; the overall proteolytic activity of the venom was low, and this correlated well with its negligible fibrinogenolytic and fibrinolytic activities. Only one antivenom tested was shown to have weak neutralizing activity against the venom in mice. This species of snake has recently been added to the schedule of the Dangerous Wild Animals Act, 1976.

The snake consumes poisonous toads as part of its diet. It stores the bufotoxins from the consumed toads in its nuchal glands located at the red colorful region of the neck of the snake. Bufotoxins induce tachycardia, drooling, convulsions, and finally paralysis. When threatened such as by touching, the snake can burst its nuchal glands, releasing the stored toxin.
