= Rhabdophis ceylonensis =

Conservation status
- Endangered (IUCN 3.1)

Scientific classification
- Kingdom: Animalia
- Phylum: Chordata
- Class: Reptilia
- Order: Squamata
- Suborder: Serpentes
- Family: Colubridae
- Genus: Rhabdophis
- Species: R. ceylonensis

Binomial name
- Rhabdophis ceylonensis (Günther, 1858)

Synonyms
- Tropidonotus chrysargus Var. ceylonensis Günther, 1858; Tropidonotus ceylonensis — Günther, 1864; Rhabdophis ceylonensis — Wall, 1921; Amphiesma ceylonensis — Wall, 1921; Balanophis ceylonensis — M.A. Smith, 1943

Species of snake

Rhabdophis ceylonensis is endemic to the island of Sri Lanka. The species is commonly known as the Sri Lanka blossom krait, the Sri Lanka keelback, and මල් කරවලා (mal karawala) or නිහලුවා (nihaluwa) in Sinhala. It is a moderately venomous snake.

== Distribution and habitat ==
Rhabdophis ceylonensis is a poorly-known snake from wet forests and some parts of intermediate forests in the lowlands and midhills of Sri Lanka.

== Scalation ==
R. ceylonensis has dorsal scales in 19 rows at midbody. The ventrals number 131-141, the anal scale is divided, and the subcaudals number 40-54.

== Ecology ==
R. ceylonensis is a slow-moving snake. When threatened, it raises the anterior part of its body, which it inflates to expose the red skin between the dorsal scales on its neck. Its diet consists of frogs, while hatchlings are known to eat orthopterans.

== Reproduction ==
R. ceylonensis is oviparous. About 7 eggs are produced at a time, measuring 19-22 × 9.5-13.2mm (about .75 x .5 inch). They hatch in March to produce young measuring about 102 mm (4.0 in) including tail.

== Description ==
R. ceylonensis has a head distinct from the neck. The eye is large, with a round pupil. Its dorsal side is olive-brown in color, with black cross-bars that enclose a series of large yellow or red black-edged spots. Its interstitial skin is red. Nuchal glands extend along the anterior part of the body to the 15th ventral.

== Venom ==
R. ceylonensis possesses a venom, and has been known to inflict life-threatening bites (termed, Hazard Level 1). Although it does not have hollow fangs in the front of the upper jaw, it does have two enlarged, curved, grooved teeth at the rear of each upper jaw.
