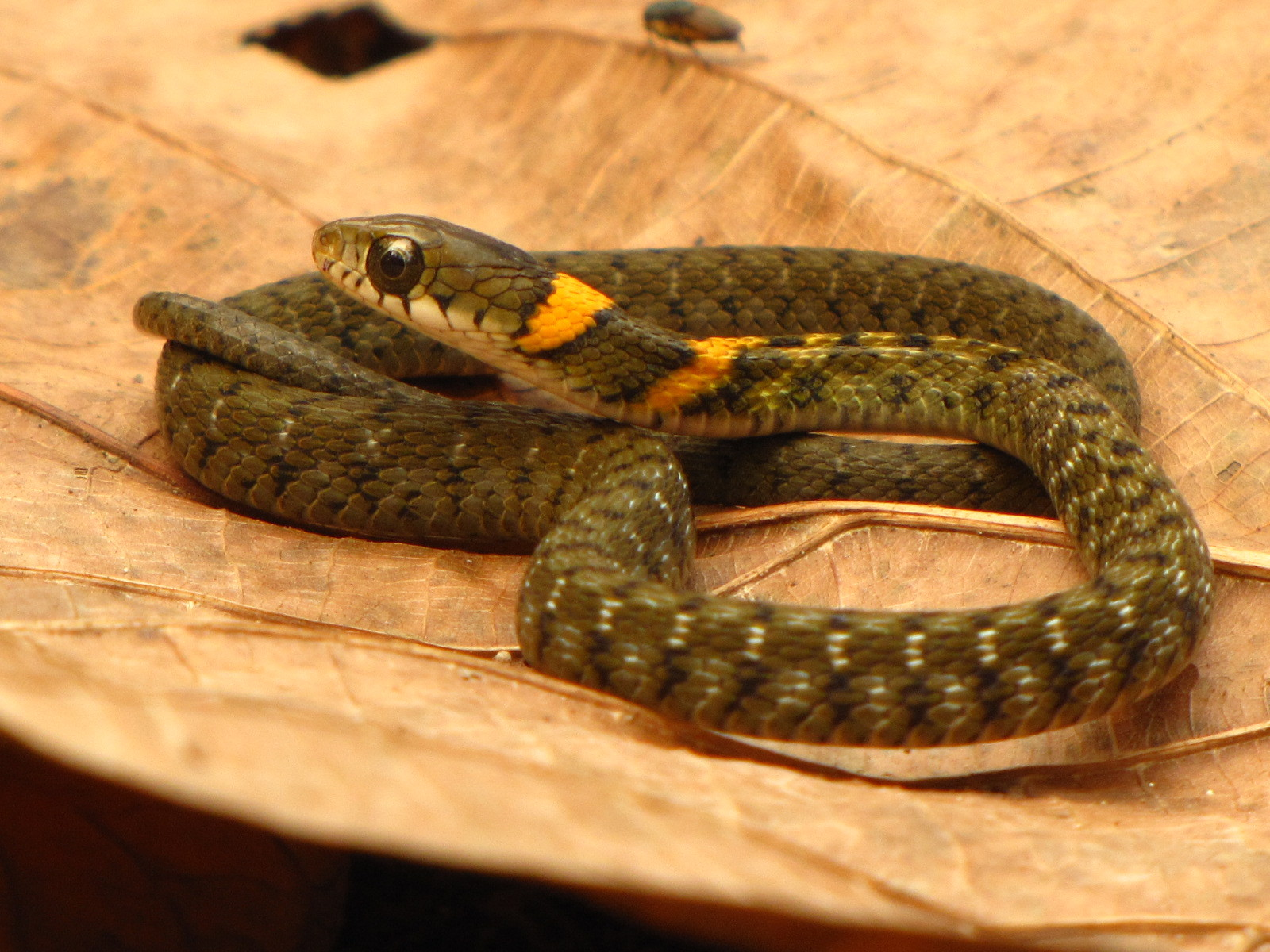

Conservation status
- Least Concern (IUCN 3.1)

Scientific classification
- Kingdom: Animalia
- Phylum: Chordata
- Class: Reptilia
- Order: Squamata
- Suborder: Serpentes
- Family: Colubridae
- Genus: Rhabdophis
- Species: R. himalayanus

Binomial name
- Rhabdophis himalayanus (Günther, 1864)

Synonyms
- Tropidonotus himalayanus Günther, 1864; Macropisthodon himalayanus Annandale, 1905; Rhabdophis himalayanus Wall, 1923; Natrix himalayanus Smith, 1938; Rhabdophis himalayana Sharma, 2004

= Rhabdophis himalayanus =

Species of snake

The orange-collared keelback (Rhabdophis himalayanus) is a species of snake. As with its congenerics, this is a reared-fanged species. The toxicity of its venom is not known, but it overpowers its prey quickly. Even if it is considered harmless, an allergic reaction from the bite can still occur, and all bites should be taken seriously.

== Description ==
Dorsally it is olive with small dark spots and two longitudinal series of small whitish spots or narrow crossbars. Behind the head there is an orange or yellow collar, usually interrupted on the midline, followed by a blackish blotch on the nape. The upper labials are yellowish with black sutures. Ventrally it is yellowish, speckled with brown or black, or entirely grayish olive or blackish. It may attain 83 cm (33 inches) in total length, tail 20 cm (8 inches).

== Distribution ==
India (Sikkim, Assam; Arunachal Pradesh (Siddi (=Gandhigram), Miao - Changlang district, Chimpu, Itanagar - Papum Pare district, Pasighat, Boleng - East Siang district) ), Mizoram (Lunglei, Serkawn @DIET Practising School CAMPUS) Bhutan, Bangladesh, Nepal, N Myanmar (Burma), China (Yunnan, Yizang/Tibet).

Type locality: "Nepal"
