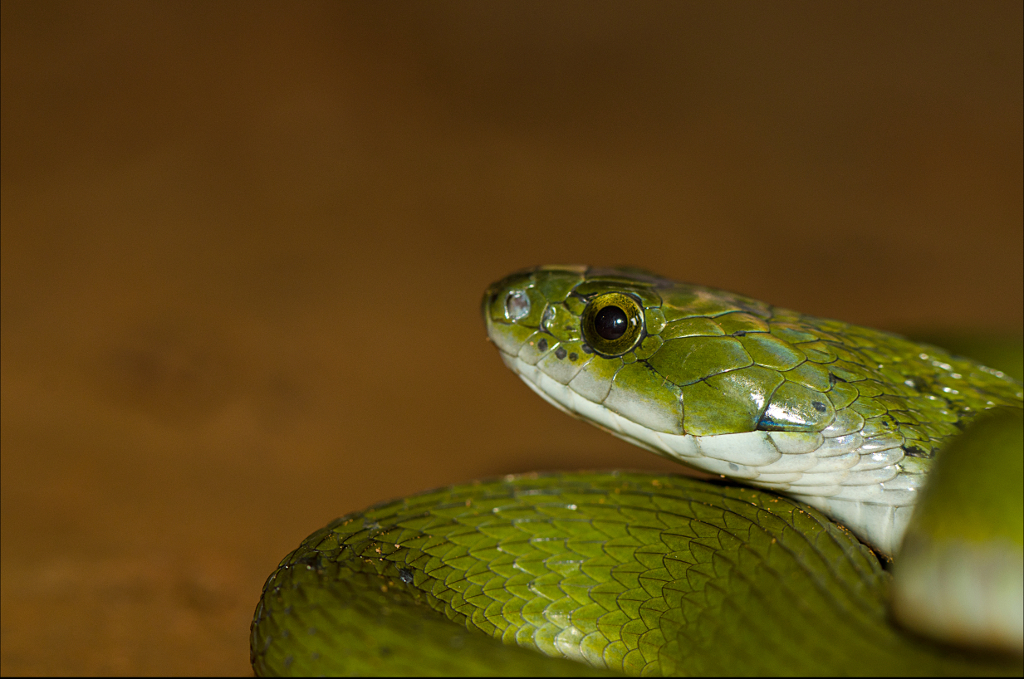

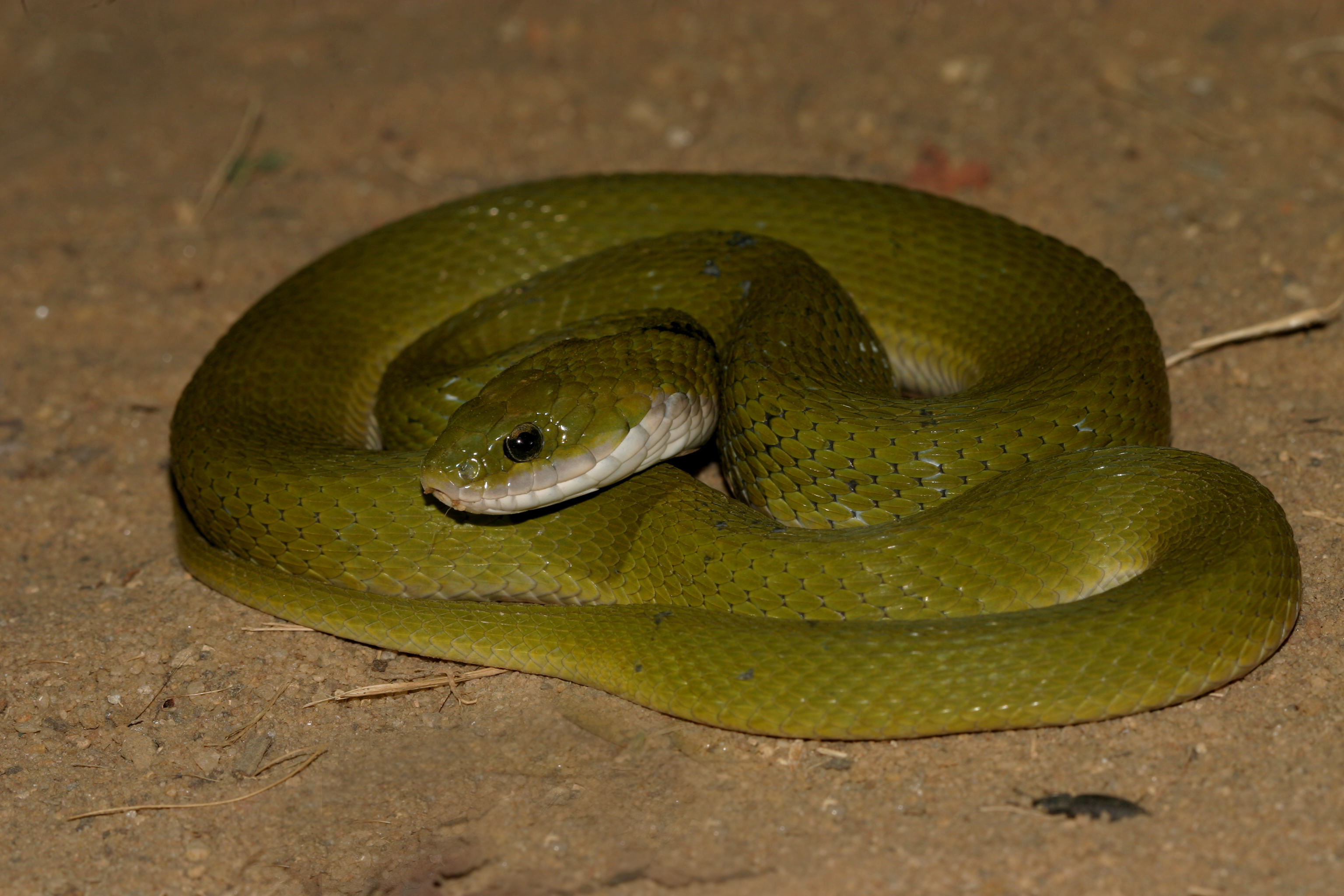

Conservation status
- Least Concern (IUCN 3.1)

Scientific classification
- Kingdom: Animalia
- Phylum: Chordata
- Class: Reptilia
- Order: Squamata
- Suborder: Serpentes
- Family: Colubridae
- Genus: Rhabdophis
- Species: R. plumbicolor

Binomial name
- Rhabdophis plumbicolor (Cantor, 1839)

Synonyms
- Tropidonotus plumbicolor Cantor, 1839; Macropisthodon plumbicolor — Boulenger, 1893

= Rhabdophis plumbicolor =

Green keelback

Species of snake

Rhabdophis plumbicolor, known as the green keelback or lead keelback, is a species of nonvenomous snake in the family Colubridae native to parts of the Indian subcontinent.

== Description ==
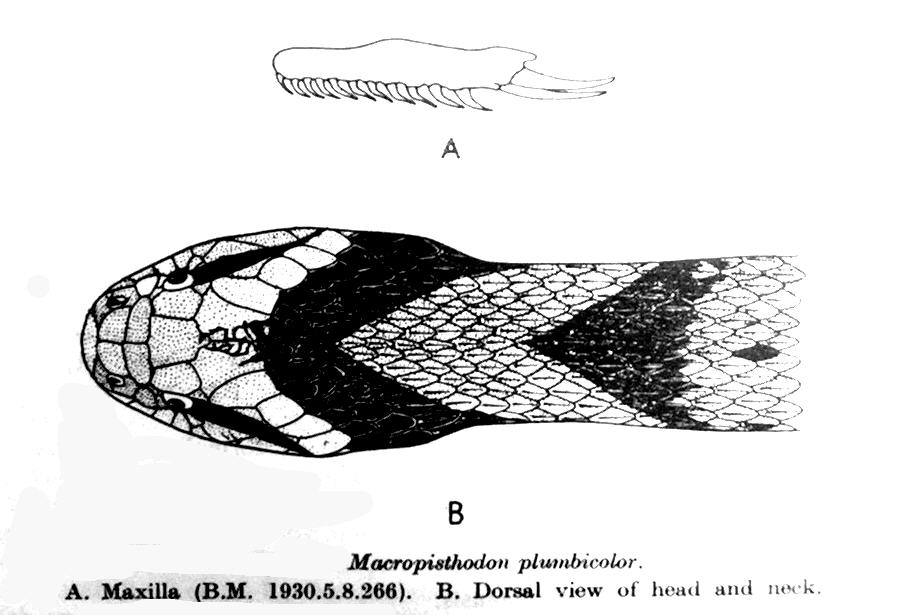
Illustration of the scale pattern on a juvenile

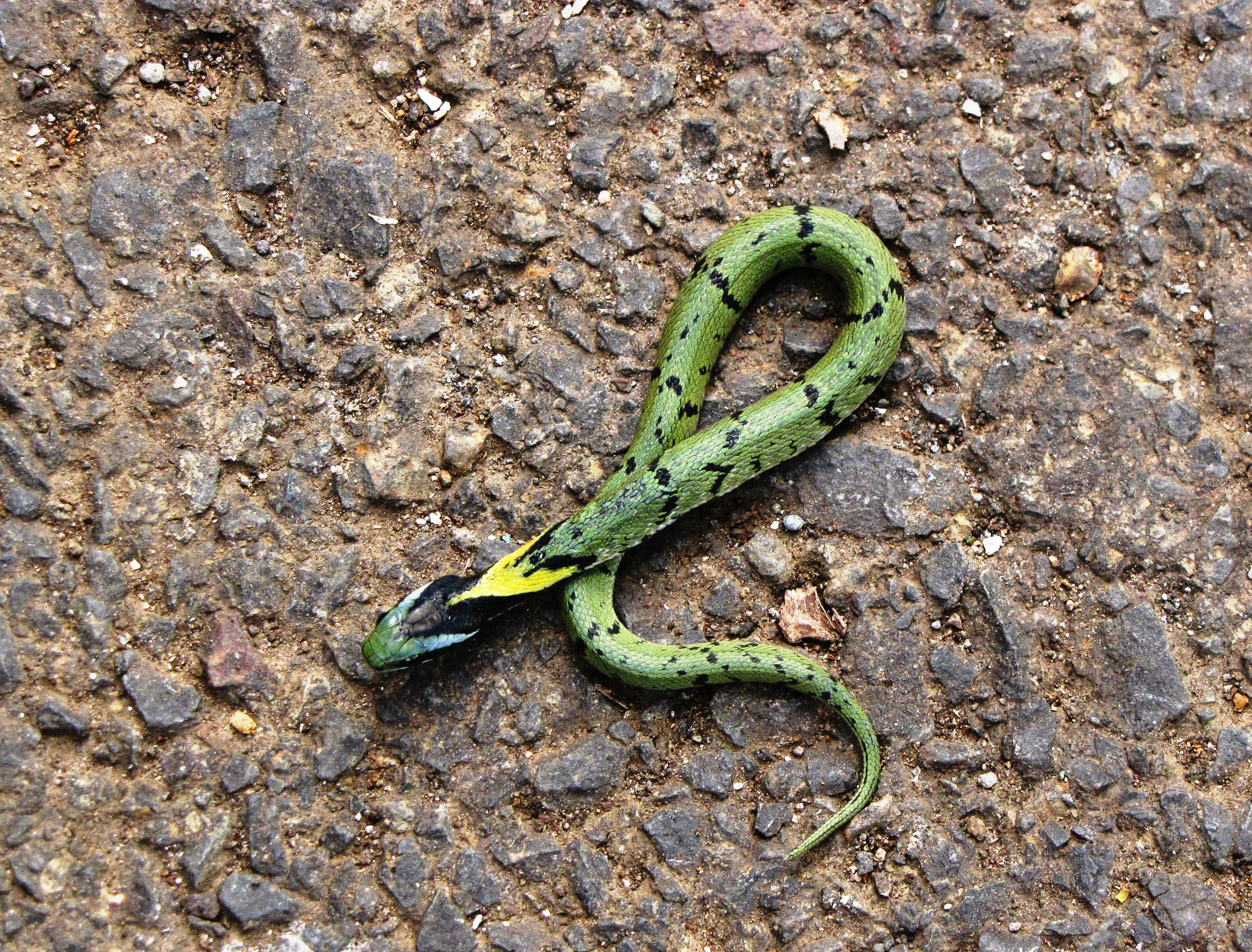
Juvenile green keelback in Pune, India

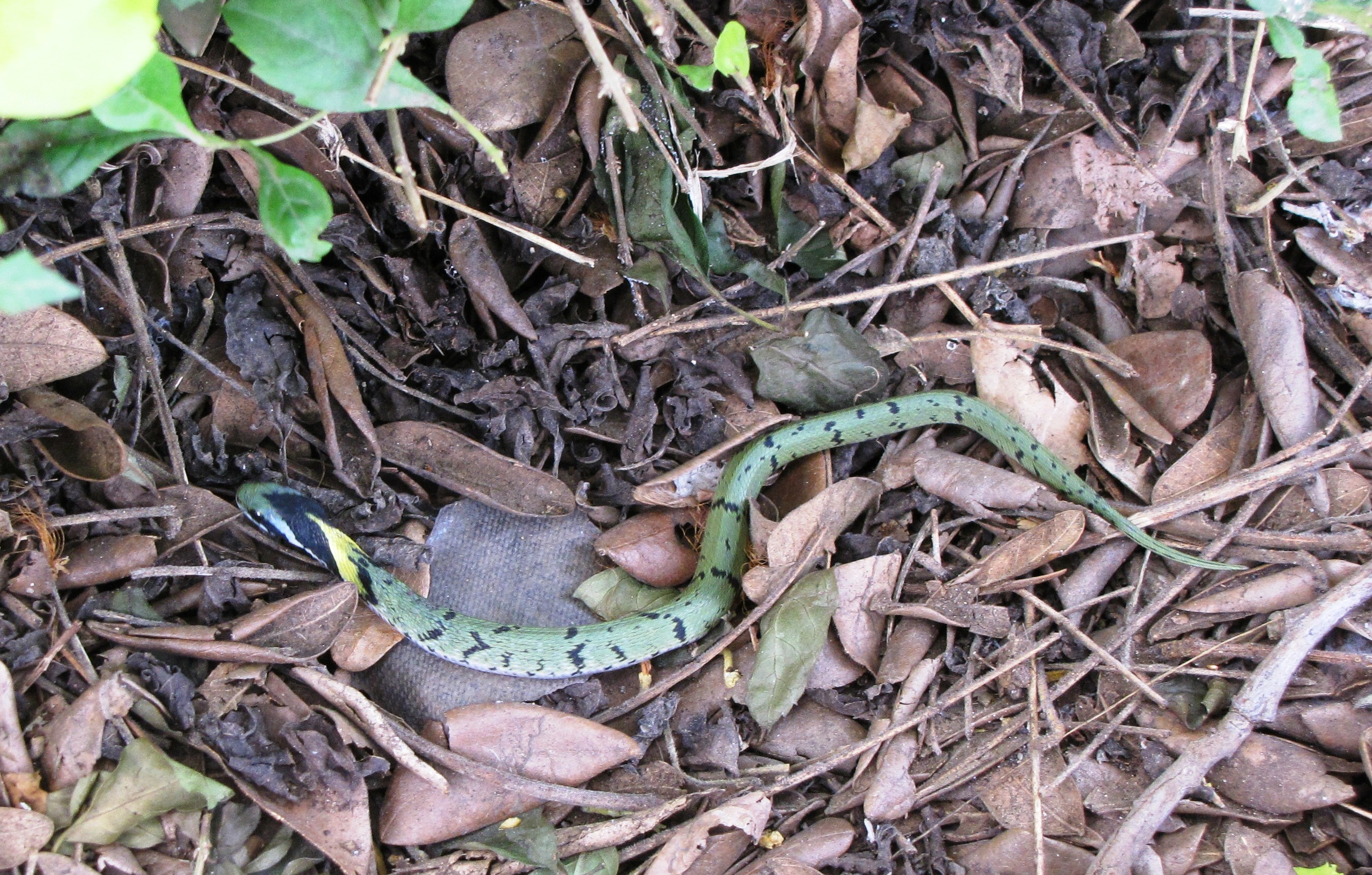
Juvenile green keelback in the wild

R. plumbicolor is stout and viper-like in body structure, and about 2 ft (61 cm) in total length including tail when fully grown. The eye is moderately large. The rostral scale is just visible from above. The suture between the internasals is as long as that between the prefrontals or a little shorter. The frontal scale is as long as its distance from the end of the snout or a little longer, as long as the parietals or a little shorter. The loreal scale is as long as deep or deeper, sometimes touching the eye. There are two preoculars scales and three or four postoculars. The temporals are 2 + 3 or 4. There are 7 scales on the upper lip, the third and fourth touch the eye; and 4 or 5 lower labials in contact with the anterior chin-shields, which are shorter than the posterior. The dorsal scaless are strongly keeled, in 23 to 27 rows at midbody. The ventrals scutes are 144-160 in number, and the anal is usually divided. The subcaudal scales are 35-50 in number. R. plumbicolor is dull green above, uniform or with traces of black markings. Young individuals show an inverted black V-mark on the neck, its apex forwards, reaching to the frontal shield, and a second much smaller one behind, the intervening space being bright yellow or orange; a black stripe from the eye to the angle of the month, and more or less regular transverse spots or cross-bars on the back and tail; belly whitish, yellow or plumbeous, rarely with darkish spots.

== Behavior ==
In disposition R. plumbicolor is very gentle, and in threat may flatten the neck and raise the head like a cobra while other specimens may flatten the entire body on the ground.

== Diet ==
R. plumbicolor feeds mainly on toads.

== Distribution and habitat ==
R. plumbicolor is distributed in peninsular India and Sri Lanka especially in hilly landscapes. A large specimen was found at an elevation of 4,700 ft (1,400 m) in the Anaimalai Hills by William Ruxton Davison. It also occurs in Pune, Maharashtra, Bangladesh, Myanmar, and possibly Pakistan.

== Reproduction ==
R. plumbicolor is oviparous.

== Subspecies ==
Two subspecies are recognized as being valid, including the nominotypical subspecies.

- Rhabdophis plumbicolor palabariya Deraniyagala, 1955 – Sri Lanka
- Rhabdophis plumbicolor plumbicolor (Cantor, 1839) – Asian mainland
