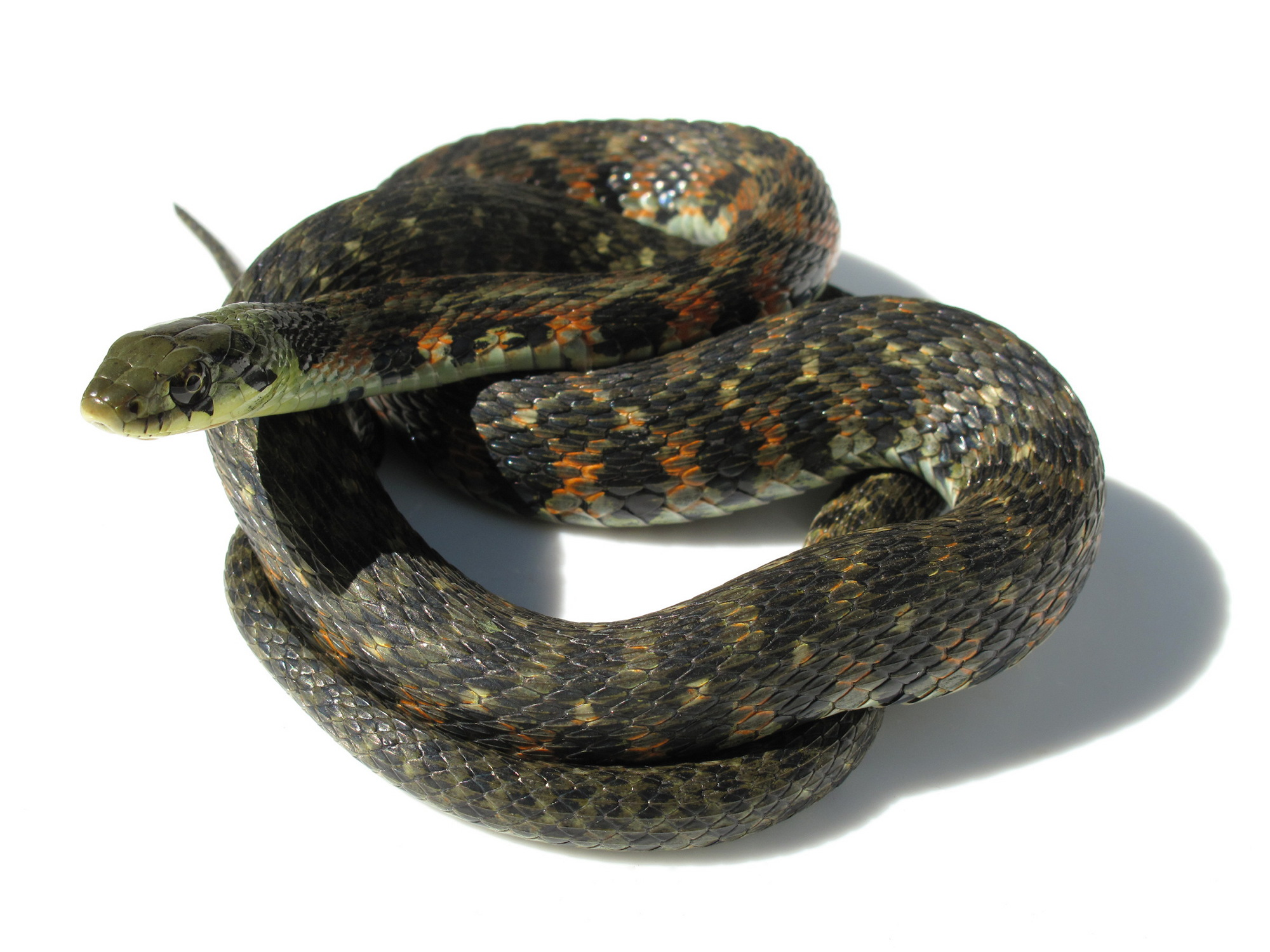

Conservation status
- Least Concern (IUCN 3.1)

Scientific classification
- Kingdom: Animalia
- Phylum: Chordata
- Class: Reptilia
- Order: Squamata
- Suborder: Serpentes
- Family: Colubridae
- Genus: Rhabdophis
- Species: R. tigrinus

Binomial name
- Rhabdophis tigrinus (H. Boie, 1826)
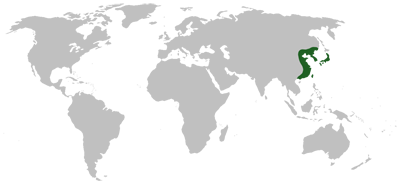
- Range of R. tigrinus

Synonyms
- Tropidonotus tigrinus H. Boie, 1826; Amphiesma tigrinum — A.M.C. Duméril, Bibron & A.H.A. Duméril, 1854; Tropidonotus lateralis Berthold, 1859; Amphiesma tigrinum — Hallowell, 1860; Tropidonotus orientalis Günther, 1862; Tropidonotus tigrinus — Günther, 1888; Tropidonotus tigrinus — Boulenger, 1893; Tropidonotus tigrinus — Boulenger, 1896; Natrix tigrina — Stejneger, 1907; Natrix tigrina lateralis — Stejneger, 1907; Natrix tigrina formosana Maki, 1931; Natrix tigrina lateralis — Glass, 1946; Natrix tigrina — Alexander & Diener, 1958; Rhabdophis tigrina — Malnate, 1960; Rhabdophis tigrina lateralis — Zhao & Jiang, 1986; Rhabdophis tigrinus formosanus — Ota & Mori, 1985

= Rhabdophis tigrinus =

Species of snake

Rhabdophis tigrinus, also known commonly as the tiger keelback, yamakagashi, or kkotbaem, is a species of venomous snake in the subfamily Natricinae of the family Colubridae. The species is native to East Asia and Southeast Asia. Many sources, though not ITIS, recognize one subspecies, Rhabdophis tigrinus formosanus of Taiwan.

== Description ==
The dorsal color pattern of R. tigrinus is olive-drab green, with black and bright orange crossbars or spots from the neck down the first third of the body. The belly is whitish. The average total length (including tail) is usually 60–100 cm (24–39 in).

== Geographic range ==
R. tigrinus is found in eastern Russia (Primorskiy and Khabarovsk territories), North and South Korea, China (widespread, except in the western third and the extreme south; Zhejiang, Fujian, Jiangxi, Hubei, Guizhou, Sichuan, Gansu, Shaanxi and Inner Mongolia), on the island of Taiwan, in Vietnam and in Japan (Yakushima, Tanegashima, Kyūshū, Shikoku, Honshu, Osaka and in the Ryukyu Islands). The type locality given is "Japan".

== Diet ==
The diet of R. tigrinus consists mainly of small vertebrates, especially frogs and toads. It forages using both chemical (smell/tongue) and visual cues to find its prey. Rhabdophis tigrinus has specialized nuchal glands on the back of the neck that are used to store cardiotonic steroids (bufadienolides) sequestered from the toads in their diet. Rhabdophis tigrinus are resistant to the toxic effects of these chemicals. This is different from their venom, which is produced in oral glands and is not known to contain bufadienolides or other sequestered toxins. Female Rhabdophis tigrinus can pass sequestered chemicals to their offspring, both by deposition in egg yolk and by transfer across the egg membranes within the oviduct, late in gestation.

== Defensive behavior ==
Rhabdophis tigrinus has two rows of glands in its neck that provide protection from predators by releasing steroidal toxins that are sequestered from ingested poisonous toads, referred to as kleptotoxisism. When this species is challenged at cooler temperatures it tends to demonstrate passive anti-predator responses such as flattening the neck and body and lying still, while at higher temperatures it more frequently flees instead. This snake thus appears to rely more heavily on the deterrence provided by these glands at low ambient temperatures. Although venomous, few deaths have been recorded due to its tendency to display one of these other behaviors as opposed to striking. This hesitancy to strike at a predator in turn may be because its fangs are located in the back of the mouth, making a successful strike on a large object difficult.
