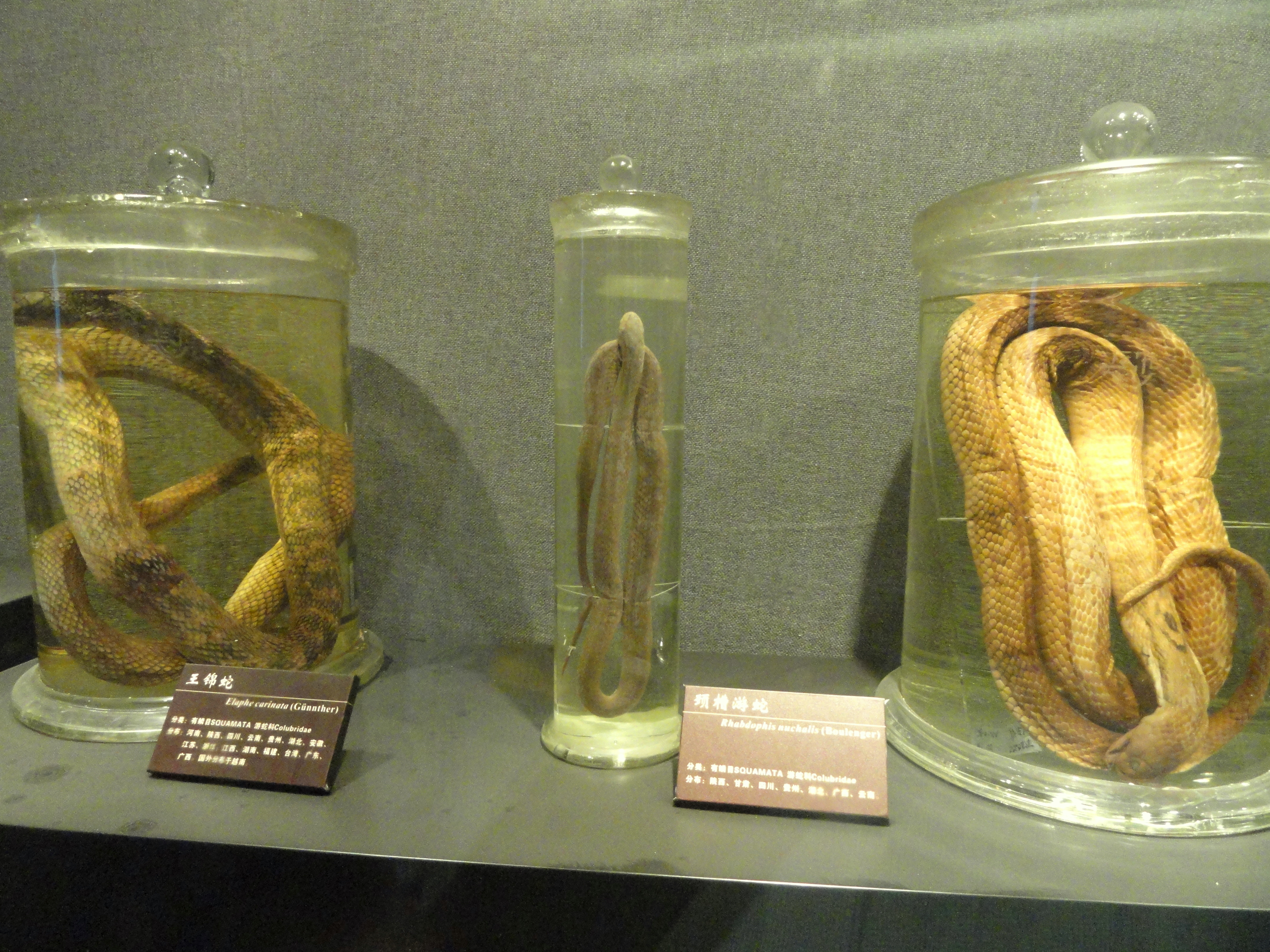

Conservation status
- Least Concern (IUCN 3.1)

Scientific classification
- Kingdom: Animalia
- Phylum: Chordata
- Class: Reptilia
- Order: Squamata
- Suborder: Serpentes
- Family: Colubridae
- Genus: Rhabdophis
- Species: R. nuchalis

Binomial name
- Rhabdophis nuchalis (Boulenger, 1891)

Synonyms
- Tropidonotus nuchalis Boulenger, 1891; Natrix nivalis Schmidt, 1925; Tropidonotus nuchalis var. collaris Vogt, 1927; Rhabdophis pentasupralabialis Jiang & Zhao, 1983

= Rhabdophis nuchalis =

Species of snake

Rhabdophis nuchalis, commonly known as the Hubei keelback, is a venomous keelback snake in the family Colubridae found in northeast India, Myanmar, China, and Vietnam.
