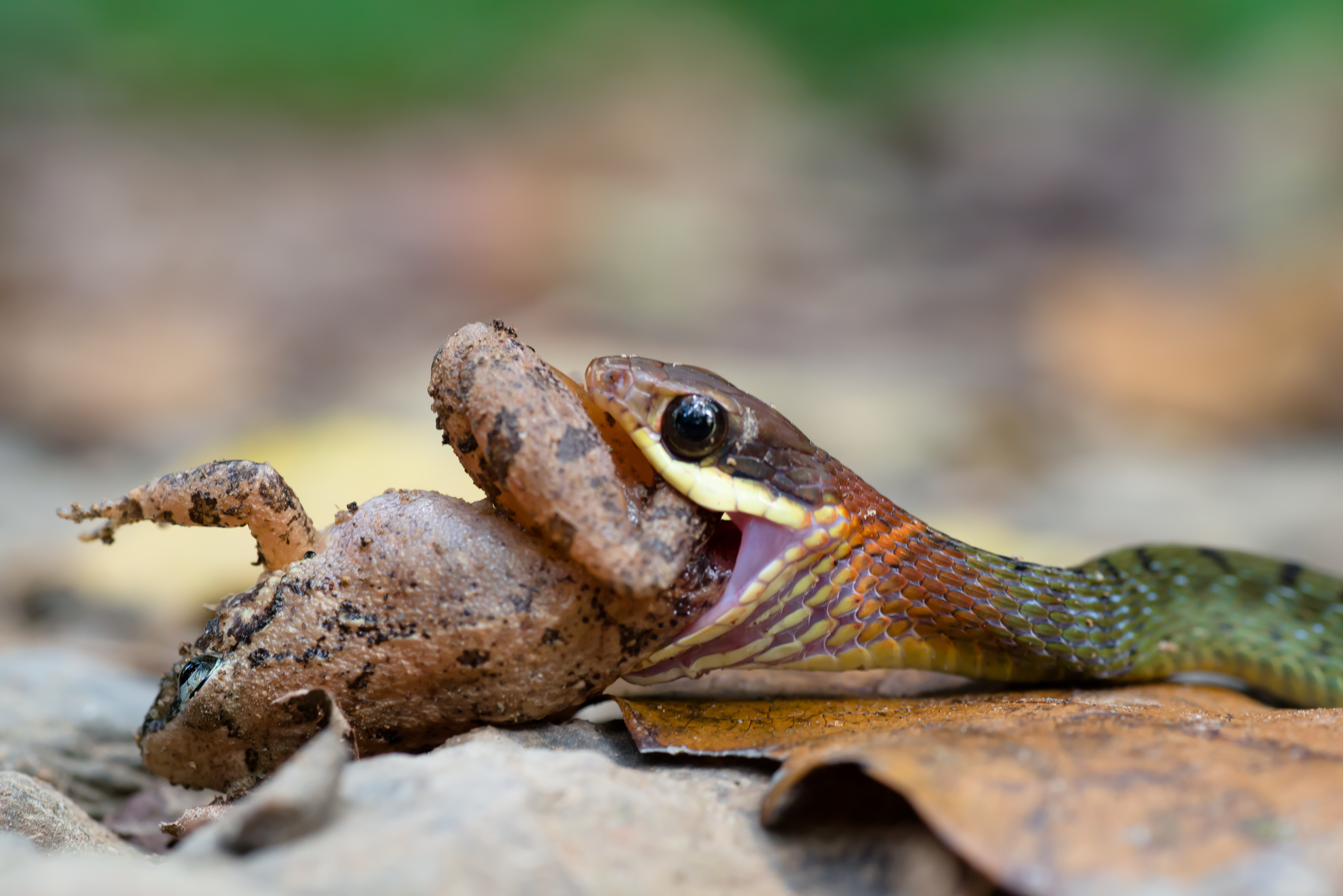
- Specklebelly keelback

Conservation status
- Least Concern (IUCN 3.1)

Scientific classification
- Kingdom: Animalia
- Phylum: Chordata
- Class: Reptilia
- Order: Squamata
- Suborder: Serpentes
- Family: Colubridae
- Genus: Rhabdophis
- Species: R. chrysargos

Binomial name
- Rhabdophis chrysargos (Schlegel, 1837)

= Rhabdophis chrysargos =

Species of snake

The specklebelly keelback (Rhabdophis chrysargos) is a species of colubrid snake found in southeast Asia.

- Food: Lizards, small mammals and birds
- Size: Up to 600 mm
- Distribution: the Philippines (Palawan), Borneo, Sumatra, Java, Bali
- Habitat: Various forest
- Venom: Harmless
