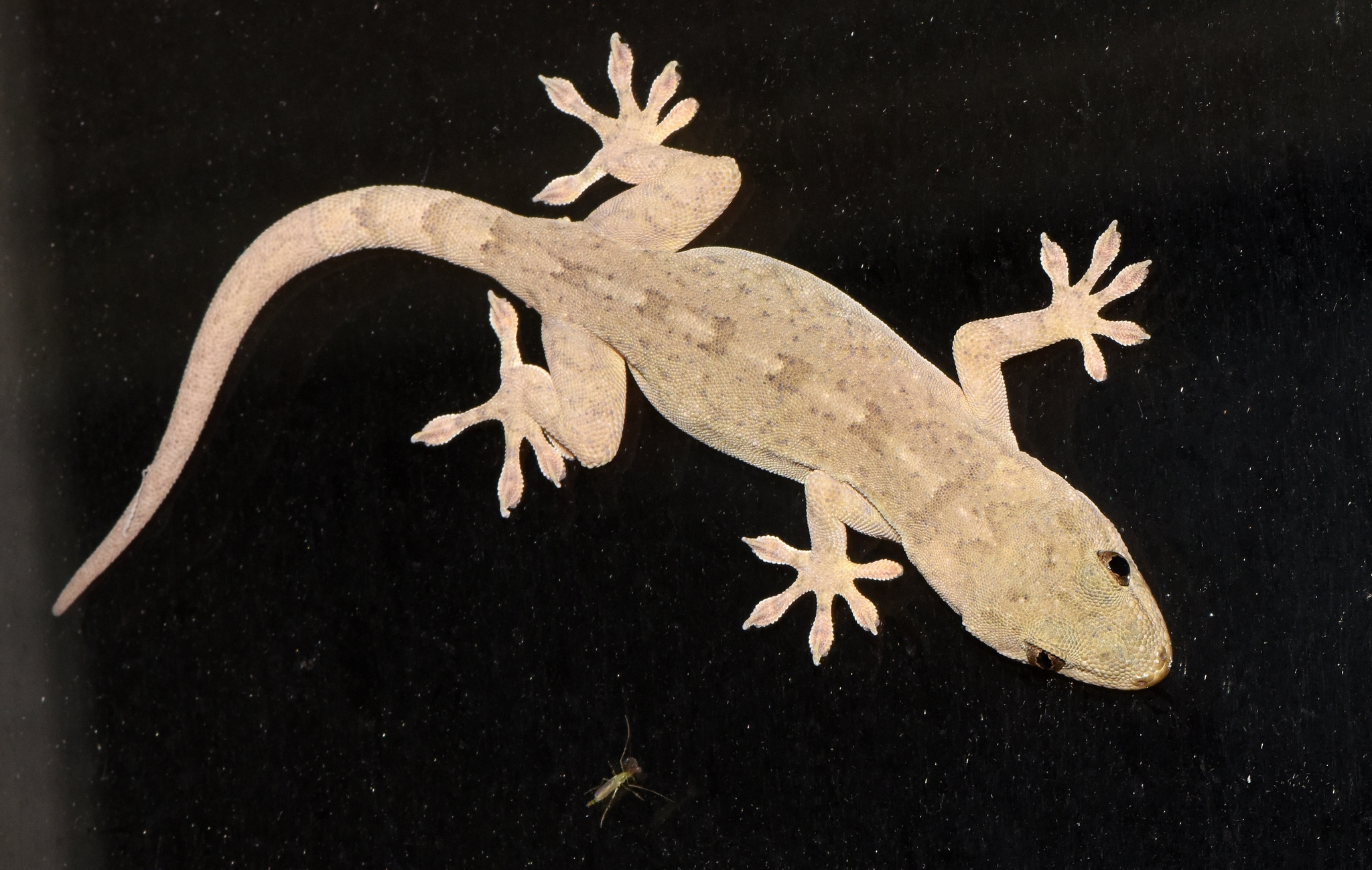

Conservation status
- Vulnerable (IUCN 3.1)

Scientific classification
- Kingdom: Animalia
- Phylum: Chordata
- Class: Reptilia
- Order: Squamata
- Suborder: Gekkota
- Family: Gekkonidae
- Genus: Gekko
- Species: G. swinhonis

Binomial name
- Gekko swinhonis Günther, 1864
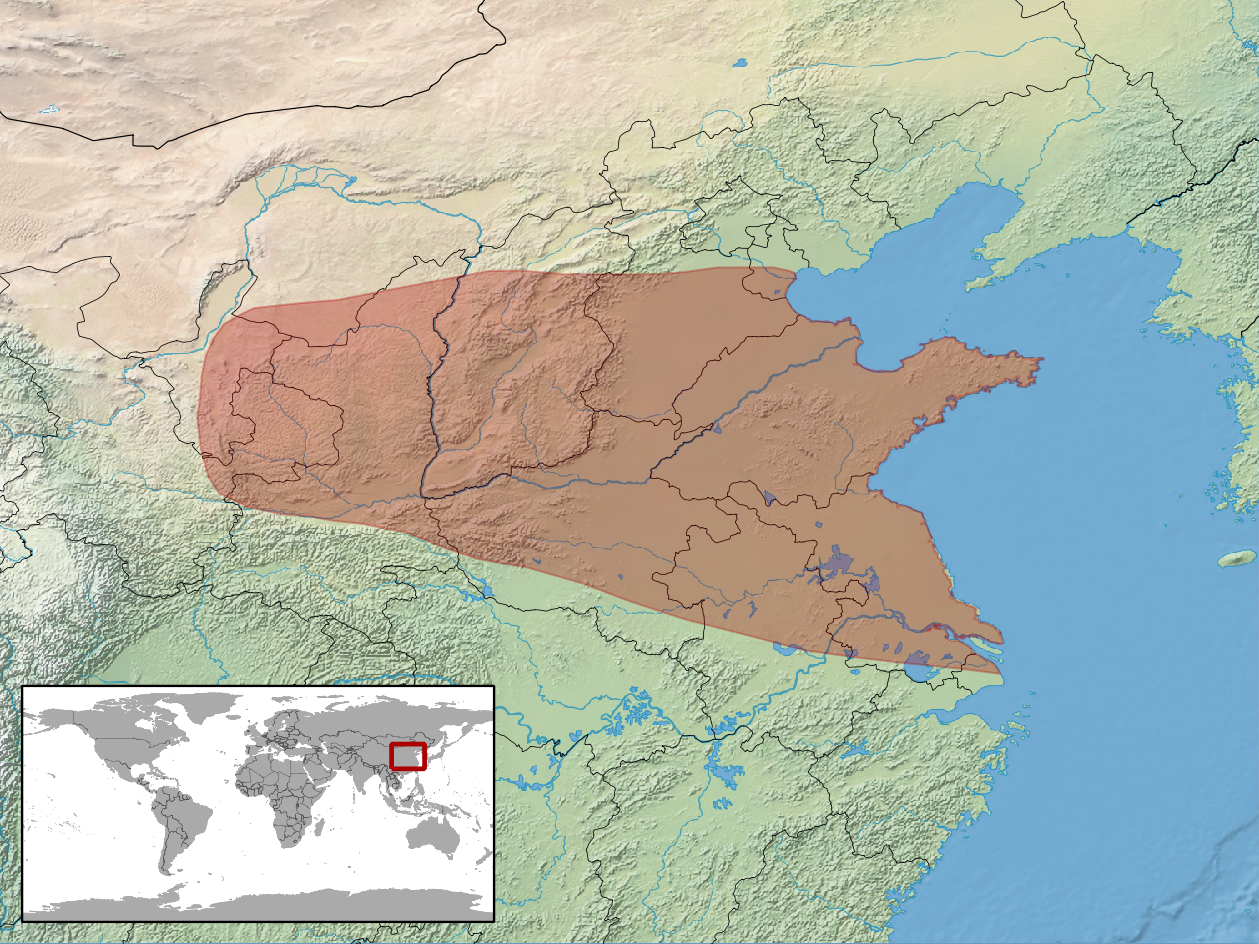

Synonyms
- Gecko swinhonis R. Swinhoe, 1863 (nomen nudum); Gecko swinhonis Günther, 1864; Gekko swinhonis — Schmidt, 1927; Gekko (Japonigekko) swinhonis — Wood et al., 2019

= Peking gecko =

Species of lizard

The Peking gecko (Gekko swinhonis) is a species of lizard in the family Gekkonidae. The species is endemic to China.

== Etymology ==
The specific name, swinhonis, is in honor of English naturalist Robert Swinhoe.

== Geographic range ==
G. swinhonis occurs in northern China, north of the Yangtze River. But they had also been introduced to Incheon, South Korea via ships.

== Habitat ==
The preferred natural habitats of G. swinhonis are arid and moist grasslands and plains.

== Reproduction ==
G. swinhonis is oviparous.

== Taxonomy ==
The species G. swinhonis was first described by British herpetologist Albert Günther in 1864.

== Conservation status ==
G. swinhonis has been assessed as "Vulnerable" due to an inferred 30% population decline over the last three generations due to harvest levels. This species has a relatively wide distribution but it is exploited for traditional medicine and is impacted by habitat loss and degradation.
