= Robert Swinhoe =

English diplomat and naturalist (1836–1877)

Robert Swinhoe FRS
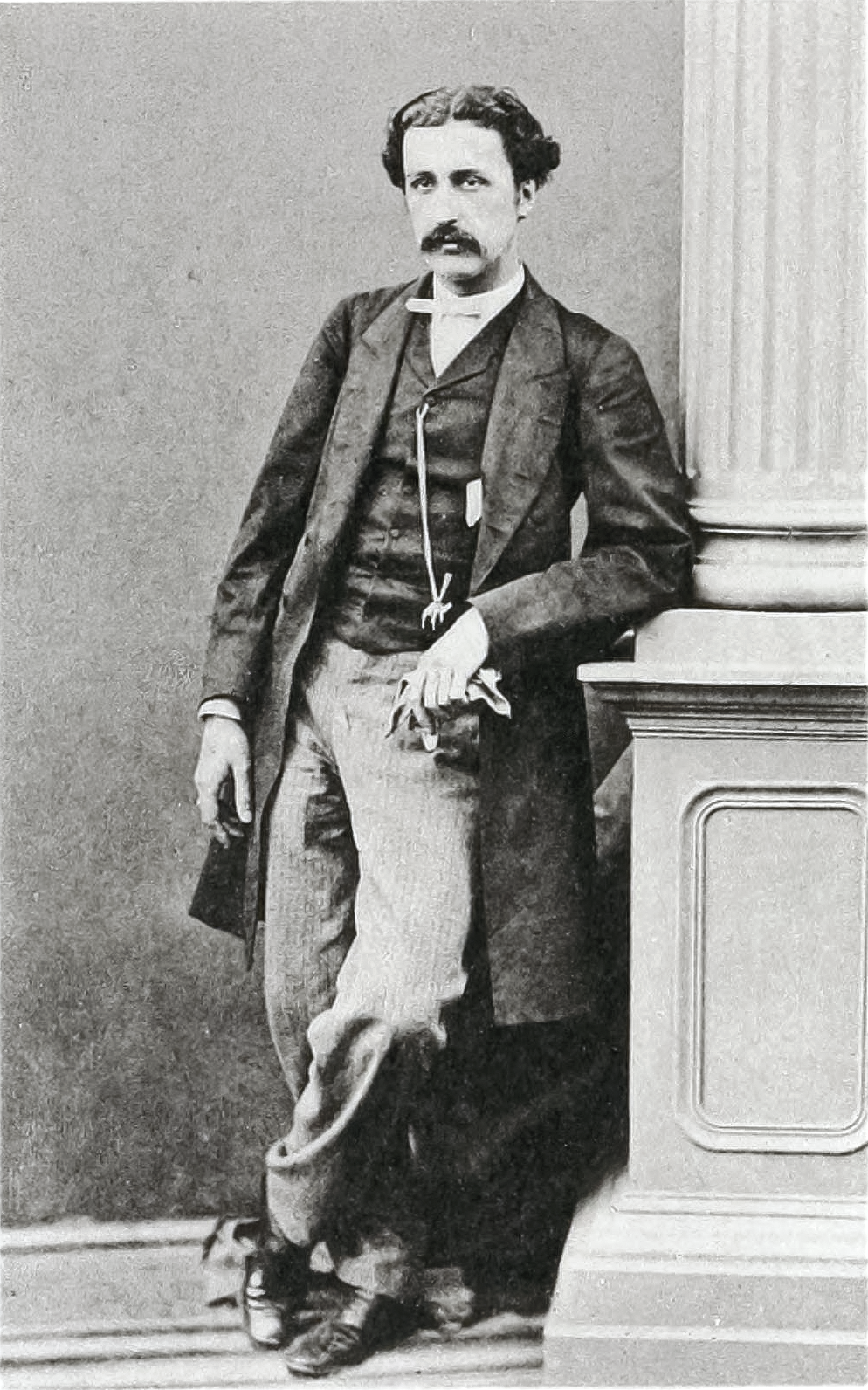
- Born: 1 September 1836; Kolkata
- Died: 28 October 1877 (aged 41)
- Education: University of London
- Known for: Cataloguing many Southeast Asian birds
- Scientific career
- Fields: Diplomat, naturalist, ornithologist
- Author abbrev. (zoology): Swinhoe

Robert Swinhoe FRS (1 September 1836 – 28 October 1877) was an English diplomat and naturalist who worked as a Consul in Qing-era Taiwan (then known to Westerners as Formosa). He catalogued many Southeast Asian birds, and several, such as Swinhoe's pheasant, are named after him.

== Biography ==
Swinhoe was born in colonial-era Kolkata (then known as Calcutta) where his father, who came from a Northumberland family, was a lawyer. There is no clear record of the date of his arrival in England, but it is known he attended the University of London, and in 1854, joined the China consular corps.

He was stationed to the remote port of Amoy, some 300 miles to the northeast of Hong Kong, in 1855. While at this port, he not only mastered the Chinese language (both official Mandarin and the local Amoy dialect), but also initiated a detailed and authoritative understanding of the ornithology of eastern China. In March 1856, Swinhoe made an "adventurous" visit to the camphor districts of northwestern Taiwan on board a lorcha, a hybrid vessel utilizing a European hull and Chinese rigging. Whether this was an official or a personal visit is unknown, but he made mention of it on several occasions through the rest of his published career. While at Amoy he courted and married Christina Stronach (née Lockie), the daughter of a Scottish missionary, in 1857.

In June and July 1858, Swinhoe participated in the circumnavigation of Taiwan on board HMS Inflexible in search of British and American castaways. He served as translator as well in two subsequent British actions against the Chinese in North China in 1858 and 1860, the latter resulting in his book The North China Campaign of 1860 (London, 1861), his personal account of the Second Opium War.

In 1860, Swinhoe was named as the first European consular representative to the island of Taiwan. Delays prevented him from physically obtaining that post until 1861. On 2 July of that year, Swinhoe and his assistant, George C. P. Braune (1838-1864), arrived at the prefectural capital, the southern city of Taiwan-fu (now Tainan). Shoaling of the harbor at Taiwan-fu prompted him to re-establish the British consulate at the northern port of Tamsui, where the bulk of foreign trade occurred. He published several articles on his first harried days as British representative in Taiwan, and as well numerous others on the rich wildlife of this isolated island.

Subsequently, he served as consul at Amoy, Ningbo, and Yantai, all on the mainland of China. He, at various times during his career, served as 'roving consul' for the British plenipotentiary in China for Great Britain, Rutherford Alcock. His duties in this capacity required a visit to explore Hainan, as well as a journey up the Yangtze River to Chongqing, in Sichuan Province, to help determine steamship navigability of that river. All the while he was stationed at those various postings, he retained the Taiwanese consulship, and indeed did not relinquish it until his retirement from the service of his government, in 1873. He spent his spare time in China collecting natural history specimens, and as the area had not previously been open to Westerners, many of the items he collected were new to science. As he was primarily an ornithologist, many of his new discoveries were birds, but he also found new fish, mammals and insects. He returned to England in 1862 with his collection. Many of the birds were first described in John Gould's Birds of Asia (1863).

== Natural history ==
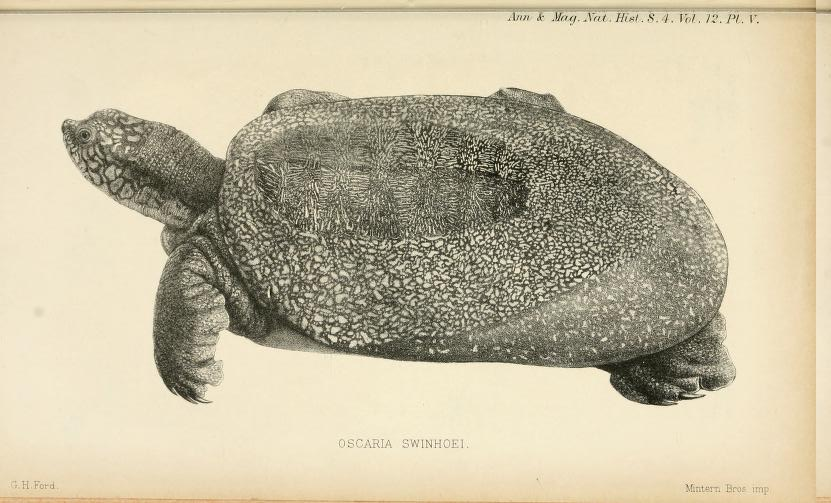
Illustration of the Yangtze giant softshell turtle (Rafetus swinhoei) sent by Robert Swinhoe to John Edward Gray at the British Museum.

At a young age, he had been interested in birds and had made a small collection of British birds, nests and eggs. He corresponded with Henry Stevenson and one of his first publications was in 1858, the year in which Charles Darwin and Alfred Russel Wallace published their papers on natural selection. Swinhoe took to the ideas of Darwin and in 1872, he named a species (now a subspecies) after Darwin (Pucrasia macrolopha darwini). He was a regular contributor to The Ibis after 1860 and later to the Proceedings of the Zoological Society of London.

During his travels, he studied the birds and mammals apart from studying the local culture. He collected both live animals and specimens on his travels and regularly sent them to the London Zoo. The first Pere David's deer in Europe came from him.

His primary interest was however in birds and on these he corresponded extensively with Edward Blyth. Around 1871, he started suffering from partial paralysis and he moved to the Yantai which he called the "Scarborough of China". He was forced by his ill health to leave China in October 1875. From his home in Chelsea, he continued to publish notes and his last publication in The Ibis was the description of a new genus and species of bird Liocichla steerii. He died at the age of 41, presumably of syphilis.

P. L. Sclater described him as "one of the most industrious and successful exploring naturalists that have ever lived" and after his death, A. R. Wallace wrote "due to Mr. Swinhoe's own exertions...there is probably no part of the world (if we except Europe, North America, and British India) of whose warm-blooded vertebrates we possess fuller or more accurate knowledge than we do of the coast districts of China and its islands."

His collection of 3,700 specimens was bought by Henry Seebohm and this was subsequently bequeathed to the Liverpool Museum.

Four species of mammals and 15 species of birds were named after Swinhoe, including Swinhoe's storm-petrel, which he first described himself in 1867. Also, four species of reptiles are named in his honor: Gekko swinhonis, Diploderma swinhonis, Rhabdophis swinhonis, and the Yangtze giant softshell turtle (Rafetus swinhoei), a specimen of which John Edward Gray received from Swinhoe in 1873.

One of Robert's brothers, Colonel Charles Swinhoe was a founding member of the Bombay Natural History Society in India and an expert on Lepidoptera.

== Published works ==
- Swinhoe, R. (1863). Notes on the Island of Formosa. London: F. Bell. OCLC 31834495. OL 21819253M.
- Swinhoe, R. (1864). "Notes on the Island of Formosa". Journal of the Royal Geographical Society of London. 34 (2): 6–18. doi:10.2307/1798463. JSTOR 1798463.
- Swinhoe, R. (1865). "Additional Notes on Formosa". Proceedings of the Royal Geographical Society of London. 10 (3): 122–128. doi:10.2307/1799660. JSTOR 1799660.
- Swinhoe, R. (1871). A revised catalogue of the birds of China and its islands, with descriptions of new species, references to former notes, and occasional remarks. London. doi:10.5962/bhl.title.17734. OCLC 16241663.
