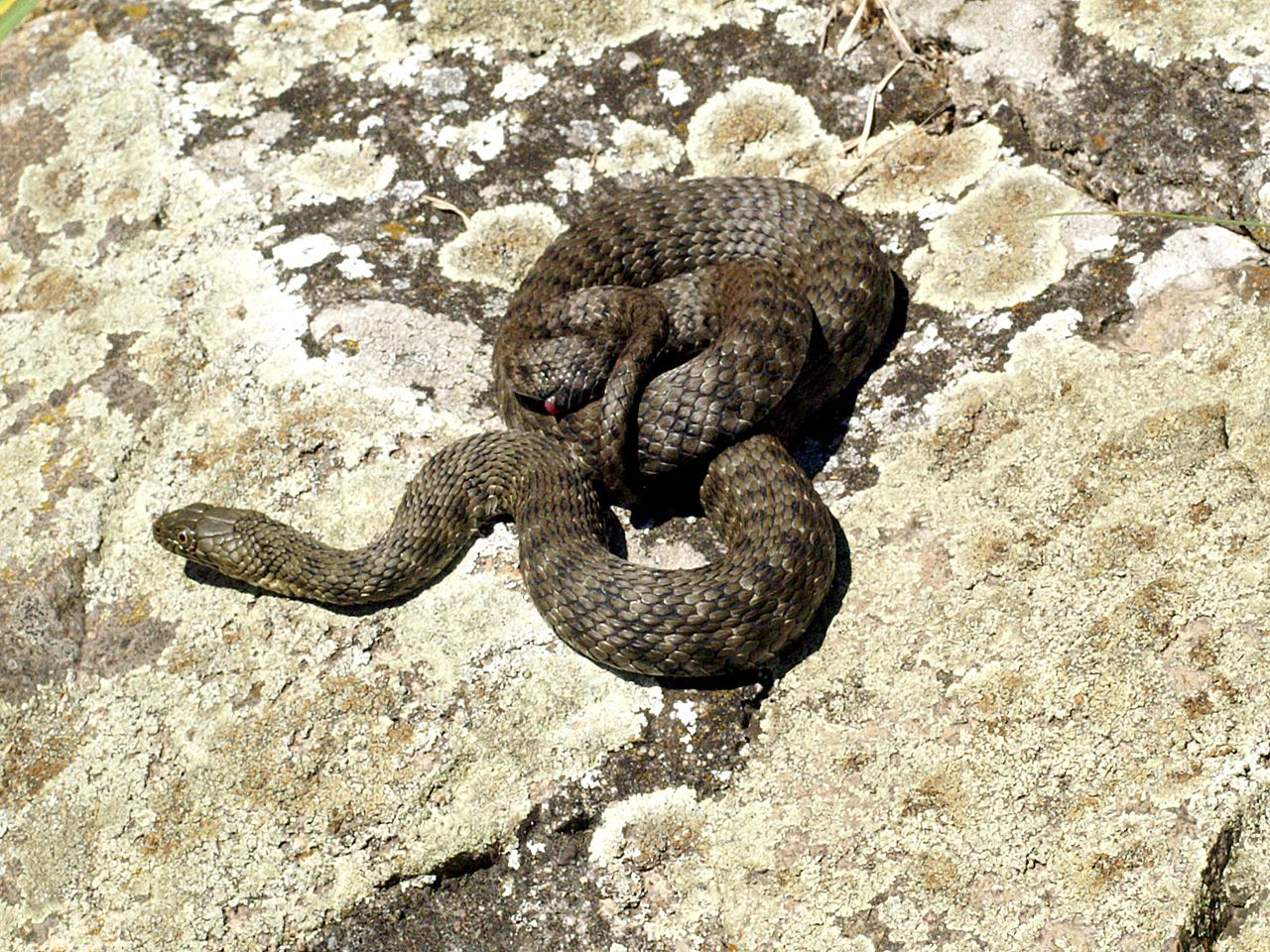
- Dice snake, Natrix tessellata

Scientific classification
- Kingdom: Animalia
- Phylum: Chordata
- Class: Reptilia
- Order: Squamata
- Suborder: Serpentes
- Family: Colubridae
- Subfamily: Natricinae; Bonaparte, 1838

Genera
- 36, see text

= Natricinae =

Subfamily of snakes

The Natricinae are a subfamily of colubroid snakes, sometimes referred to as a family (Natricidae). The subfamily comprises 36 genera. Members include many very common snake species, such as the European grass snakes, and the North American water snakes and garter snakes. Some Old World members of the subfamily are known as keelbacks, because their dorsal scales exhibit strong keeling.

Natricine snakes are found in Africa, Asia, Europe, North America, and Central America as far south as Costa Rica. A single species, Tropidonophis mairii, reaches Australia. Although the highest diversity is in North America, the oldest members are in Asia and Africa, suggesting an Old World origin for the group. Most species are semiaquatic and feed on fish and amphibians, although a few are semifossorial or leaf-litter snakes that feed on invertebrates. Most species are harmless to humans, but a few (e.g., Thamnophis sirtalis, Thamnophis elegans) are capable of inflicting bites that can result in local, non-life-threatening symptoms, and at least two members of the genus Rhabdophis (R. tigrinus and R. subminiatus) are capable of inflicting life-threatening bites to humans, though they have only enlarged, ungrooved fangs in the back of the mouth.

== Classification ==
The Natricinae are recognised as a sister group of the Dipsadinae plus the Pseudoxenodontinae.

== Genera ==
- Afronatrix Rossman & Eberle, 1977
- Amphiesma A.M.C. Duméril, Bibron & A.H.A. Duméril, 1854
- Amphiesmoides Malnate, 1961
- Anoplohydrus F. Werner, 1909
- Aspidura Wagler, 1830
- Atretium Cope, 1861
- Blythia Theobald, 1868
- Clonophis Cope, 1889
- Fowlea Theobald, 1868
- Haldea Baird & Girard, 1853
- Hebius Thompson, 1913
- Helophis de Witte & Laurent, 1942
- Herpetoreas Günther, 1860
- Hydrablabes Boulenger, 1891
- Hydraethiops Günther, 1872
- Iguanognathus Boulenger, 1898
- Isanophis David, Pauwels, Nguyen & G. Vogel, 2015
- Limnophis Günther, 1865
- Liodytes Cope, 1885
- Lycognathophis Boulenger, 1893
- Natriciteres Loveridge, 1953
- Natrix Laurenti, 1768
- Nerodia Baird & Girard, 1853
- Opisthotropis Günther, 1872
- Paratapinophis Angel, 1929
- Pseudagkistrodon Van Denburgh, 1909
- Regina Baird & Girard, 1853
- Rhabdophis Fitzinger, 1843
- Rhabdops Boulenger, 1893
- Sahyadriophis Patel, Thackeray, Campbell & Mirza, 2023
- Smithophis Giri, Gower, A. Das, Lalremsanga, Lalronunga, Captain & Deepak, 2019
- Storeria Baird & Girard, 1853
- Thamnophis Fitzinger, 1843
- Trachischium Günther, 1858
- Trimerodytes Cope, 1895
- Tropidoclonion Cope, 1860
- Tropidonophis Jan, 1863
- Virginia Baird & Girard, 1853
- Xenochrophis Günther, 1864
