= S. lateralis =

S. lateralis may refer to:

- Scincella lateralis, the little brown skink or ground skink, a small skink species found throughout much of the eastern half of the United States and into northern Mexico
- Spermophilus lateralis, the golden-mantled ground squirrel, a mammal species found across North America

== See also ==
- Lateralis (disambiguation)
