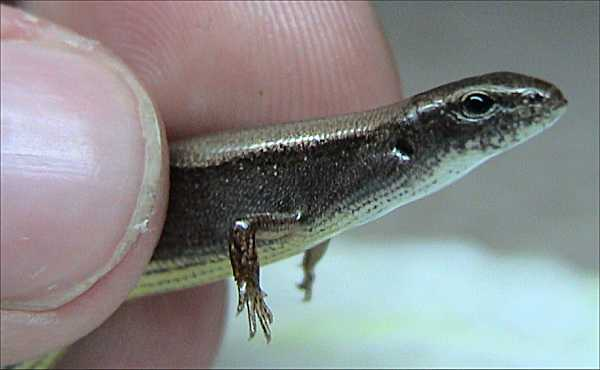
- Scincella lateralis, a ground skink

Scientific classification
- Kingdom: Animalia
- Phylum: Chordata
- Class: Reptilia
- Order: Squamata
- Family: Scincidae
- Subfamily: Sphenomorphinae
- Genus: Scincella; Mittleman, 1950

Synonyms
- Paralipinia Darevsky & Orlov, 1997

= Scincella =

Genus of lizards

Scincella is a genus of lizards in the skink family, Scincidae, commonly referred to as ground skinks. The exact number of species in the genus is unclear, as taxonomic reclassification is ongoing, and sources vary widely. Scincella species primarily range throughout the temperate regions of the world and are typically small, fossorial lizards, which consume a wide variety of arthropods. They are a generalized insectivore with well developed chemosensory abilities.

== Description ==
The Ground Skink (Scincella lateralis) a medium sized skink, that have a shiny brown back. They are most commonly found in moist woodland areas throughout the southeastern United States.

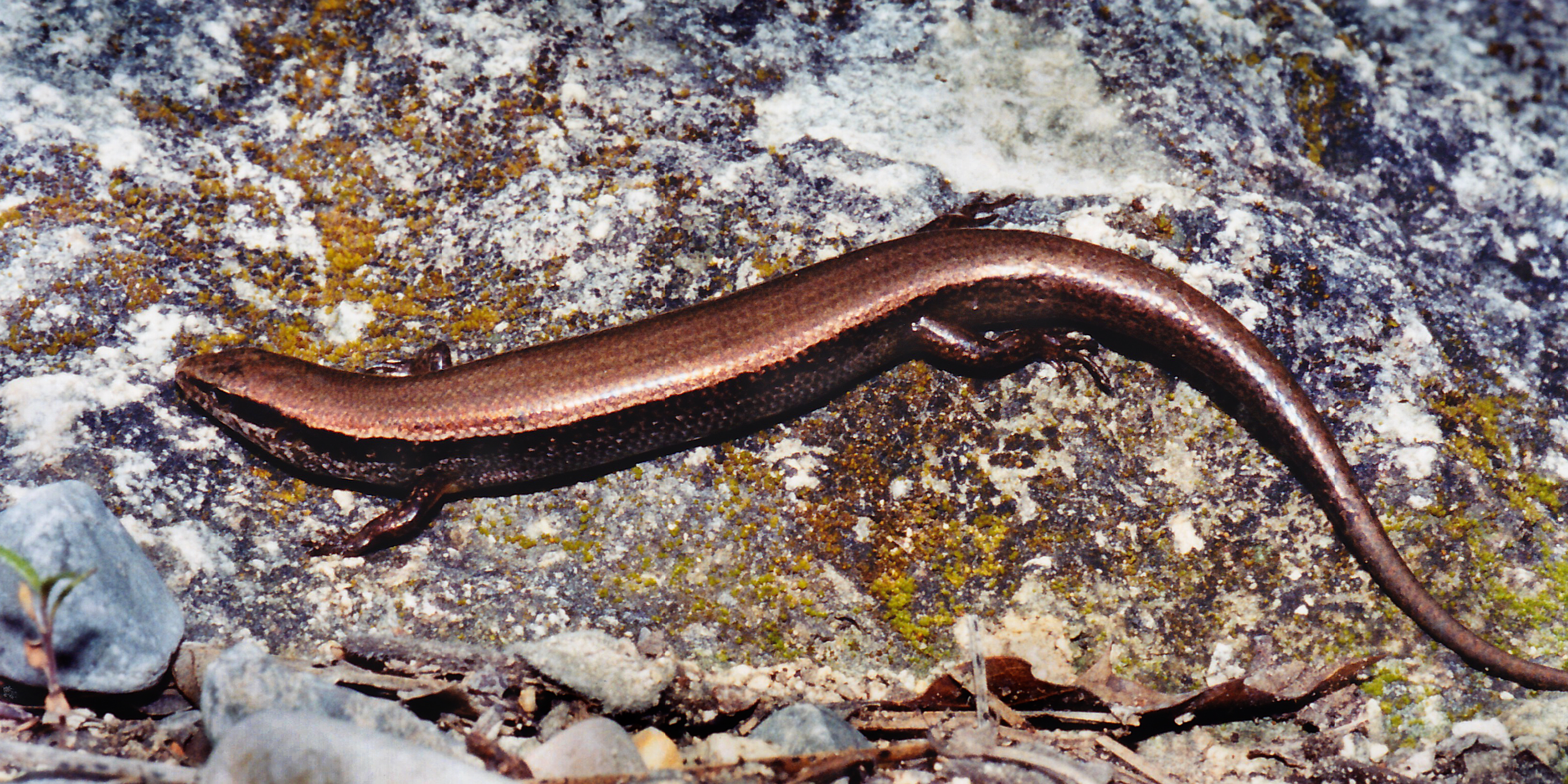
Horsetail Falls ground skink (Scincella caudaequinae) municipality of Jaumave, Tamaulipas, Mexico (11 August 2003).

== Species ==
The genus Scincella contains the following 53 recognized species:

- Scincella alia Bragin, Zenin, Nguyen & Poyarkov, 2025
- Scincella apraefrontalis Nguyen et al., 2010 - Huulien ground skink
- Scincella assata (Cope, 1864) - red forest skink
- Scincella auranticaudata Nguyen, Nguyen, Le, Nguyen, Phan, Vo, Murphy & Che, 2025
- Scincella badenensis Nguyen, Nguyen, Nguyen, & Murphy, 2019 - Baden ground skink
- Scincella balluca Bragin, Zenin, Le, Nguyen, Nguyen, Bobrov & Poyarkov, 2025
- Scincella baraensis Nguyen, Nguyen, Nguyen & Murphy, 2020
- Scincella barbouri (Stejneger, 1925) - Barbour's ground skink
- Scincella boettgeri (Van Denburgh, 1912) - Boettger's ground skink
- Scincella capitanea Ouboter, 1986 - large ground skink
- Scincella caudaequinae (H.M. Smith, 1951) - Horsetail Falls ground skink
- Scincella chengduensis Jia, Ren, Jiang, & Li, 2025
- Scincella cherriei (Cope, 1893) - brown forest skink
- Scincella darevskii Nguyen et al., 2010 - Darevsky's ground skink
- Scincella devorator (Darevsky, Orlov & Cuc, 2004)
- Scincella doriae (Boulenger, 1887) - Doria's ground skink, Doria's smooth skink
- Scincella dunan Koizumi, Ota, & Hikida, 2022
- Scincella fansipanensis Okabe, Motokawa, Koizumi, Nguyen, Nguyen & Bui, 2024
- Scincella forbesorum (Taylor, 1937)
- Scincella formosensis (Van Denburgh, 1912) - Van Denburgh's ground skink
- Scincella gemmingeri (Cope, 1864) - forest ground skink
- Scincella honbaensis Nguyen, Nguyen, Le, Nguyen, Phan, Vo, Murphy & Che, 2025
- Scincella heishuiensi Liu, Pu, Tan, Chen, Lyu, Shu, Wu, Dong & Guo, 2026
- Scincella huanrenensis Zhao & Huang, 1982
- Scincella incerta (Stuart, 1940)
- Scincella jinchuanensis (Liu et al., 2026)
- Scincella kikaapoa García-Vázquez et al., 2010
- Scincella lateralis (Say, 1823) - little brown skink, ground skink
- Scincella liangshanensis Jia, Gao, Wu, Ren, Jiang & Wu, 2024
- Scincella macrotis (Steindachner, 1867) - large-eared ground skink
- Scincella maerkangensis (Liu et al., 2026)
- Scincella melanosticta (Boulenger, 1887) - black ground skink, black-spotted smooth skink
- Scincella modesta (Günther, 1864) - modest ground skink
- Scincella montana Valdenegro-Brito, Esaú, De la Vega-Pérez & García-Vázquez, 2025
- Scincella monticola (K.P. Schmidt, 1925) - mountainous dwarf skink
- Scincella ngati A. V. Pham, et al. 2026
- Scincella nigrofasciata Neang, Chan, & Poyarkov, 2018
- Scincella ochracea (Bourret, 1937)
- Scincella ouboteri A. V. Pham, C. T. Pham, Le, Ngoc, Ziegler & Nguyen, 2024
- Scincella potanini (Günther, 1896)
- Scincella przewalskii (Bedriaga, 1912)
- Scincella punctatolineata (Boulenger, 1893) - Burma smooth skink
- Scincella qianica Xu, Weng, Poyarkov, Zhang, Deng & Peng, 2025
- Scincella rara (Darevsky & Orlov, 1997) - double subdigital-pads skink
- Scincella reevesii (Gray, 1838) - Reeves's smooth skink
- Scincella rufocaudata (Darevsky & Nguyen, 1983) - red-tailed ground skink
- Scincella rupicola (M.A. Smith, 1916)
- Scincella schmidti (Barbour, 1927)
- Scincella silvicola (Taylor, 1937)
- Scincella stuarti (Smith, 1941)
- Scincella tenuistriata Xu, Gong, Nguyen, Deng, Bragin, Weng, Zhang, Poyarkov & Peng, 2025
- Scincella truongi A. V. Pham, Ziegler, C. T. Pham, Hoang, Ngo & Le, 2025
- Scincella tsinlingensis (Hu & Zhao, 1966)
- Scincella vandenburghi (K.P. Schmidt, 1927) - Korean skink, Tsushima ground skink, Tsushima smooth skink)
- Scincella victoriana (Shreve, 1940)
- Scincella wangyuezhaoi Jia, Gao, Huang, Ren, Jiang, & Li, 2023

Nota bene: A binomial authority in parentheses indicates that the species was originally described in a genus other than Scincella.
