= Cyrtodactylus phuocbinhensis =

Scientific classification
- Kingdom: Animalia
- Phylum: Chordata
- Class: Reptilia
- Order: Squamata
- Suborder: Gekkota
- Family: Gekkonidae
- Genus: Cyrtodactylus
- Species: C. phuocbinhensis

Binomial name
- Cyrtodactylus phuocbinhensis Nguyen, Le, Tran, Orlov, Lathrop, Macculloch, Le, Jin, Nguyen, Nguyen, Hoang, Che, Murphy, & Zhang, 2013

Species of lizard

Cyrtodactylus phuocbinhensis is a species of gecko that is endemic to Vietnam.
