= Leptobrachium banae =

Conservation status
- Least Concern (IUCN 3.1)

Scientific classification
- Kingdom: Animalia
- Phylum: Chordata
- Class: Amphibia
- Order: Anura
- Family: Megophryidae
- Genus: Leptobrachium
- Species: L. banae

Binomial name
- Leptobrachium banae Lathrop, Murphy, Orlov & Cuc, 1998

Species of amphibian

Leptobrachium banae is a species of amphibian in the family Megophryidae. It is found in Laos, Vietnam, and possibly Cambodia. Its type locality is Ko Rong village, Gia Lai Province, Vietnam.

Its natural habitats are subtropical or tropical moist lowland forests, subtropical or tropical moist montane forests, and rivers.

It is threatened by habitat loss. This species was discovered by Bahnar hunters and is largely brown with red-orange spots on the back and bright red and black stripes on its limbs.
