= Leptobrachium xanthospilum =

Conservation status
- Endangered (IUCN 3.1)

Scientific classification
- Kingdom: Animalia
- Phylum: Chordata
- Class: Amphibia
- Order: Anura
- Family: Megophryidae
- Genus: Leptobrachium
- Species: L. xanthospilum

Binomial name
- Leptobrachium xanthospilum Lathrop, Murphy, Orlov & Cuc, 1998a

Species of frog

Leptobrachium xanthospilum, commonly called the yellow-spotted spadefoot toad, is a species of frog in the family Megophryidae. It is endemic to Vietnam, where it is known only from the vicinity of Ko Rong, Tram Lap, and Buôn Lưới villages in Gia Lai Province.

Its natural habitats are subtropical or tropical moist lowland forests and rivers. It is threatened by habitat loss. This species derives its specific name from the Greek words "xanthos", which means yellow, and "spilos", which means spot, and refers to the species' prominent yellow spots.
