= Leptobrachella nahangensis =

Conservation status
- Data Deficient (IUCN 3.1)

Scientific classification
- Kingdom: Animalia
- Phylum: Chordata
- Class: Amphibia
- Order: Anura
- Family: Megophryidae
- Genus: Leptobrachella
- Species: L. nahangensis

Binomial name
- Leptobrachella nahangensis (Lathrop, Murphy, Orlov & Ho, 1998)
- Distribution of L. nahangensis

Synonyms
- Leptolalax nahangensis Lathrop, Murphy, Orlov, and Ho, 1998; Leptolalax (Lalax) nahangensis Delorme, Dubois, Grosjean, and Ohler, 2006; Leptolalax (Lalos) nahangensis Dubois, Grosjean, Ohler, Adler, and Zhao, 2010

Species of amphibian

Leptobrachella nahangensis (Nahang Asian toad) is a frog species in the family Megophryidae. It is endemic to Tuyên Quang Province, northern Vietnam. Its natural habitats are subtropical moist lowland forests, rivers, and caves. Its status is insufficiently known. This species has only been found near the entrance to a cave in Na Hang Nature Reserve.

== Description ==
Leptobrachella nahangensis is large for its genus: male measures 41 mm (1.6 in) in snout-vent length. Its back is lavender-brown with large, irregular mottling and sides have large spots. It has golden irises, described as "piercing gold".
