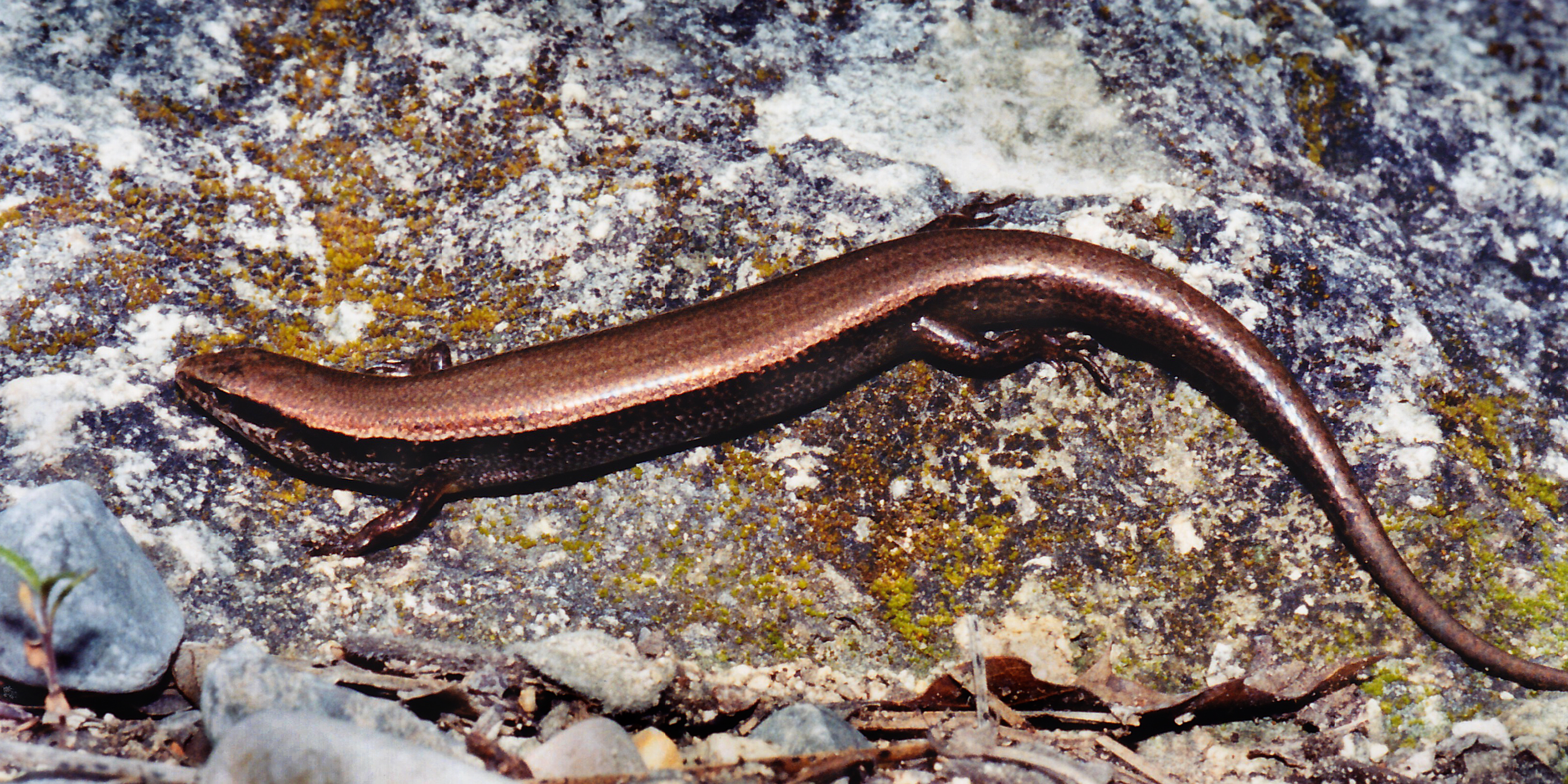
- In Jaumave, Tamaulipas, Mexico

Scientific classification
- Domain: Eukaryota
- Kingdom: Animalia
- Phylum: Chordata
- Class: Reptilia
- Order: Squamata
- Family: Scincidae
- Genus: Scincella
- Species: S. caudaequinae

Binomial name
- Scincella caudaequinae (Smith, 1951)

Synonyms
- Leiolopisma caudaequinae Smith, 1951; Scincella silvicola caudaequinae Darling and Smith, 1954

= Scincella caudaequinae =

Species of lizard

Scincella caudaequinae, commonly known as the Horsetail Falls ground skink, is a species of reptile in the family Scincidae that is endemic to Mexico. It was named for the type locality "Horsetail Falls, 25 miles south of Monterrey, Nuevo, Leon". Scincella caudaequinae occurs in the northern Sierra Madre Oriental in Nuevo Leon, San Luis Potosi, southeast Coahuila, and Tamaulipas. It was considered a subspecies of Scincella silvicola for many decades.
