= Cyrtodactylus ziegleri =

Conservation status
- Least Concern (IUCN 3.1)

Scientific classification
- Kingdom: Animalia
- Phylum: Chordata
- Class: Reptilia
- Order: Squamata
- Suborder: Gekkota
- Family: Gekkonidae
- Genus: Cyrtodactylus
- Species: C. ziegleri

Binomial name
- Cyrtodactylus ziegleri Nazarov, Orlov, N.S. Nguyen & Ho, 2008

Species of lizard

Cyrtodactylus ziegleri is a species of gecko, a lizard in the family Gekkonidae. The species is endemic to Vietnam.

== Etymology ==
The specific name, ziegleri, is in honor of German herpetologist Thomas Ziegler.

== Geographic range ==
C. ziegleri is found in southern Vietnam, in Dak Lak Province.

== Habitat ==
The preferred natural habitat of C. ziegleri is forest, at altitudes of 500–2,000 m (1,600–6,600 ft).

== Description ==
Relatively large for its genus, C. ziegleri may attain a snout-to-vent length (SVL) of 9.3 cm (3.7 in).

== Reproduction ==
The mode of reproduction of C. ziegleri is unknown.
