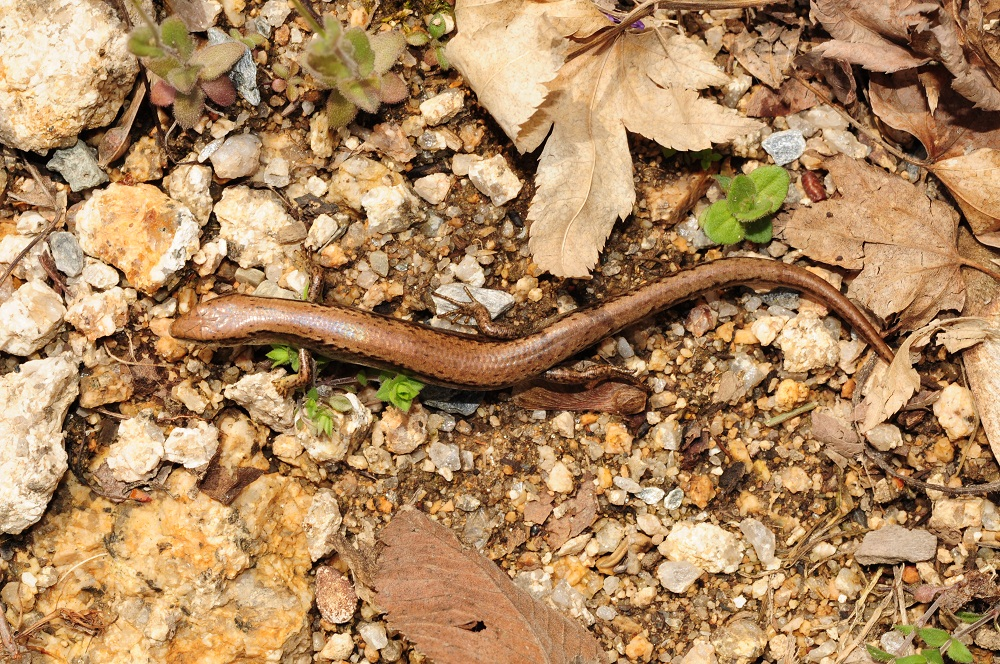

Conservation status
- Least Concern (IUCN 3.1)

Scientific classification
- Kingdom: Animalia
- Phylum: Chordata
- Class: Reptilia
- Order: Squamata
- Family: Scincidae
- Genus: Scincella
- Species: S. vandenburghi

Binomial name
- Scincella vandenburghi (Schmidt, 1927)
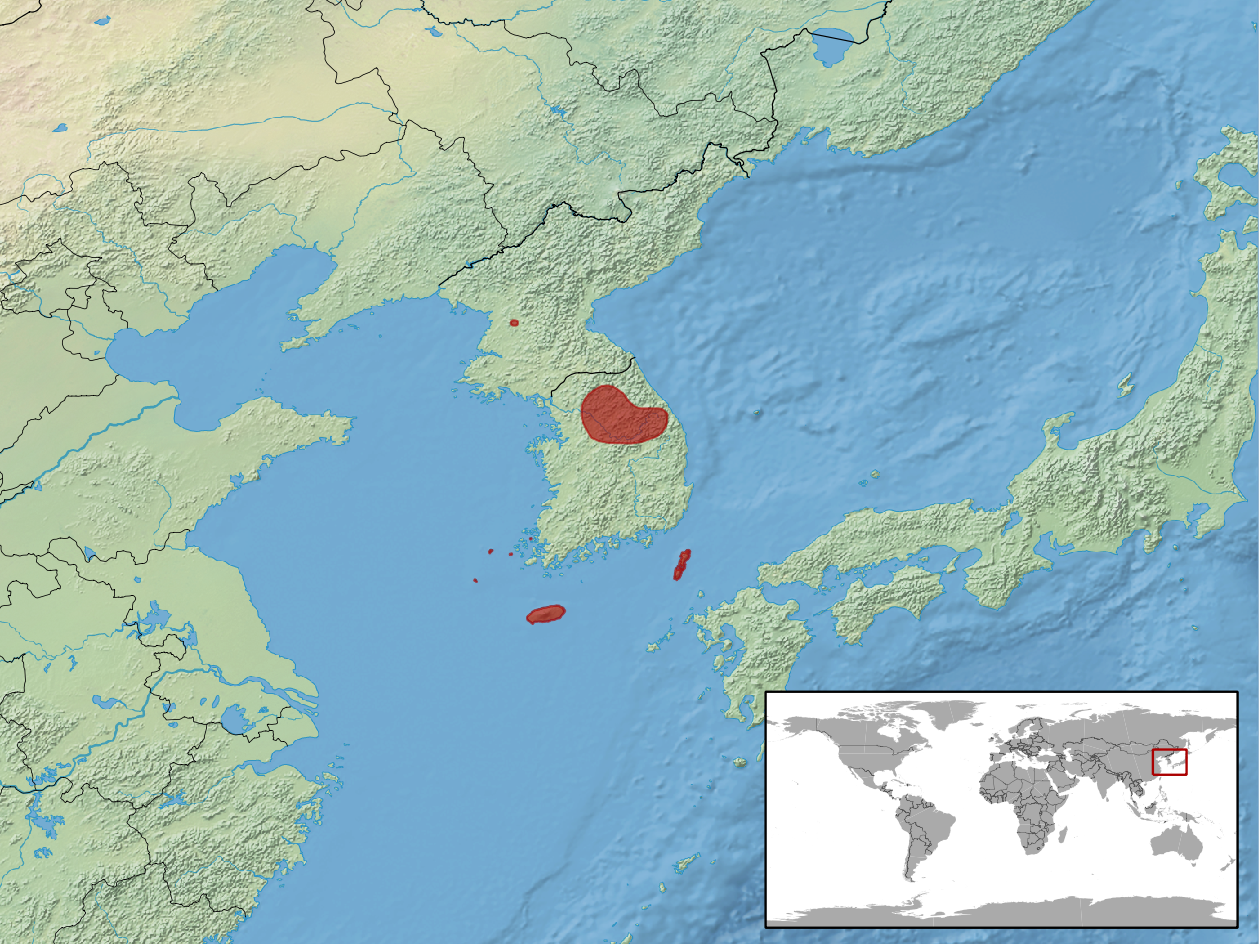

Synonyms
- Leiolopisma vandenburghi Schmidt, 1927; Scincella vandenburghi — Greer, 1974

= Scincella vandenburghi =

Species of lizard

Scincella vandenburghi, also known commonly as the Korean skink, the Tsushima ground skink, and the Tsushima smooth skink, is a species of skink, a lizard in the family Scincidae. The species is endemic to East Asia

== Geographic range ==
S. vandenburghi is found on the Korean Peninsula and on Tsushima Island, Japan.

== Taxonomy ==
Scincella vandenburghi may be a synonym of Scincella modesta.

== Etymology ==
S. vandenburghi is named after John Van Denburgh, curator of herpetology at the California Academy of Sciences.

== Habitat ==
S. vandenburghi inhabits temperate forests where it can be found on the forest floor.

== Reproduction ==
S. vandenburghi is oviparous, laying one to nine eggs in early summer.
