= Leptobrachella sungi =

Conservation status
- Least Concern (IUCN 3.1)

Scientific classification
- Kingdom: Animalia
- Phylum: Chordata
- Class: Amphibia
- Order: Anura
- Family: Megophryidae
- Genus: Leptobrachella
- Species: L. sungi

Binomial name
- Leptobrachella sungi (Lathrop, Murphy, Orlov and Ho, 1998)

Synonyms
- Leptolalax sungi Lathrop, Murphy, Orlov, and Ho, 1998; Paramegophrys sangi Fei, Hu, Ye, and Huang, 2009

Species of amphibian

Leptobrachella sungi (Sung toad or Sung's metacarpal-tubercled toad) is a frog species in the family Megophryidae. It is found in Vĩnh Phúc and Lào Cai Provinces in northern Vietnam and in Guangxi in southern China. Its natural habitats are subtropical moist lowland forests, moist montane forests, and rivers. Its status is insufficiently known. This species was first found along a stream near Tam Đảo village, about 925 meters ASL.

== Description ==
Leptobrachella sungi are the largest frogs in the genus Leptobrachella: males measure 48–53 mm (1.9–2.1 in) and females 57–59 mm (2.2–2.3 in) in snout-vent length. Their back is granular with distinct tubercles but uniform in colour or with light spots. The sides have small dark spots. They have iridescent gold-green irises.
