= Darevsky's bent-toed gecko =

Conservation status
- Data Deficient (IUCN 3.1)

Scientific classification
- Kingdom: Animalia
- Phylum: Chordata
- Class: Reptilia
- Order: Squamata
- Suborder: Gekkota
- Family: Gekkonidae
- Genus: Cyrtodactylus
- Species: C. darevskii

Binomial name
- Cyrtodactylus darevskii Nazarov, Poyarkov, Orlov, N.S. Nguyen, Milto, Martynov, Konstantinov & Chulisov, 2014

Species of lizard

Darevsky's bent-toed gecko (Cyrtodactylus darevskii) is a species of lizard in the family Gekkonidae. The species is endemic to Laos.

== Etymology ==
The specific name, darevskii, is in honor of Russian herpetologist Ilya Darevsky.

== Geographic range ==
C. darevskii is found in central Laos, in Khammouane Province.

== Habitat ==
The preferred natural habitats of C. darevskii are forest, rocky areas, and dry caves.

== Description ==
Large for its genus, C. darevskii may attain a snout-to-vent length (SVL) of 10 cm (3.9 in).

== Reproduction ==
The mode of reproduction of C. darevskii is unknown.
