= Scincella apraefrontalis =

Conservation status
- Data Deficient (IUCN 3.1)

Scientific classification
- Kingdom: Animalia
- Phylum: Chordata
- Class: Reptilia
- Order: Squamata
- Family: Scincidae
- Genus: Scincella
- Species: S. apraefrontalis

Binomial name
- Scincella apraefrontalis Nguyen, Nguyen, Böhme, & Ziegler, 2010

Species of lizard

The Huulien ground skink (Scincella apraefrontalis) is a species of skink found in Vietnam.
