= Scincella monticola =

Conservation status
- Least Concern (IUCN 3.1)

Scientific classification
- Kingdom: Animalia
- Phylum: Chordata
- Class: Reptilia
- Order: Squamata
- Suborder: Scinciformata
- Infraorder: Scincomorpha
- Family: Sphenomorphidae
- Genus: Scincella
- Species: S. monticola

Binomial name
- Scincella monticola (Schmidt, 1925)
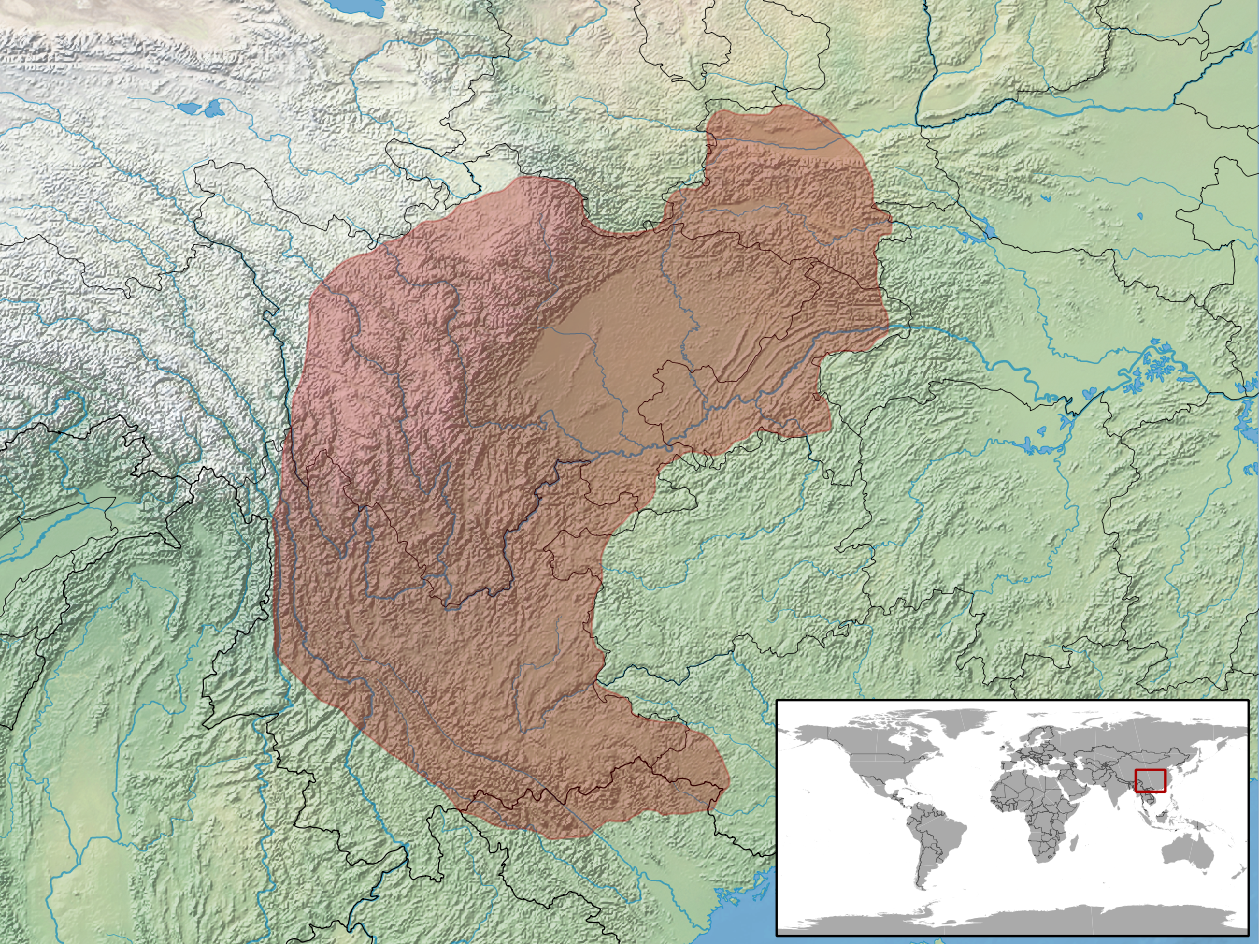

Species of lizard

The mountainous dwarf skink (Scincella monticola) is a species of skink found in China and Vietnam.
