= Scincella macrotis =

Scientific classification
- Kingdom: Animalia
- Phylum: Chordata
- Class: Reptilia
- Order: Squamata
- Family: Scincidae
- Genus: Scincella
- Species: S. macrotis

Binomial name
- Scincella macrotis (Steindachner, 1867)

Synonyms
- Euprepes macrotis Steindachner, 1867; Lygosoma macrotis (Steindachner, 1867); Leiolopisma macrotis (Steindachner, 1867)

Species of lizard

Scincella macrotis, the large-eared ground skink, is a species of skink found in the Nicobar Islands of India.
