= Scincella schmidti =

Conservation status
- Data Deficient (IUCN 3.1)

Scientific classification
- Kingdom: Animalia
- Phylum: Chordata
- Class: Reptilia
- Order: Squamata
- Suborder: Scinciformata
- Infraorder: Scincomorpha
- Family: Sphenomorphidae
- Genus: Scincella
- Species: S. schmidti

Binomial name
- Scincella schmidti (Barbour, 1927)

Species of lizard

Scincella schmidti is a species of skink found in China.
