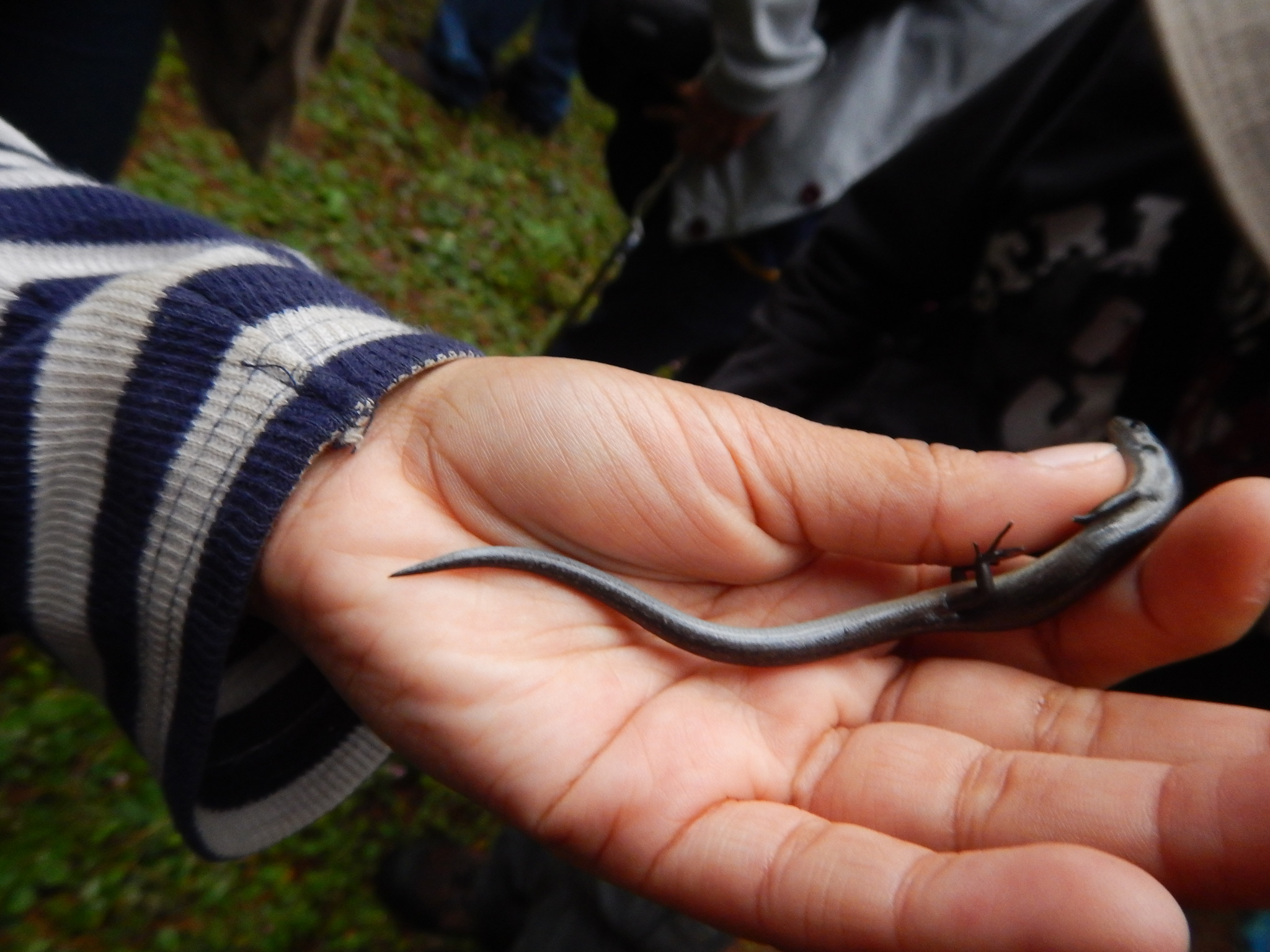

Conservation status
- Least Concern (IUCN 3.1)

Scientific classification
- Kingdom: Animalia
- Phylum: Chordata
- Class: Reptilia
- Order: Squamata
- Family: Scincidae
- Genus: Scincella
- Species: S. gemmingeri

Binomial name
- Scincella gemmingeri (Cope, 1864)
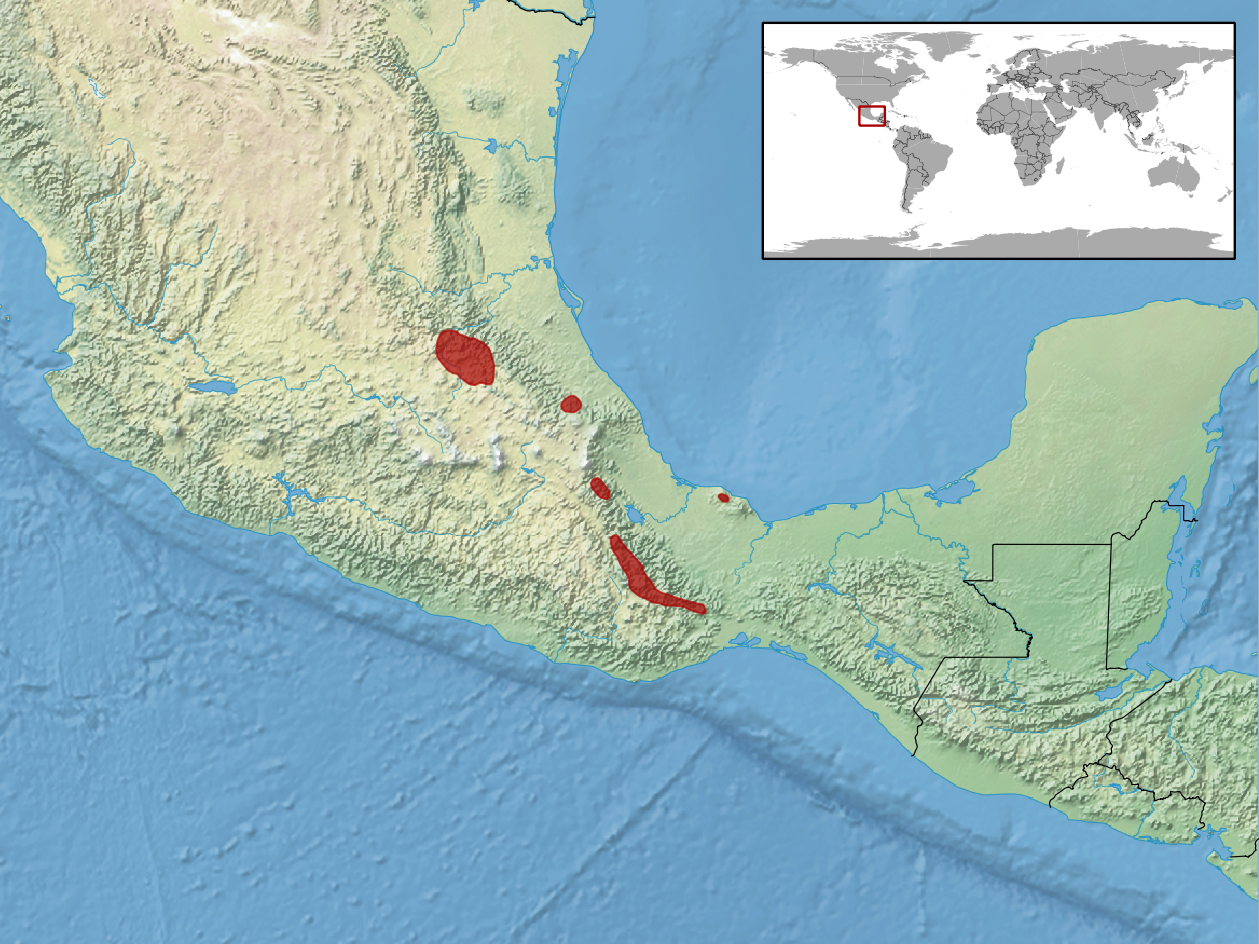

Synonyms
- Oligosoma gemmingeri Cope, 1864; Lygosoma (Mocoa) gemmingeri — Bocourt, 1881; Lygosoma laterale (part) — Boulenger, 1887; Leiolopisma gemmingeri — Taylor, 1937; Scincella gemmingeri — H.M. Smith & Taylor, 1950

= Scincella gemmingeri =

Species of lizard

Scincella gemmingeri, commonly known as the forest ground skink, Cope's forest ground skink, and la escíncela de bosque de Cope in Mexican Spanish, is a species of lizard in the family Scincidae. The species is endemic to Mexico.

== Etymology ==
The specific name, gemmingeri, is in honor of German coleopterist Max Gemminger (1820–1887).

== Geographic range ==
S. gemmingeri is found in the coastal regions of the Mexican state of Veracruz and various surrounding states.

== Habitat ==
As its common name implies, the forest ground skink occurs primarily in forests, especially rainforests, oak forests, cloud forests, and tropical evergreen forests, at altitudes of 200–2,000 m (660–6,560 ft), although it is also sometimes found on pastureland.

== Conservation status ==
S. gemmingeri faced no major threats as of 2020.

== Reproduction ==
S. gemmingeri is ovoviparous.

== Description ==
Like all members of the genus Scincella, S. gemmingeri is long and cylindrical, with short limbs. Its color is dark gray, and it has a dark stripe originating at the snout and running dorsolaterally along its body. Its maximum snout-vent length (SVL) is about 45 mm (1.8 in).
