= Scincella badenensis =

Scientific classification
- Domain: Eukaryota
- Kingdom: Animalia
- Phylum: Chordata
- Class: Reptilia
- Order: Squamata
- Family: Scincidae
- Genus: Scincella
- Species: S. badenensis

Binomial name
- Scincella badenensis Nguyen, Nguyen, Nguyen, & Murphy, 2019

Species of lizard

The Baden ground skink (Scincella badenensis) is a species of skink found in Vietnam.
