= Sphenomorphus yersini =

Scientific classification
- Kingdom: Animalia
- Phylum: Chordata
- Class: Reptilia
- Order: Squamata
- Family: Scincidae
- Genus: Sphenomorphus
- Species: S. yersini

Binomial name
- Sphenomorphus yersini Nguyen, Nguyen, Nguyen, Orlov, & Murphy, 2018

Species of lizard

Sphenomorphus yersini, Yersin’s forest skink, is a species of skink found in Vietnam.
