= Scincella punctatolineata =

Conservation status
- Least Concern (IUCN 3.1)

Scientific classification
- Kingdom: Animalia
- Phylum: Chordata
- Class: Reptilia
- Order: Squamata
- Suborder: Scinciformata
- Infraorder: Scincomorpha
- Family: Sphenomorphidae
- Genus: Scincella
- Species: S. punctatolineata

Binomial name
- Scincella punctatolineata (Boulenger, 1893)
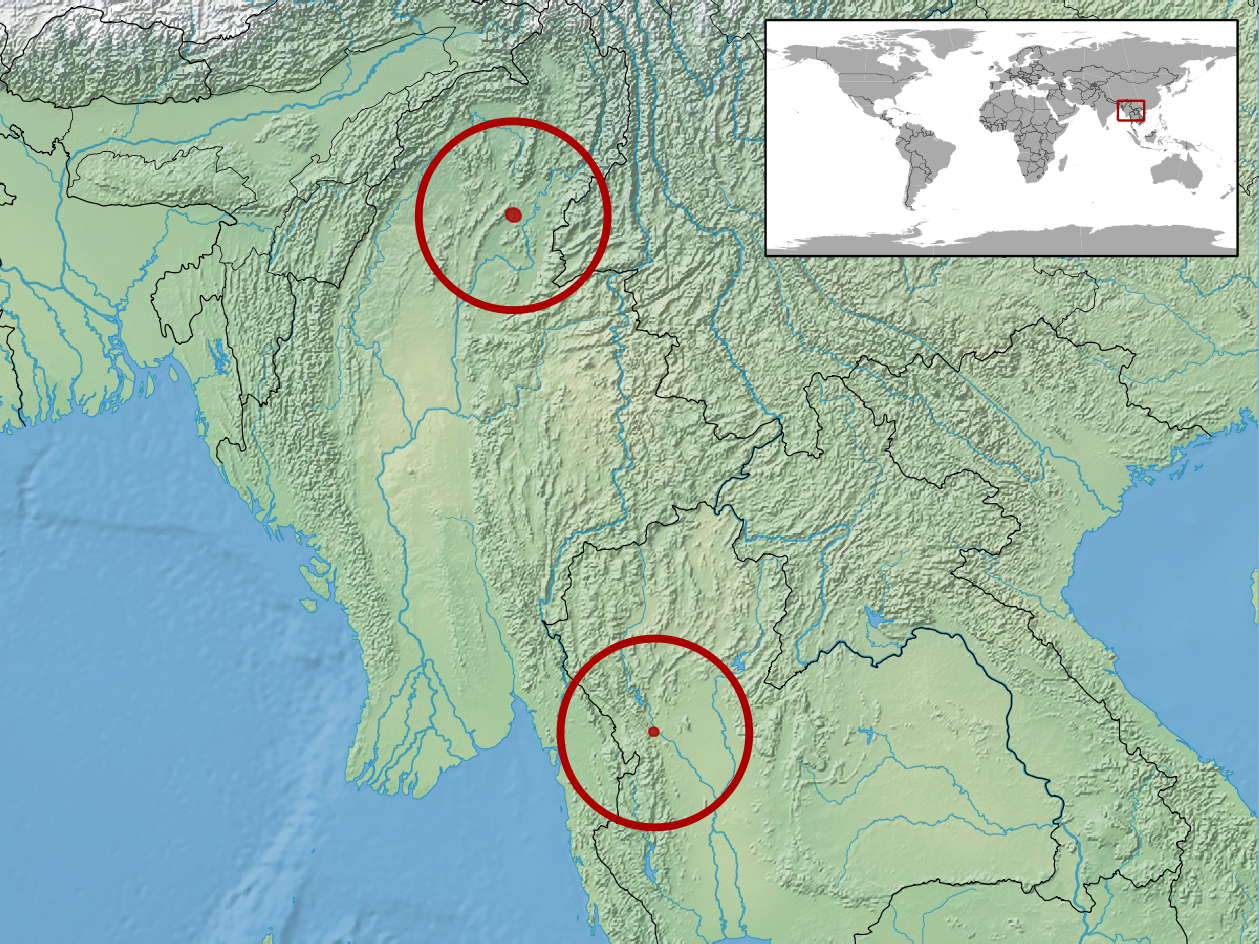

Species of skink found in Mexico

Scincella punctatolineata, the Burma smooth skink, is a species of skink found in Myanmar and Thailand.
