= Scincella baraensis =

Scientific classification
- Kingdom: Animalia
- Phylum: Chordata
- Class: Reptilia
- Order: Squamata
- Family: Scincidae
- Genus: Scincella
- Species: S. baraensis

Binomial name
- Scincella baraensis Nguyen, Nguyen, Nguyen, & Murphy, 2020

Species of lizard

The Bara ground skink (Scincella baraensis) is a species of skink found in Vietnam.
