= Scincella doriae =

Conservation status
- Least Concern (IUCN 3.1)

Scientific classification
- Kingdom: Animalia
- Phylum: Chordata
- Class: Reptilia
- Order: Squamata
- Family: Scincidae
- Genus: Scincella
- Species: S. doriae

Binomial name
- Scincella doriae (Boulenger, 1887)

Synonyms
- Lygosoma doriae Boulenger, 1887; Leiolopisma doriae — Schmidt, 1927; Scincella doriae — Greer, 1974

Species of skink found in Mexico

Scincella doriae, also known commonly as Doria's ground skink and Doria's smooth skink, is a species of lizard in the family Scincidae. The species is native to Southeast Asia.

== Etymology ==
The specific name, doriae, is in honor of Italian zoologist Giacomo Doria.

== Geographic range ==
A. doriae is found in China (Sichuan, Yunnan), Myanmar, Thailand, and Vietnam.

== Habitat ==
The preferred natural habitat of S. doriae is forest, at altitudes around 1,200 m (3,900 ft).

== Description ==
Large for the genus Scincella, adults of S. doriae have an average snout-to-vent length (SVL) of 5.6 cm (2.2 in).

== Reproduction ==
The mode of reproduction of S. doriae is unknown.
