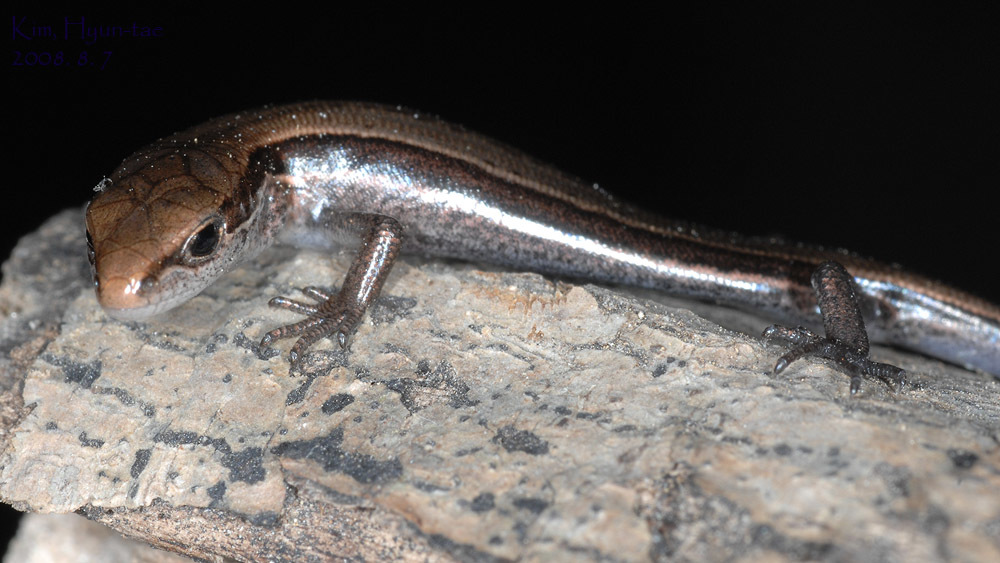
- S. huanrenensis in Odaesan National Park

Conservation status
- Critically Endangered (IUCN 3.1)

Scientific classification
- Domain: Eukaryota
- Kingdom: Animalia
- Phylum: Chordata
- Class: Reptilia
- Order: Squamata
- Family: Scincidae
- Genus: Scincella
- Species: S. huanrenensis

Binomial name
- Scincella huanrenensis Zhao & Huang, 1982

= Scincella huanrenensis =

Species of lizard

Scincella huanrenensis is a species of skink found in Liaoning in Northeast China and in Korea. The specific name refers to its type locality, Huanren County in Liaoning.
