= Scincella ochracea =

Conservation status
- Least Concern (IUCN 3.1)

Scientific classification
- Kingdom: Animalia
- Phylum: Chordata
- Class: Reptilia
- Order: Squamata
- Family: Scincidae
- Genus: Scincella
- Species: S. ochracea

Binomial name
- Scincella ochracea (Bourret, 1937)

Species of lizard

Scincella ochracea is a species of skink found in Vietnam.
