= Scincella kikaapoa =

Scientific classification
- Domain: Eukaryota
- Kingdom: Animalia
- Phylum: Chordata
- Class: Reptilia
- Order: Squamata
- Family: Scincidae
- Genus: Scincella
- Species: S. kikaapoa

Binomial name
- Scincella kikaapoa García-Vázquez, Canseco-Márquez, & Nieto-Montes de Oca, 2010

Species of lizard

Scincella kikaapoa is a species of skink endemic to Mexico. The specific name kikaapoa refers Kickapoo people from Coahuila, the region of the type locality of this species.
