= Scincella devorator =

Conservation status
- Data Deficient (IUCN 3.1)

Scientific classification
- Kingdom: Animalia
- Phylum: Chordata
- Class: Reptilia
- Order: Squamata
- Family: Scincidae
- Genus: Scincella
- Species: S. devorator

Binomial name
- Scincella devorator (Darevsky, Orlov & Cuc, 2004)

Synonyms
- Sphenomorphus devorator Darevsky, Orlov & Cuc, 2004

Species of lizard

Scincella devorator is a species of skink endemic to northern Vietnam.
