= Scincella przewalskii =

Conservation status
- Data Deficient (IUCN 3.1)

Scientific classification
- Kingdom: Animalia
- Phylum: Chordata
- Class: Reptilia
- Order: Squamata
- Family: Scincidae
- Genus: Scincella
- Species: S. przewalskii

Binomial name
- Scincella przewalskii (Bedriaga, 1912)

Synonyms
- Lygosoma Przewalskii Bedriaga, 1912

Species of lizard

Scincella przewalskii is a species of skink. It is endemic to Gansu province in Northwest China.
