= Pù Hu bent-toed gecko =

Scientific classification
- Kingdom: Animalia
- Phylum: Chordata
- Class: Reptilia
- Order: Squamata
- Suborder: Gekkota
- Family: Gekkonidae
- Genus: Cyrtodactylus
- Species: C. puhuensis

Binomial name
- Cyrtodactylus puhuensis Nguyen, Yang, Le, Nguyen, Orlov, Hoang, Nguyen, Jin, Rao, Hoang, Che, Murphy, & Zhang, 2014

Species of lizard

The Pù Hu bent-toed gecko (Cyrtodactylus puhuensis) is a species of gecko that is endemic to Vietnam.
