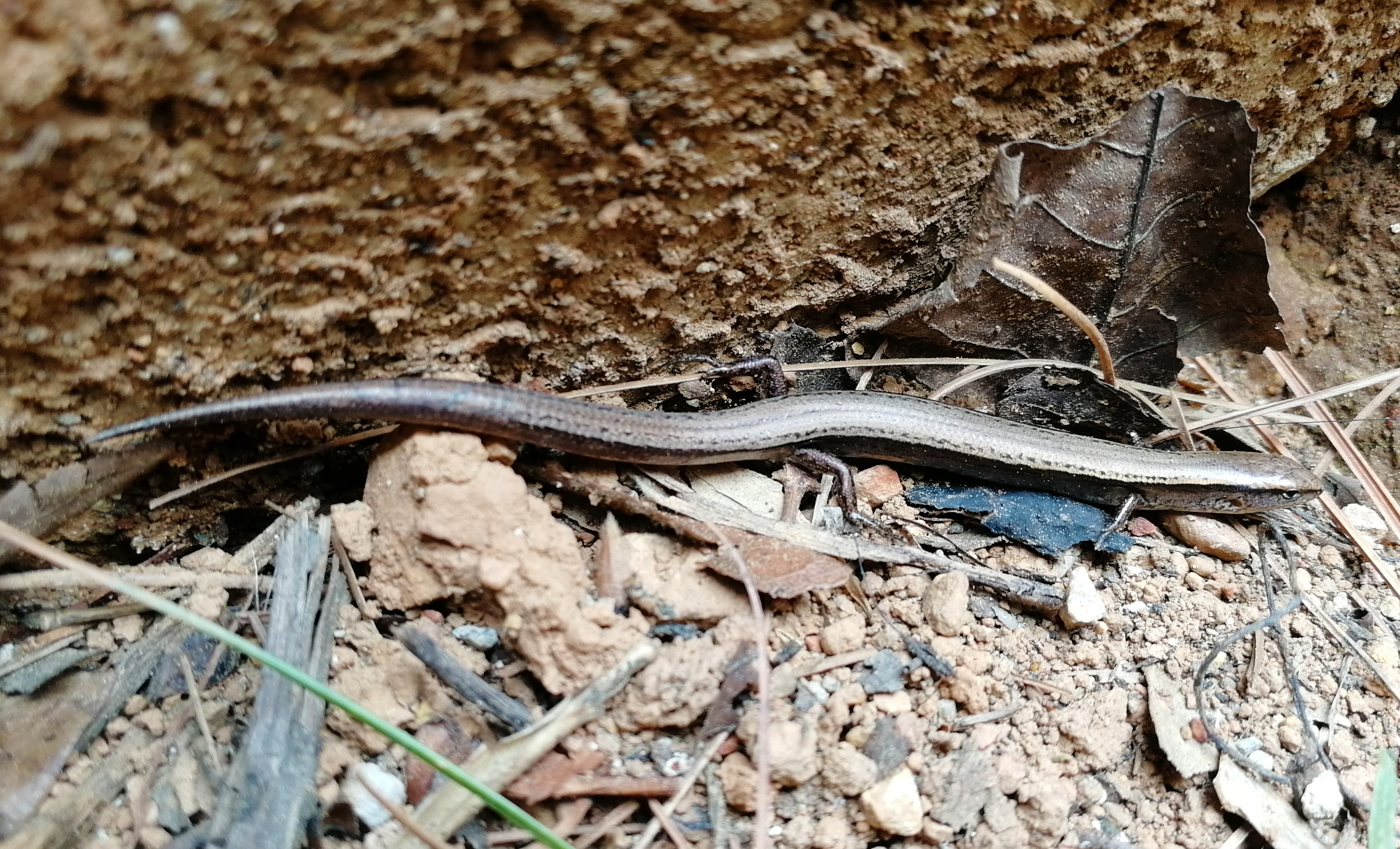

Conservation status
- Least Concern (IUCN 3.1)

Scientific classification
- Kingdom: Animalia
- Phylum: Chordata
- Class: Reptilia
- Order: Squamata
- Family: Scincidae
- Genus: Scincella
- Species: S. barbouri

Binomial name
- Scincella barbouri (Stejneger, 1925)

Synonyms
- Leiolopisma barbouri Stejneger, 1925; Scincella barbouri — Greer, 1974

= Scincella barbouri =

Species of lizard

Scincella barbouri, also known commonly as Barbour's ground skink, is a species of lizard in the family Scincidae. The species is endemic to China.

== Etymology ==
The specific name, barbouri, is in honor of American herpetologist Thomas Barbour.

== Geographic range ==
S. barbouri is found in Yunnan province, southwestern China. It may possibly also occur in adjacent Sichuan province.

== Habitat ==
The preferred natural habitat of S. barbouri is shrubland, at altitudes of 1,800–2,500 m (5,900–8,200 ft).

== Reproduction ==
S. barbouri is oviparous.
