= Scincella potanini =

Conservation status
- Least Concern (IUCN 3.1)

Scientific classification
- Kingdom: Animalia
- Phylum: Chordata
- Class: Reptilia
- Order: Squamata
- Suborder: Scinciformata
- Infraorder: Scincomorpha
- Family: Sphenomorphidae
- Genus: Scincella
- Species: S. potanini

Binomial name
- Scincella potanini (Günther, 1896)

Species of lizard

Scincella potanini is a species of skink found in China.
