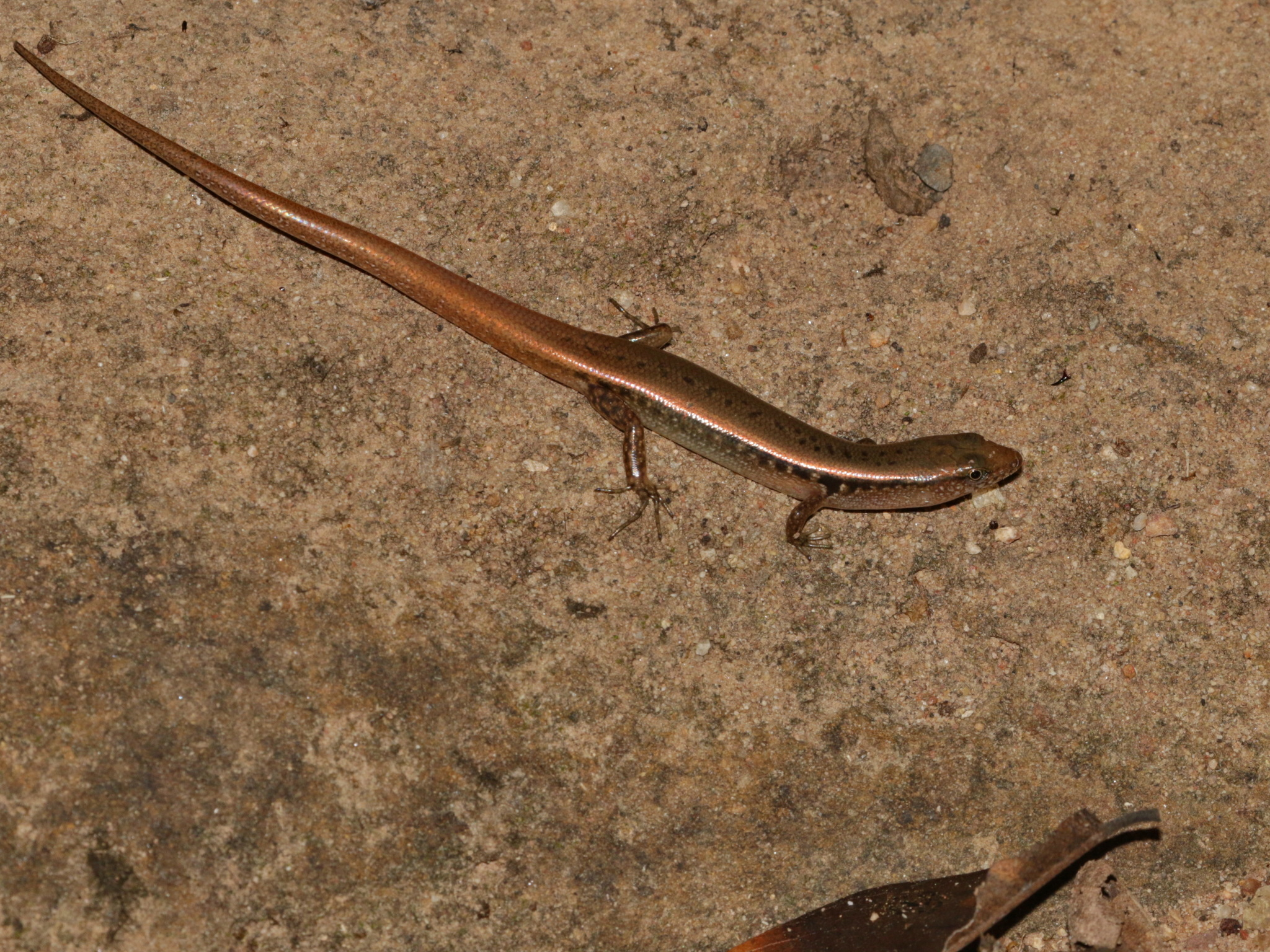

Conservation status
- Least Concern (IUCN 3.1)

Scientific classification
- Kingdom: Animalia
- Phylum: Chordata
- Class: Reptilia
- Order: Squamata
- Suborder: Scinciformata
- Infraorder: Scincomorpha
- Family: Sphenomorphidae
- Genus: Scincella
- Species: S. rupicola

Binomial name
- Scincella rupicola (Smith, 1916)

= Scincella rupicola =

Species of lizard

Scincella rupicola is a species of skink found in Vietnam.
