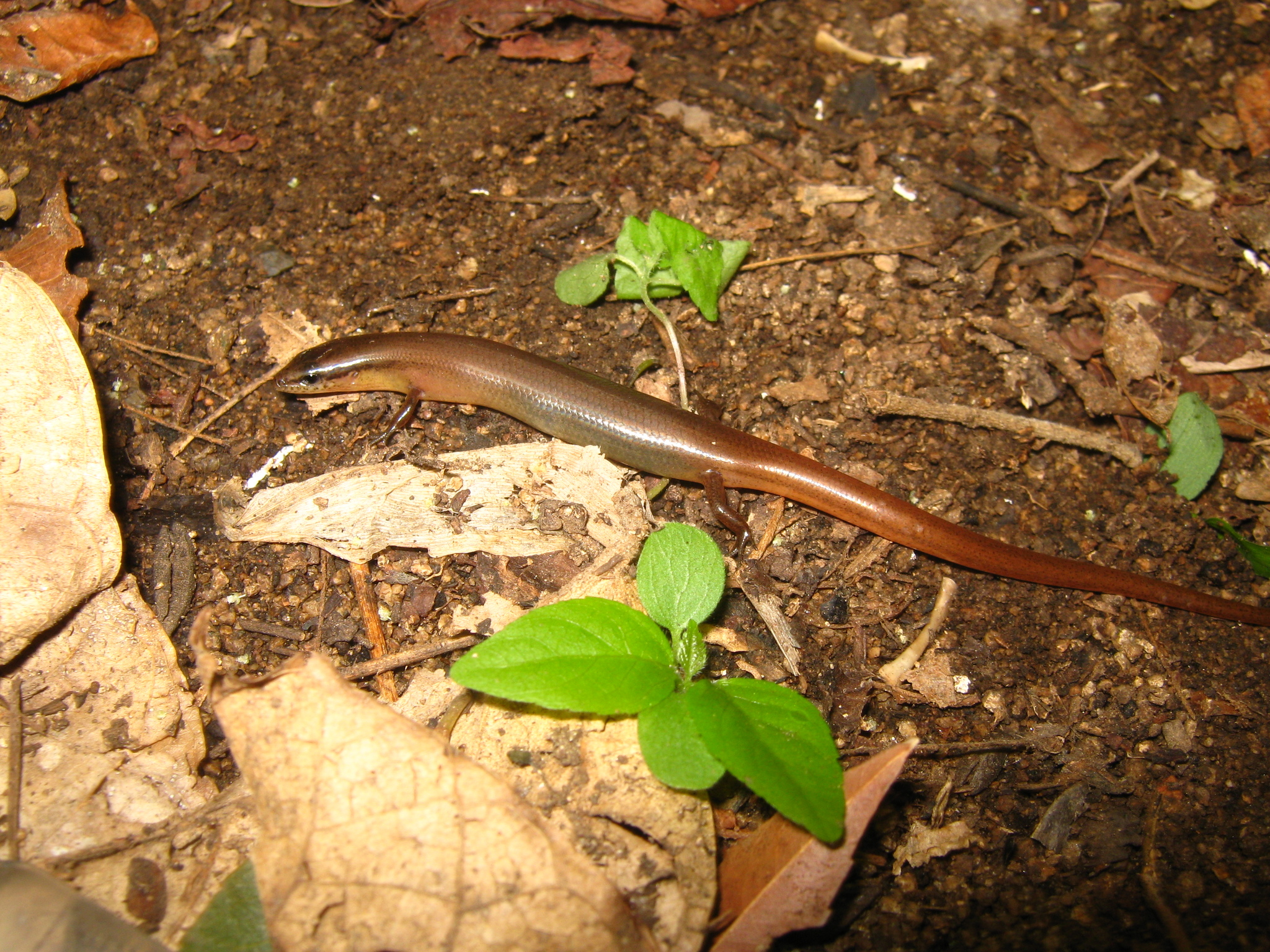

Conservation status
- Least Concern (IUCN 3.1)

Scientific classification
- Kingdom: Animalia
- Phylum: Chordata
- Class: Reptilia
- Order: Squamata
- Suborder: Scinciformata
- Infraorder: Scincomorpha
- Family: Sphenomorphidae
- Genus: Scincella
- Species: S. assata

Binomial name
- Scincella assata (Cope, 1864)

= Scincella assata =

Species of lizard

The red forest skink (Scincella assata) is a species of skink found in Mexico, Guatemala, El Salvador, Nicaragua, and Honduras.
