= Scincella rufocaudata =

Scientific classification
- Kingdom: Animalia
- Phylum: Chordata
- Class: Reptilia
- Order: Squamata
- Family: Scincidae
- Genus: Scincella
- Species: S. rufocaudata

Binomial name
- Scincella rufocaudata (Darevsky & Van Sang, 1983)

Species of lizard

Scincella rufocaudata, the red-tailed ground skink, is a species of skink found in Vietnam and Cambodia.
