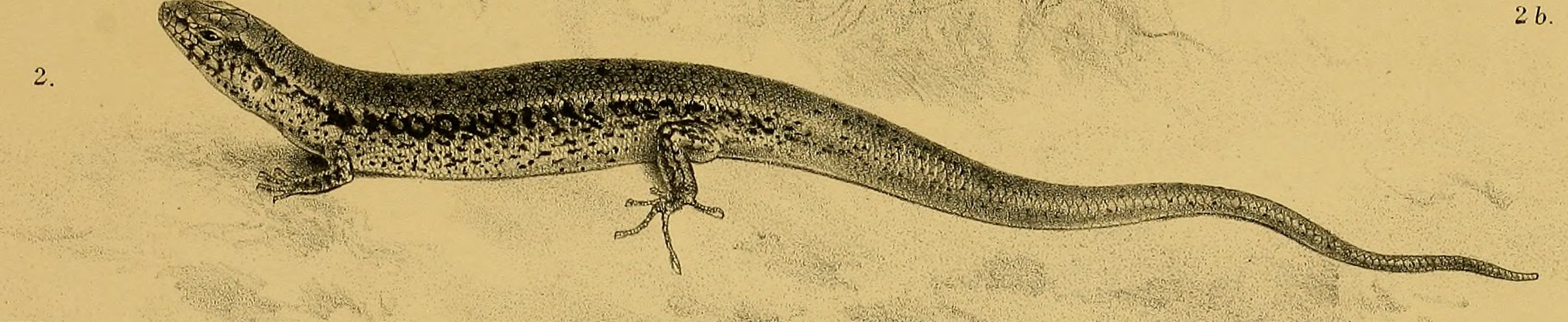

Conservation status
- Least Concern (IUCN 3.1)

Scientific classification
- Kingdom: Animalia
- Phylum: Chordata
- Class: Reptilia
- Order: Squamata
- Family: Scincidae
- Genus: Scincella
- Species: S. melanosticta

Binomial name
- Scincella melanosticta (Boulenger, 1887)

Synonyms
- Lygosoma melanostictum Boulenger 1887; Lygosoma melanosticum (sic!) Smith 1916; Lygosoma reevesi melanosticum Smith 1935; Leiolopisma siamensis TAYLOR & Elbel 1958; Leiolopisma melanostictum Taylor 1963; Leiolopisma siamensis Taylor 1963; Scincella melanosticta Greer 1974; Scincella siamensis Greer 1974; Scincella melanosticta Manthey & Grossmann 1997; Scincella melanosticta Linkem, Diesmos & Brown 2011; Scincella melanosticta kohtaoensis (Cochran 1927); Leiolopisma kohtaoensis Cochran 1927; Leiolopisma kohtaoensis Taylor 1963; Scincella kohtaoensis Greer 1974; Scincella melanosticta kohtaoensis Ouboter 1986; Scincella kohtaoensis Shea & Greer 2002

= Scincella melanosticta =

Species of lizard

Scincella melanosticta, also known as black ground skink or black-spotted smooth skink, is a species of skink in the genus of Scincella. It is found in Myanmar, Thailand, Vietnam, Cambodia, and possibly also in Laos.
