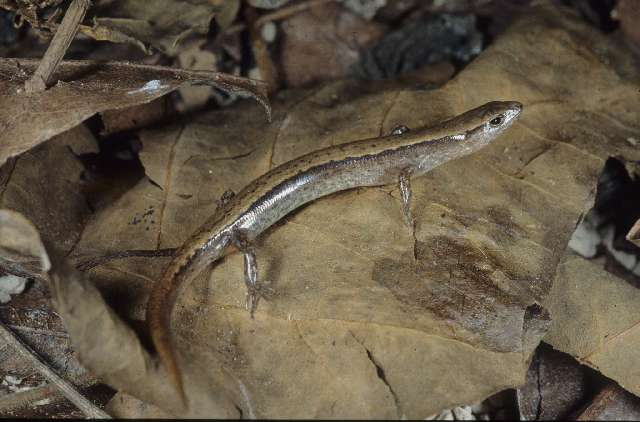

Conservation status
- Least Concern (IUCN 3.1)

Scientific classification
- Kingdom: Animalia
- Phylum: Chordata
- Class: Reptilia
- Order: Squamata
- Suborder: Scinciformata
- Infraorder: Scincomorpha
- Family: Sphenomorphidae
- Genus: Scincella
- Species: S. formosensis

Binomial name
- Scincella formosensis (Van Denburgh, 1912)

Synonyms
- Leiolopisma laterale formosensis Van Denburgh, 1912; Lygosoma laterale var. formosensis Thompson, 1912; Lygosoma formosensis Thompson, 1912

= Scincella formosensis =

Species of lizard

Scincella formosensis, also known as Van Denburgh's ground skink, is a species of skink endemic to Taiwan.
