= Scincella nigrofasciata =

Scientific classification
- Domain: Eukaryota
- Kingdom: Animalia
- Phylum: Chordata
- Class: Reptilia
- Order: Squamata
- Family: Scincidae
- Genus: Scincella
- Species: S. nigrofasciata

Binomial name
- Scincella nigrofasciata Neang, Chan, & Poyarkov, 2018

Species of lizard

Scincella nigrofasciata is a species of skink found in Cambodia.
