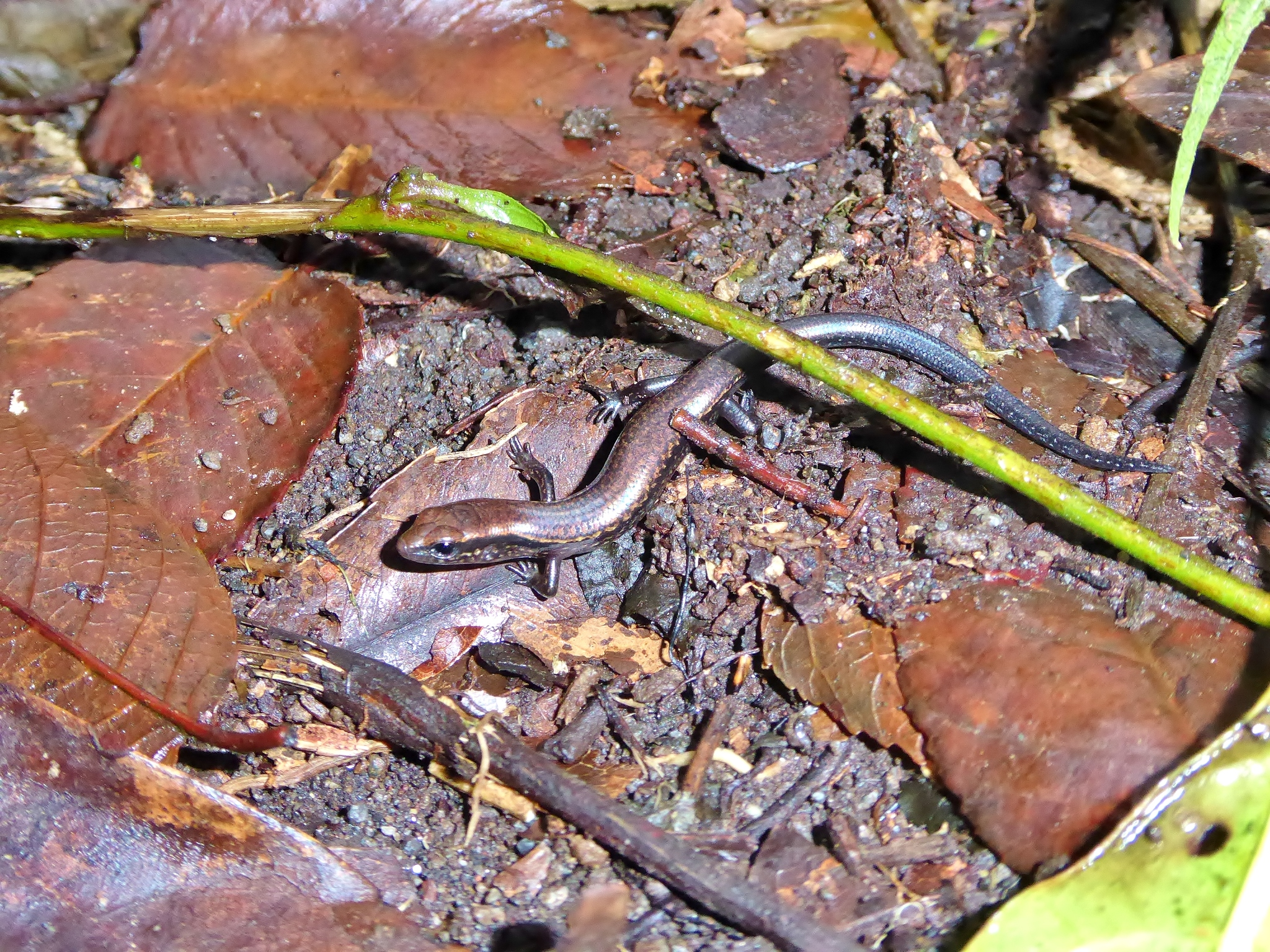

Conservation status
- Least Concern (IUCN 3.1)

Scientific classification
- Domain: Eukaryota
- Kingdom: Animalia
- Phylum: Chordata
- Class: Reptilia
- Order: Squamata
- Family: Scincidae
- Genus: Scincella
- Species: S. incerta

Binomial name
- Scincella incerta (Stuart, 1940)

= Scincella incerta =

Species of lizard

Scincella incerta is a species of skink found in southern Mexico, Guatemala, and Honduras, although records from Mexico likely pertain to another species.
