= Scincella wangyuezhaoi =

Scientific classification
- Kingdom: Animalia
- Phylum: Chordata
- Class: Reptilia
- Order: Squamata
- Family: Scincidae
- Genus: Scincella
- Species: S. wangyuezhaoi

Binomial name
- Scincella wangyuezhaoi Jia, Gao, Huang, Ren, Jiang, & Li, 2023

Species of lizard

Scincella wangyuezhaoi, Wenchuan's ground skink, is a species of skink found in China.
