= Scincella capitanea =

Scientific classification
- Domain: Eukaryota
- Kingdom: Animalia
- Phylum: Chordata
- Class: Reptilia
- Order: Squamata
- Family: Scincidae
- Genus: Scincella
- Species: S. capitanea

Binomial name
- Scincella capitanea Ouboter, 1986

Species of skink found in Nepal

Scincella capitanea, the large ground skink, is a species of skink endemic to Nepal.
