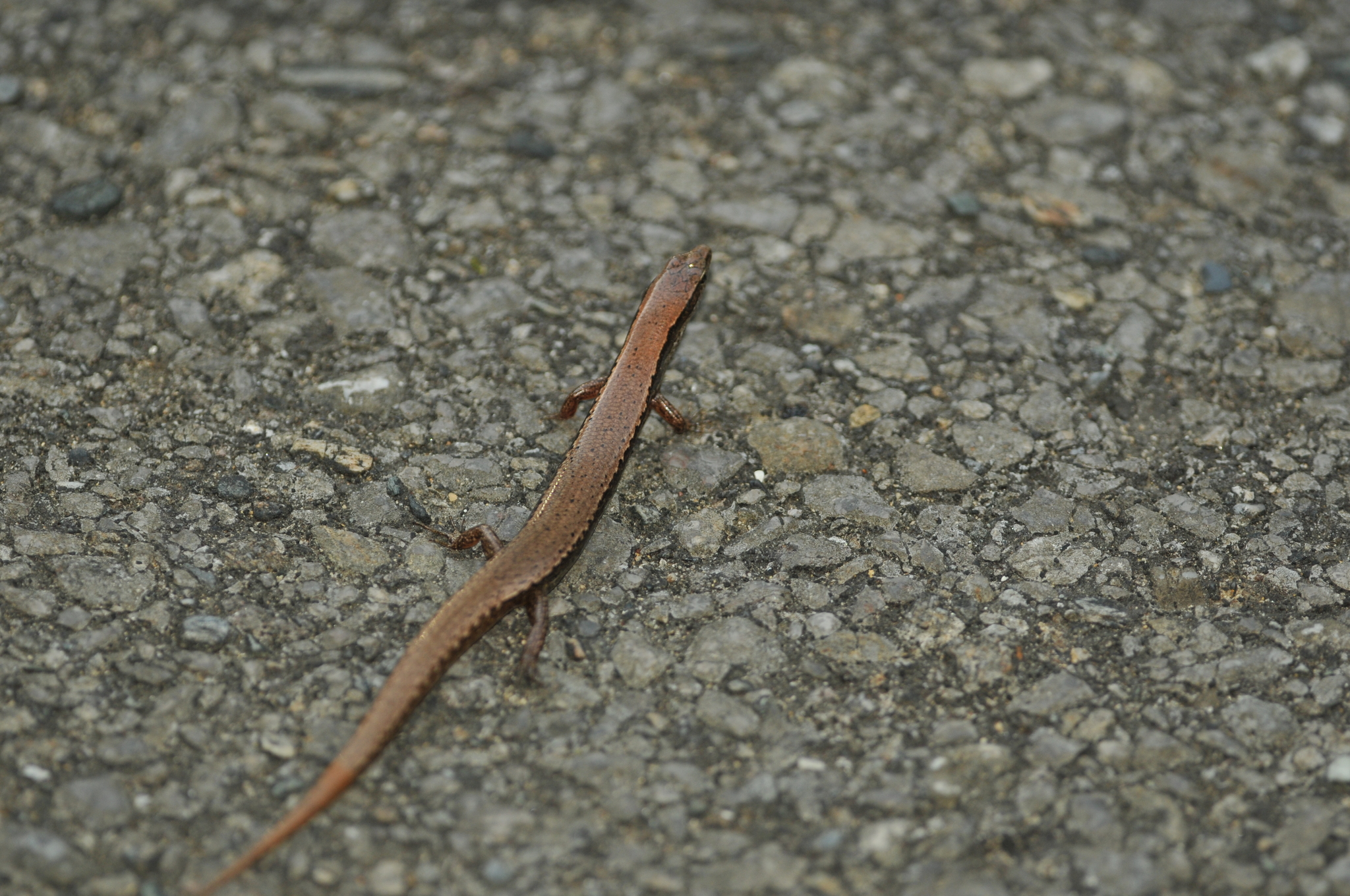

Conservation status
- Least Concern (IUCN 3.1)

Scientific classification
- Kingdom: Animalia
- Phylum: Chordata
- Class: Reptilia
- Order: Squamata
- Family: Scincidae
- Genus: Scincella
- Species: S. boettgeri

Binomial name
- Scincella boettgeri (Van Denburgh, 1912)

Synonyms
- Leiolopisma laterale boettgeri Van Denburgh, 1912; Scincella boettgeri — Schmidt, 1927; Lygosoma reevesii boettgeri — Nakamura & Uéno, 1963; Scincella boettgeri — Greer, 1974

= Scincella boettgeri =

Species of lizard

Scincella boettgeri, Boettger's ground skink, is a species of lizard in the family Scincidae. The species is native to the Ryukyu Islands of Japan.

== Etymology ==
The specific name, boettgeri, is in honor of German herpetologist Oskar Boettger.

== Geographic range ==
S. boettgeri is found in the Miyako and Yaeyama island groups of the southern Ryukyu Islands.

== Habitat ==
The preferred natural habitat of S. boettgeri is forest.

== Behavior ==
S. boettgeri is terrestrial.

== Diet ==
S. boettgeri preys upon insects and spiders.

== Reproduction ==
S. boettgeri is oviparous. Clutch size is 4–11 eggs.
