= Scincella forbesorum =

Scientific classification
- Kingdom: Animalia
- Phylum: Chordata
- Class: Reptilia
- Order: Squamata
- Family: Scincidae
- Genus: Scincella
- Species: S. forbesorum

Binomial name
- Scincella forbesorum (Taylor, 1937)

Synonyms
- Leiolopisma forbesorum Taylor, 1937; Scincella gemmingeri forbesorum — H.M. Smith & Taylor, 1950; Scincella forbesorum — Shea & Greer, 2002

Species of lizard

Scincella forbesorum, also known commonly as Forbes' forest ground skink and la escíncela de bosque de Forbes in Mexican Spanish, is a species of lizard in the family Scincidae. The species is endemic to Mexico.

== Etymology ==
The specific name, forbesorum (genitive plural), is in honor of Mr. and Mrs. Dyfrig McHattie Forbes, Mexican planters who assisted visiting herpetologists.

== Geographic range ==
S. forbesorum is known only from the Mexican state of Hidalgo in eastern central Mexico.

== Habitat ==
The preferred natural habitat of S. forbesorum is forest, to which the common names refer. The holotype was collected at an altitude of 7,000 ft (2,100 m).

== Reproduction ==
The mode of reproduction of S. forbesorum is unknown.
