= Scincella tsinlingensis =

Conservation status
- Least Concern (IUCN 3.1)

Scientific classification
- Kingdom: Animalia
- Phylum: Chordata
- Class: Reptilia
- Order: Squamata
- Family: Scincidae
- Genus: Scincella
- Species: S. tsinlingensis

Binomial name
- Scincella tsinlingensis (Hu & Zhou, 1966)

Species of lizard

Scincella tsinlingensis is a species of skink found in China.
