= Lateralis =

Lateralis may refer to:

- Vastus lateralis muscle, the largest part of the Quadriceps femoris

== See also ==
- Lateralus, an album by Tool
