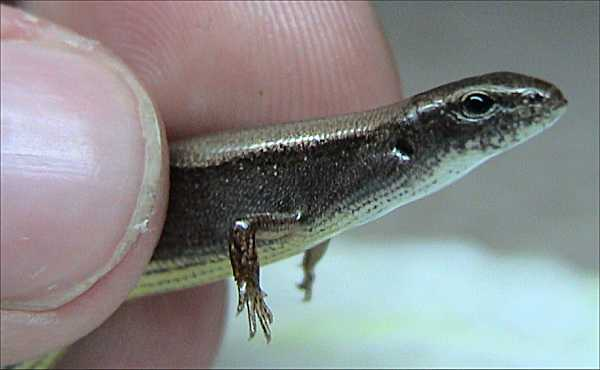

Conservation status
- Least Concern (IUCN 3.1)

Scientific classification
- Kingdom: Animalia
- Phylum: Chordata
- Class: Reptilia
- Order: Squamata
- Family: Scincidae
- Genus: Scincella
- Species: S. lateralis

Binomial name
- Scincella lateralis (Say, 1823)
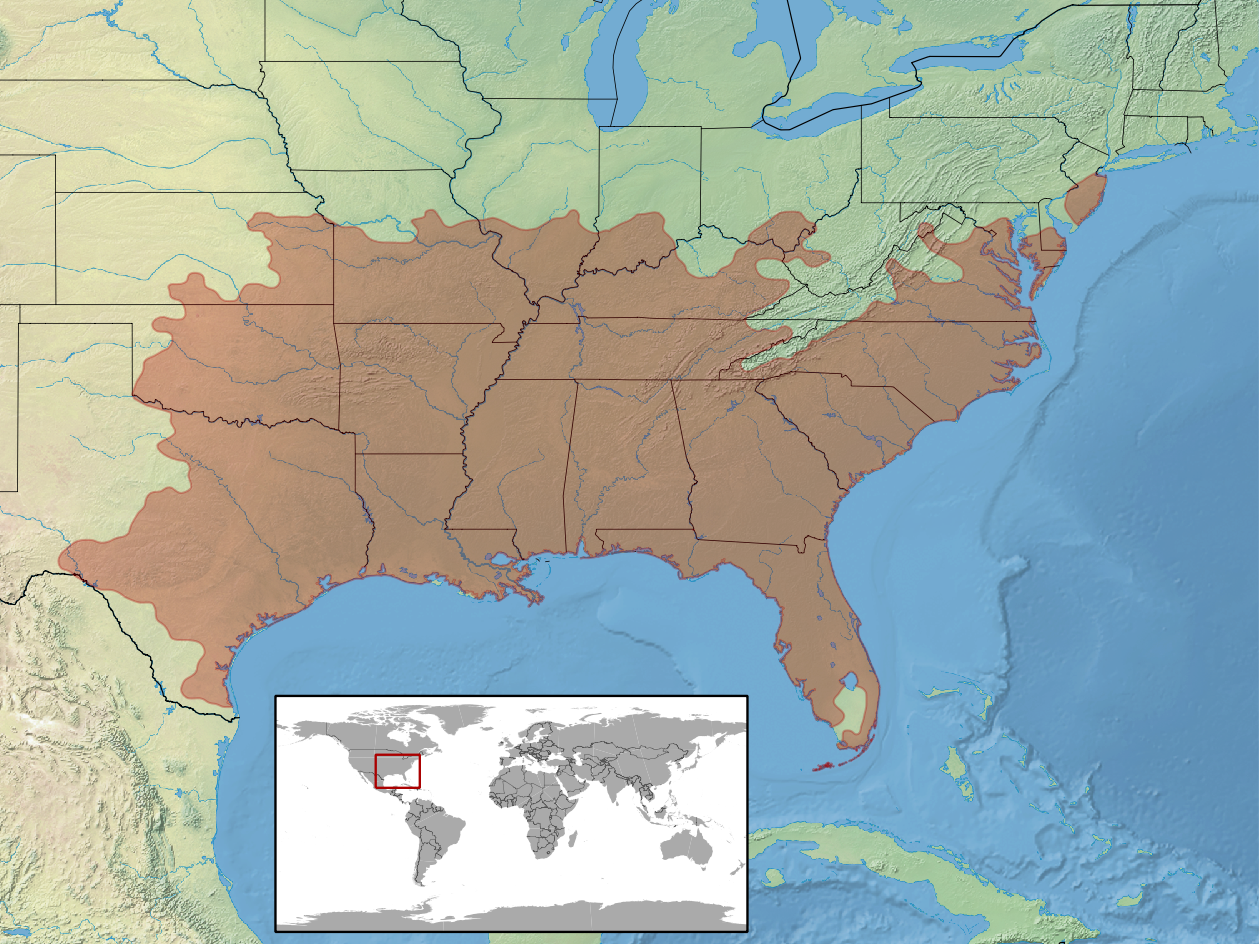

Synonyms
- Scincus lateralis Say, 1823; Scincus unicolor Harlan, 1825; Lygosoma lateralis — A.M.C. Duméril & Bibron, 1839; Leiolopisma laterale — Lönnberg, 1894; Leiolopisma unicolor — Burt, 1935; Scincella laterale — Mittleman, 1950; Scincella lateralis — H.M. Smith & Taylor, 1950

= Scincella lateralis =

Species of lizard

Scincella lateralis, formerly Lygosoma laterale is a small species of skink found throughout much of the eastern half of the United States, and into northern Mexico. The ground skink differs from the majority of North American lizard species in that it is generally considered a forest dweller. Common names for this species include the little brown skink and the ground skink. However, the common name, ground skink, may refer to any species in the genus Scincella.

== Description ==
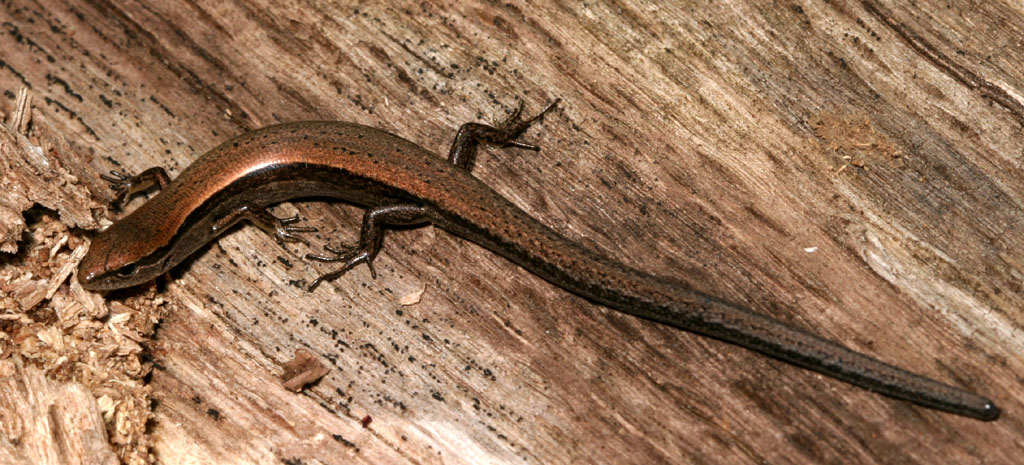
dorsal view

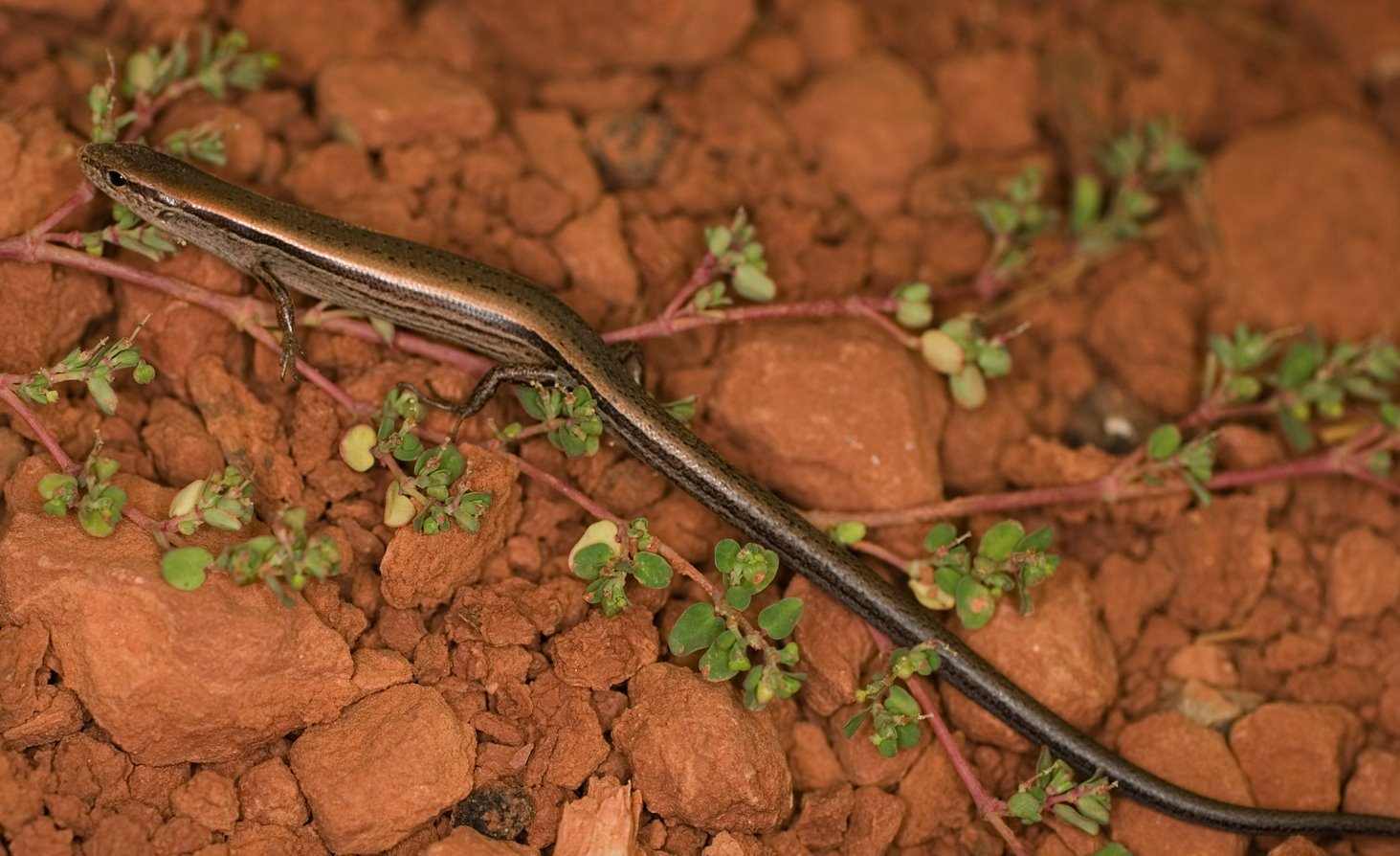
Cleveland County, Oklahoma.

The little brown skink is one of the smallest reptiles in North America, with a total length (including tail) of only 3 - 5.5 inches (7.5 - 14.5 cm)and 1 to 2 grams in body mass. Its back is typically a coppery brown color with a white or yellow underside, dark coloration running laterally from eyes to tail and like most skinks has an elongated body and short legs. Transparent disks in the lower eyelids allow it to see with its eyes closed (Beane 2006, Palmer et al. 1995). Females tend to grow faster and be larger than males. Teeth size and amount for this species is more strongly correlated with snout-vent length than head size. Scincella lateralis exhibits sexual dimorphism where the females are generally larger, but males have larger heads. This is suggested that this may be the result of sexual selection favoring larger heads in males in male-male contests. Males heads may also become more orange in color.

== Geographic range ==
The ground skink is found throughout much of the Eastern United States, from New Jersey, Ohio , and Kansas south to Texas and Florida, as well as into northern Mexico, and found along the Atlantic coast This species of skink is one of the most abundant skinks living in southeastern America. More recently, it has been sighted in southern New York State. It has also been seen in isolated regions such as central Illinois. It is absent from higher elevations in the Appalachian Mountains. It is one of the most abundant and widely distributed members of the skink family. Although the geographic range stretches wide, there is little geographic variation within the species.

== Habitat ==
S. lateralis lives in a variety of habitats, including deciduous or mixed deciduous/coniferous forests, hedgerows, palmetto hammocks,, coastal plains, and the edges of streams and ponds. It does require a deep substrate, such as leaf litter. They rely on ground cover for protection and moisture.Known to occasionally shelter in Sabal palmettos.

Some evidence suggests that meander cutoff may promote gene flow across a riverine barrier in Ground skinks. Several genetic discontinuities align with major southeastern rivers and rivers may have historically isolated populations. However, phylogeographic evidence suggests that some gene flow is occurring across the rivers, and especially the Mississippi River. The meander loop cutoff mechanism may allow passive dispersal to take place across the barrier.

== Behavior ==
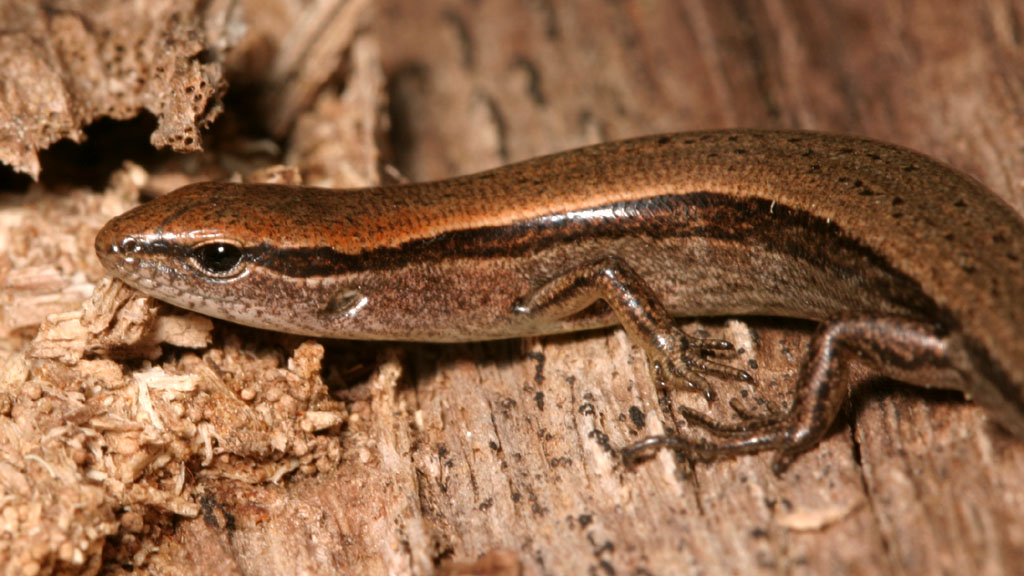
lateral view

The ground skink is a fossorial species, spending the majority of its time buried in leaf litter on the forest floor. Unlike other skinks, it seldom climbs trees. Its usual means of locomotion is to wriggle through the leaf litter with undulating movements. It may dive under water when pursued, although normally avoids wet areas. It is largely diurnal, but may be active at night as well. It hibernates during the coldest months, but may be active in almost any month of the year in North Carolina (Palmer et al. 1995). As befits a tiny lizard, the home range of an individual may be as small as 20 square meters (Natureserve). Ground skinks exhibit tail autotomy when seized which distracts the predator and allows the ground skink to escape. The tail will later regrow. However, once the tail is dropped there is a marked drop in their escape speed (38 to 28 cm/s) and fleeing distance (152 cm with tail, 9 cm without tail). Males are more aggressive than females and are known to bite. Due to males being more aggressive, they often times have a larger head than females. This difference is known as sexual dimorphism and gives the males an advantage when competing for females, attacking larger females, and defending itself from predators. Following confrontation, dominant males will lunge at and chase away subordinate males to secure retreat/hide access. The aggressiveness seen in adults is not shared in neonates, instead they are docile and may share retreats. A field study conducted showed that S. lateralis with lower body temperatures fled earlier in predatory events when the predator was farther away than did warmer animal. Unlike other forest dwelling lizards, S. lateralis is an effective thermoregulator, changing the timings of its activity in response to daily temperature fluctuations and conditions.

== Diet ==
The diet of the little brown skink consists of small insects, spiders, and other arthropoda, such as isopods. The active foraging of a ground skink is assisted by their ability to discriminate prey chemicals and "smells" by tongue-flicking. This is one of their two main methods of locating prey: visual and chemical senses. A visual incentive is associated with tongue flicking, orientation to the prey, and attack behavior. When the visual aspect of the prey is removed, then the amount of tongue flicking increases to an even greater rate.

== As prey ==
Ground skinks are, in turn, preyed upon by snakes such as the eastern racer, ringneck snake, scarlet kingsnake and pigmy rattlesnake (Sistrurus miliarius). Predatory birds of woodland habitats, such as the barred owl and the red-shouldered hawk, also feed upon ground skinks. Even the eastern bluebird has been observed feeding on this tiny lizard (Palmer et al.2008, Robert Brooks 2009). Wolf spiders have also been seen as potential predators, as they are found in the same habitat and utilize similarly limited resources. To prevent predation ground skinks will use their cryptic coloration to hide, if that fails they will run away, as a final defence they will practice tail autotomy or tail dropping. The skink will also fight back and sometimes lunge and chase as a form of defense. They are great at hiding and often use things like leaf litter, logs, and even small holes as cover from predators.Ground skinks are often parasitized by many species of nematodes and arthropods.

== Reproduction ==
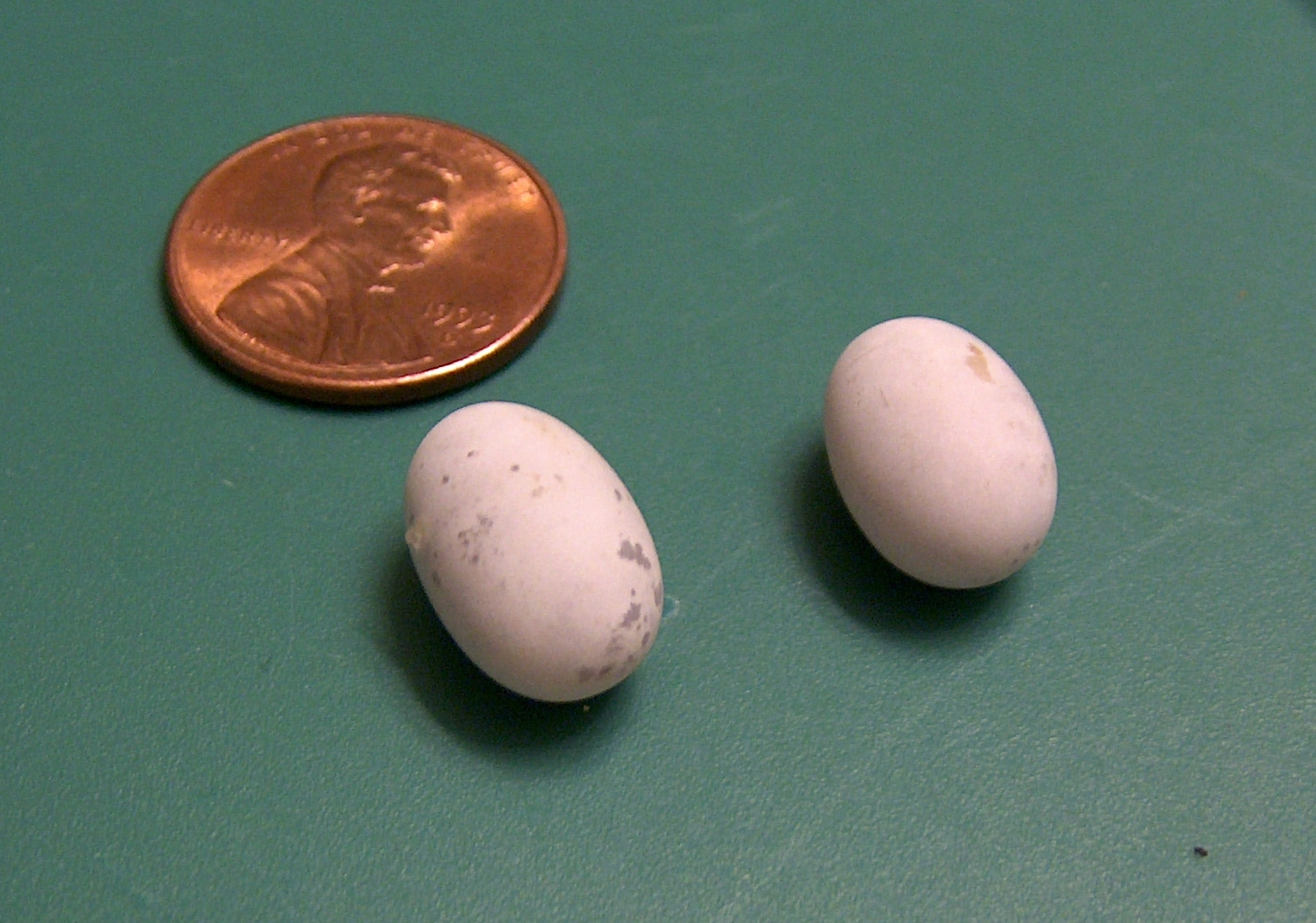
Ground skink eggs.

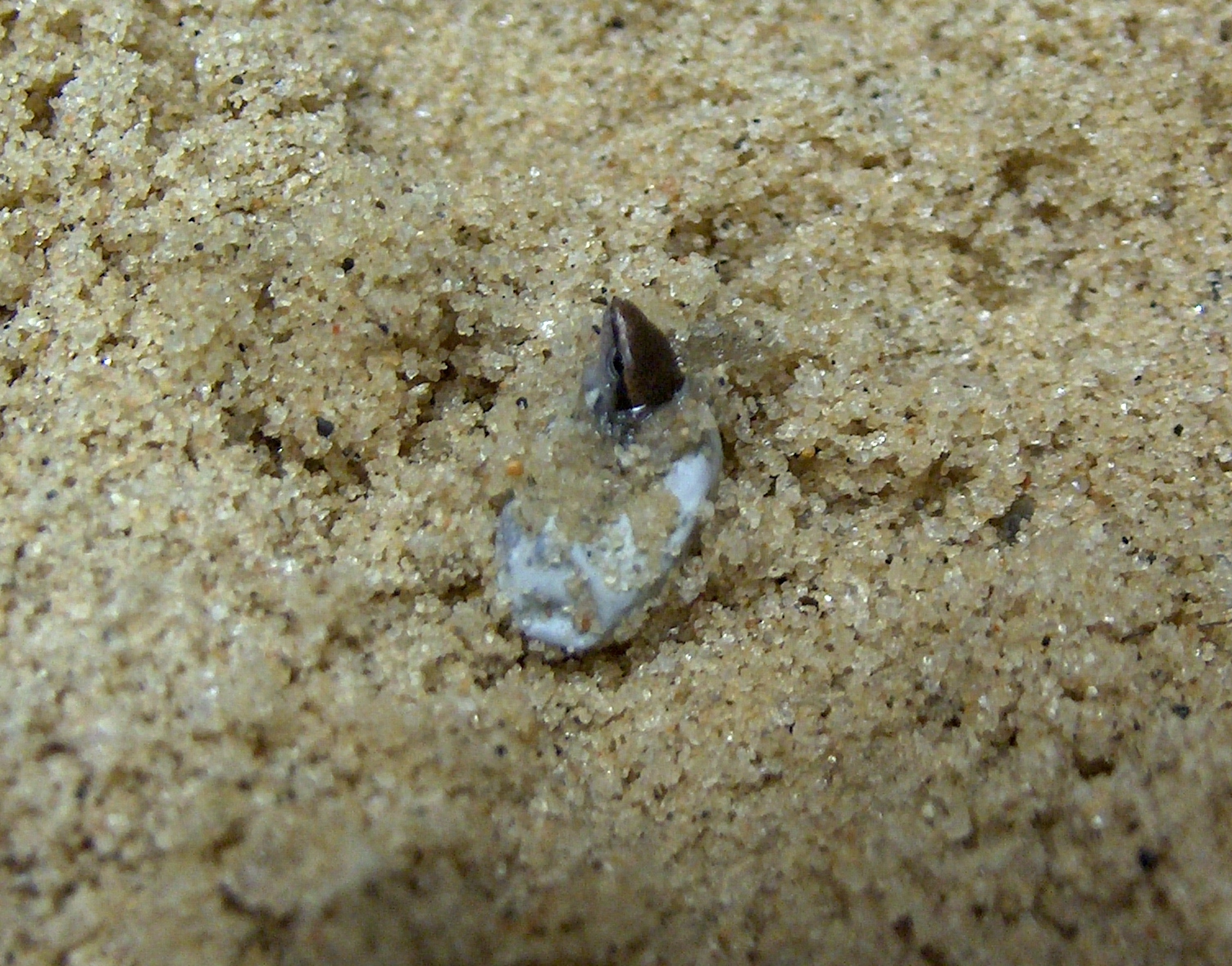
Ground skink hatching.

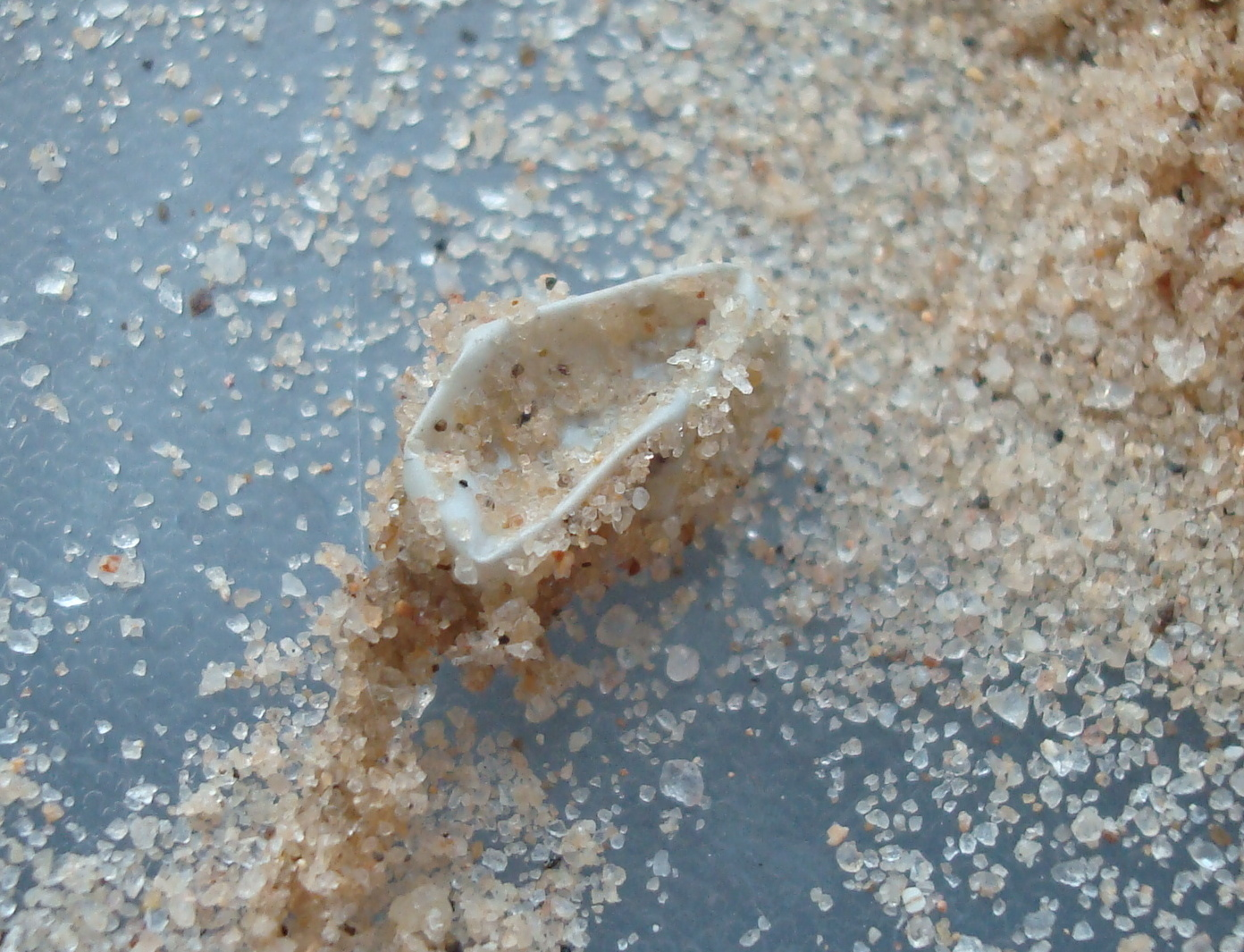
Ground skink egg after hatching.

Sexually mature S. lateralis females lay small clutches of 1-6 (usually 2-3) eggs in moist soil, rotting logs, falling logs, or under rocks. Eggs are laid during the summer, March through August in the Southern United States. There may be more than one clutch per year. In contrast to Eumeces species, the female ground skink does not guard its eggs (Robert Brooks 2009). Eggs hatch in one to two months, and young are sexually mature at one year of age. Females generally become sexually mature earlier than males.

== Conservation status ==
The little brown skink is a widespread and common species in most of its range. It is of conservation concern only on the northern edge of its range and can be seen in grassland or forest.
