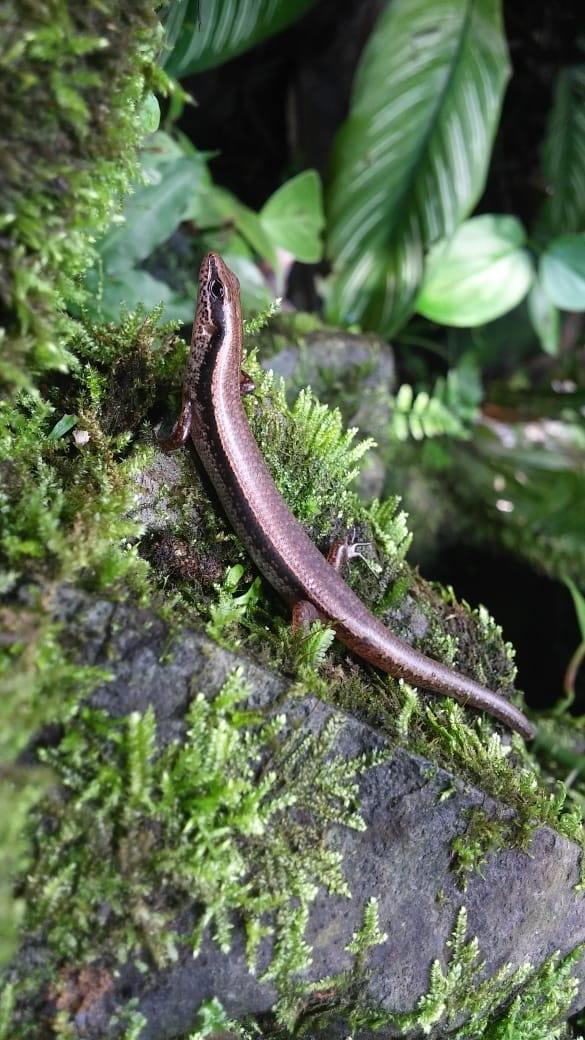

Conservation status
- Least Concern (IUCN 3.1)

Scientific classification
- Kingdom: Animalia
- Phylum: Chordata
- Class: Reptilia
- Order: Squamata
- Family: Scincidae
- Genus: Scincella
- Species: S. silvicola

Binomial name
- Scincella silvicola (Taylor, 1937)
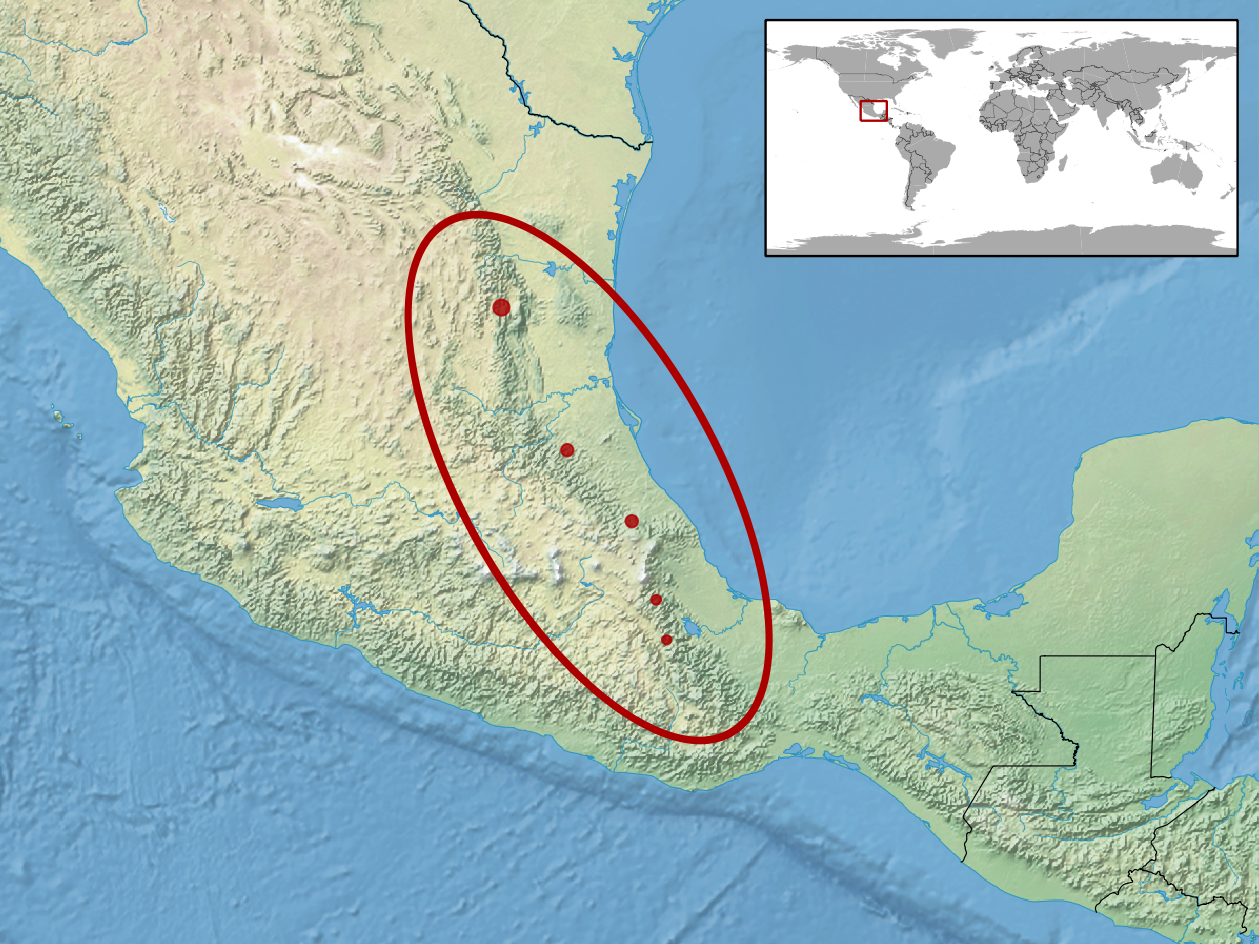

= Scincella silvicola =

Species of lizard

Scincella silvicola is a species of skink that lives in the southern Sierra Madre Oriental and northern Sierra Madre de Oaxaca of Mexico, from Puebla to Oaxaca. It occurs primarily in dry, scrubby areas and forests, especially pine forests. It is generally a common species and faces no major threats. It is most likely ovoviviparous.

Like all members of the genus Scincella, S. silvicola is long and cylindrical, with short limbs. Its color is light bronze or cream, and it has a dark stripe originating at the snout and running dorsolaterally across its body. Its maximum snout-vent length is about 53 millimeters.
