= Scincella rara =

Conservation status
- Data Deficient (IUCN 3.1)

Scientific classification
- Kingdom: Animalia
- Phylum: Chordata
- Class: Reptilia
- Order: Squamata
- Family: Scincidae
- Genus: Scincella
- Species: S. rara

Binomial name
- Scincella rara (Darevsky & Orlov, 1997)

Synonyms
- Paralipinia rara Darevsky & Orlov, 1997

Species of lizard

Scincella rara, the double subdigital-pads skink, is a species of skink, only known to live in Central Truong Son, Vietnam. It is a small skink with arboreal mode of life.
