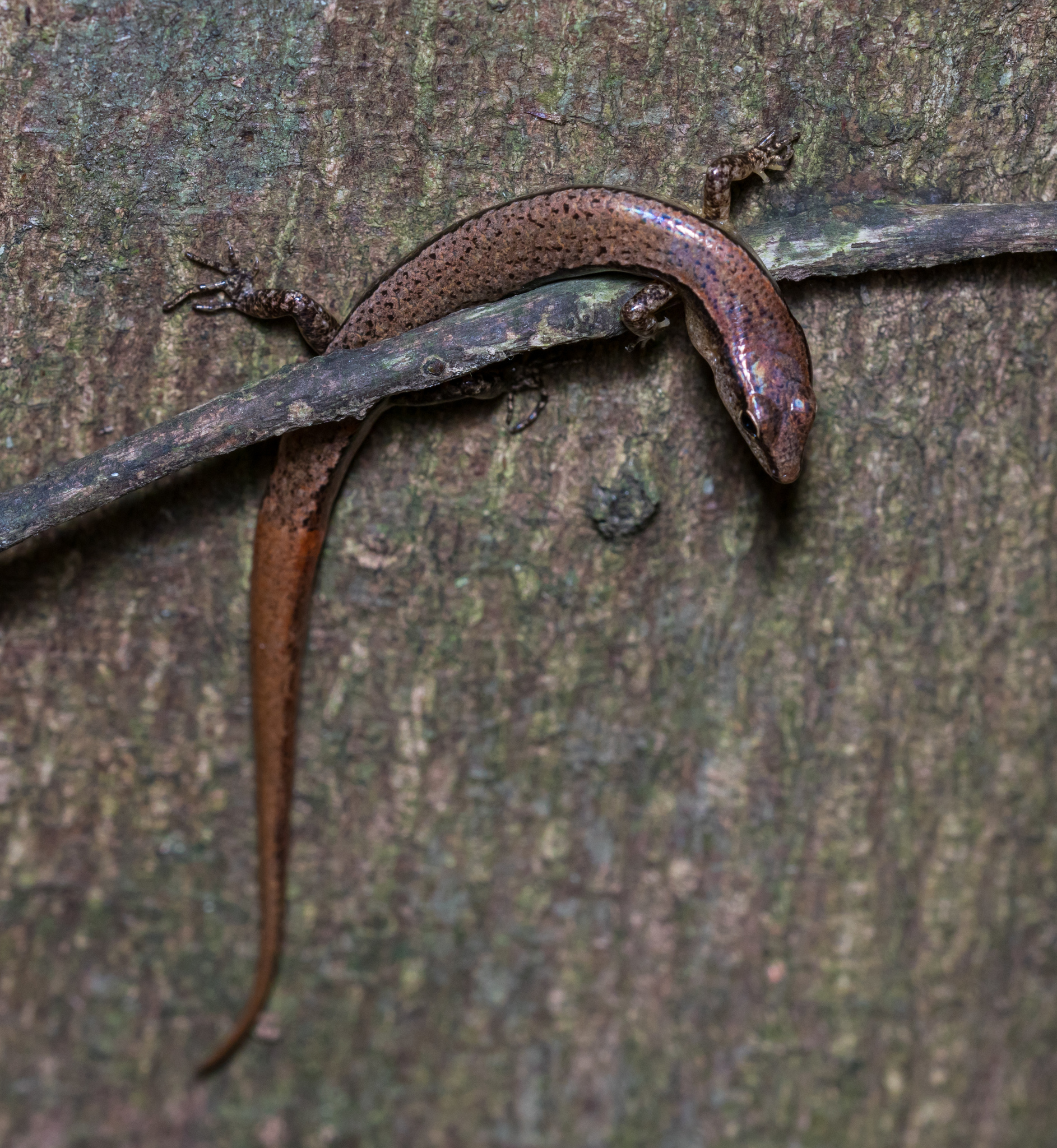

Scientific classification
- Domain: Eukaryota
- Kingdom: Animalia
- Phylum: Chordata
- Class: Reptilia
- Order: Squamata
- Family: Scincidae
- Genus: Scincella
- Species: S. modesta

Binomial name
- Scincella modesta (Günther, 1864)

= Scincella modesta =

Species of lizard

The modest ground skink (Scincella modesta) is a species of skink found in China.
