= Nikolai Liutsianovich Orlov =

Russian herpetologist (1952–2026)

Nikolai Orlov
- Николай Орлов
- Born: 12 June 1952; Cherkasy, Ukrainian SSR, Soviet Union
- Died: 25 March 2026 (aged 73)
- Education: Leningrad Pedagogical Institute
- Alma mater: Leningrad Pedagogical Institute
- Known for: Studies of Southeast Asian herpetofauna, especially northern Annam
- Scientific career
- Fields: Herpetology
- Institutions: Zoological Institute of the Russian Academy of Sciences
- Thesis: Fauna of Amphibians of Vietnam: Distribution, Taxonomic and Ecological Diversity (2006)
- Academic advisors: Ilya Sergeyevich Darevsky
- Author abbrev. (zoology): Orlov

Nikolai Liutsianovich Orlov (Russian: Николай Люцианович Орлов; 12 June 1952 – 25 March 2026) was a Soviet and Russian herpetologist and researcher of the herpetofauna of Southeast Asia, particularly northern Annam.

== Life and career ==
From 1970 to 1978 Orlov worked in the Department of Herpetology of the Leningrad Zoo. Since 1978 he has been employed at the Laboratory of Ornithology and Herpetology of the Zoological Institute of the Academy of Sciences of the USSR (now the Zoological Institute of the Russian Academy of Sciences).

In 1985 he graduated from the Leningrad Pedagogical Institute. In 1997 he became a junior research associate, and by 2021 he was a leading researcher at the Zoological Institute of the RAS.

In 2006 he defended his Candidate of Biological Sciences dissertation on the topic “Fauna of Amphibians of Vietnam: Distribution, Taxonomic and Ecological Diversity,” supervised by Ilya S. Darevsky.

=== Membership in scientific societies ===
- A. M. Nikolsky Herpetological Society (since 2000; Presidium member since 2015)
- Societas Europaea Herpetologica (European Herpetological Society)

=== Editorial board memberships ===
- Russian Journal of Herpetology
- Current Studies in Herpetology (Russian: Современная герпетология)
- Asian Herpetological Research (AHR)
- RusTerra Magazine

=== Death ===
Orlov died on 25 March 2026, at the age of 73.

== Taxa named in his honour ==
- Rhacophorus orlovi Ziegler & J. Köhler, 2001
- Vipera orlovi Tuniyev & Ostrovskikh, 2001
- Bronchocela orlovi Hallermann, 2004

== Taxa described ==
- Amolops spinapectoralis
- Boiga bengkuluensis
- Boiga tanahjampeana
- Boiga ranawanei
- Calamaria abramovi
- Cyrtodactylus phuocbinhensis
- Cyrtodactylus puhuensis
- Cyrtodactylus taynguyenensis
- Diploderma ngoclinense
- Gekko ulikovskii
- Gloydius angusticeps
- Goniurosaurus bawanglingensis
- Goniurosaurus huuliensis
- Gonydactylus markuscombaii
- Gonydactylus martinstolli
- Goniurosaurus murphyi
- Gracixalus supercornutus
- Hebius leucomystax
- Kurixalus ananjevae
- Kurixalus baliogaster
- Leptobrachium banae
- Leptobrachium ngoclinhense
- Leptobrachium xanthospilum
- Leptolalax nahangensis
- Leptolalax pyrrhops
- Leptolalax sungi
- Leptolalax tuberosus
- Microhyla arboricola
- Microhyla darevskii
- Microhyla minuta
- Microhyla pineticola
- Microhyla pulchella
- Natrix megalocephala
- Ophryophryne elfina
- Opisthotropis daovantieni
- Protobothrops maolanensis
- Protobothrops sieversorum
- Protobothrops trungkhanhensis
- Scincella darevskii
- Scincella devorator
- Scincella rara
- Sphenomorphus cryptotis
- Sphenomorphus tetradactylus
- Sphenomorphus yersini
- Triceratolepidophis
- Tropidophorus boehmei
- Tropidophorus latiscutatus
- Tropidophorus matsuii
- Tropidophorus murphyi
- Rana attigua
- Rana bacboensis
- Rana banaorum
- Rana daorum
- Rana hmongorum
- Rana megatympanum
- Rana morafkai
- Rana trankieni
- Varanus nesterovi
