= Amy Lathrop =

Canadian herpetologist and museum curator

- Born: 1 June 1975 (age 51)
- Known for: Research on reptiles and frogs; vertebrate evolution in Pantepui
- Awards: Distinguished Fellow of the American Society of Ichthyologists and Herpetologists
- Scientific career
- Fields: Biology, herpetology, taxonomy
- Workplaces: Royal Ontario Museum

Amy Lathrop (born 1 June 1975) is a Canadian herpetologist and museum curator. She is a curator at the Centre for Biodiversity and Conservation Biology of the Royal Ontario Museum in Toronto, Canada, where her research focuses on vertebrate evolution in Pantepui.

== Biography ==
Lathrop is a curator at the Royal Ontario Museum's Centre for Biodiversity and Conservation Biology. Her research has focused particularly on the systematics, taxonomy and evolution of reptiles and amphibians, including the herpetofauna of the Pantepui region of the Guiana Shield.

Lathrop has collaborated with researchers from a number of institutions on taxonomic and phylogenetic studies of amphibians and reptiles from South America and Southeast Asia. Her work includes the description of new species of frogs and research on species complexes of Asian geckos and frogs.

== Selected publications ==
- Kok, P. J. R., Nicolaï, M. P. J., Lathrop, A. & MacCulloch, R. D. (2018). "Anomaloglossus meansi sp. n., a new Pantepui species of the Anomaloglossus beebei group (Anura, Aromobatidae)". ZooKeys 759: 99–116. doi:10.3897/zookeys.759.24742.
- Suwannapoom, C., Yuan, Z.-Y., Chen, J.-M., Hou, M., Zhao, H.-P., Wang, L.-J., Nguyen, T. S., Nguyen, T. Q., Murphy, R. W., Sullivan, J., McLeod, D. S. & Che, J. (2016). "Taxonomic revision of the Chinese Limnonectes (Anura, Dicroglossidae) with the description of a new species from China and Myanmar". Zootaxa 4093(2): 181–200. doi:10.11646/zootaxa.4093.2.2.
- Yuan, Z.-Y., Suwannapoom, C., Yan, F., Poyarkov, N. A., Nguyen, S. N., Chen, H.-M., Chomdej, S., Murphy, R. W., Sullivan, J., Che, J. (2016). "Red River barrier and Pleistocene climatic fluctuations shaped the genetic structure of Microhyla fissipes complex (Anura: Microhylidae) in southern China and Indochina". Current Zoology. doi:10.1093/cz/zow042.
- Nguyen, S. N., Le, T. N. T., Tran, T. A. D., Orlov, N. L., Lathrop, A., MacCulloch, R. D., Le, T. D. T., Jin, J. Q., Nguyen, L. T., Nguyen, T. T., Hoang, D. D., Che, J., Murphy, R. W. & Zhang, Y. P. (2013). "Phylogeny of the Cyrtodactylus irregularis species complex (Squamata: Gekkonidae) from Vietnam with the description of two new species". Zootaxa 3737(4): 399–414. doi:10.11646/zootaxa.3737.4.4.
- Kok, P. J. R., MacCulloch, R. D., Lathrop, A., Willaert, B. & Bossuyt, F. (2010). "A new species of Anomaloglossus (Anura: Aromobatidae) from the Pakaraima Mountains of Guyana". Zootaxa 2660: 18–32.
