= Dragonsnake =

Dragonsnake can refer to:

- Xenodermus javanicus, a species of snake in the family Xenodermidae
- a Dragon snake (Star Wars), a fictional creature from the Star Wars franchise
