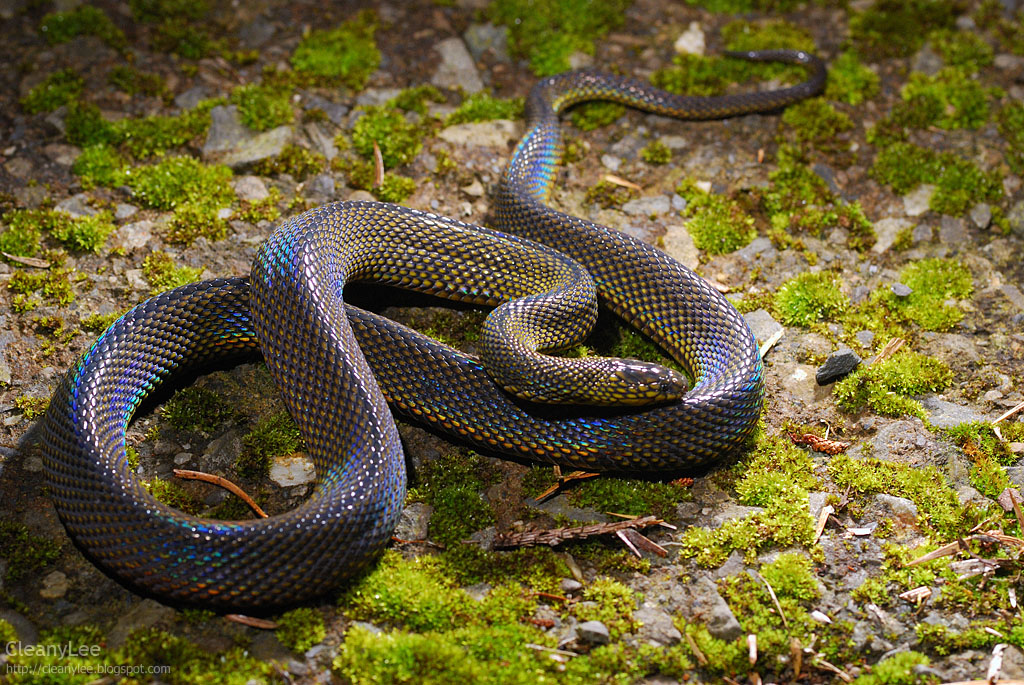
- Achalinus formosanus formosanus

Conservation status
- Least Concern (IUCN 3.1)

Scientific classification
- Kingdom: Animalia
- Phylum: Chordata
- Class: Reptilia
- Order: Squamata
- Suborder: Serpentes
- Family: Xenodermidae
- Genus: Achalinus
- Species: A. formosanus

Binomial name
- Achalinus formosanus Boulenger, 1908
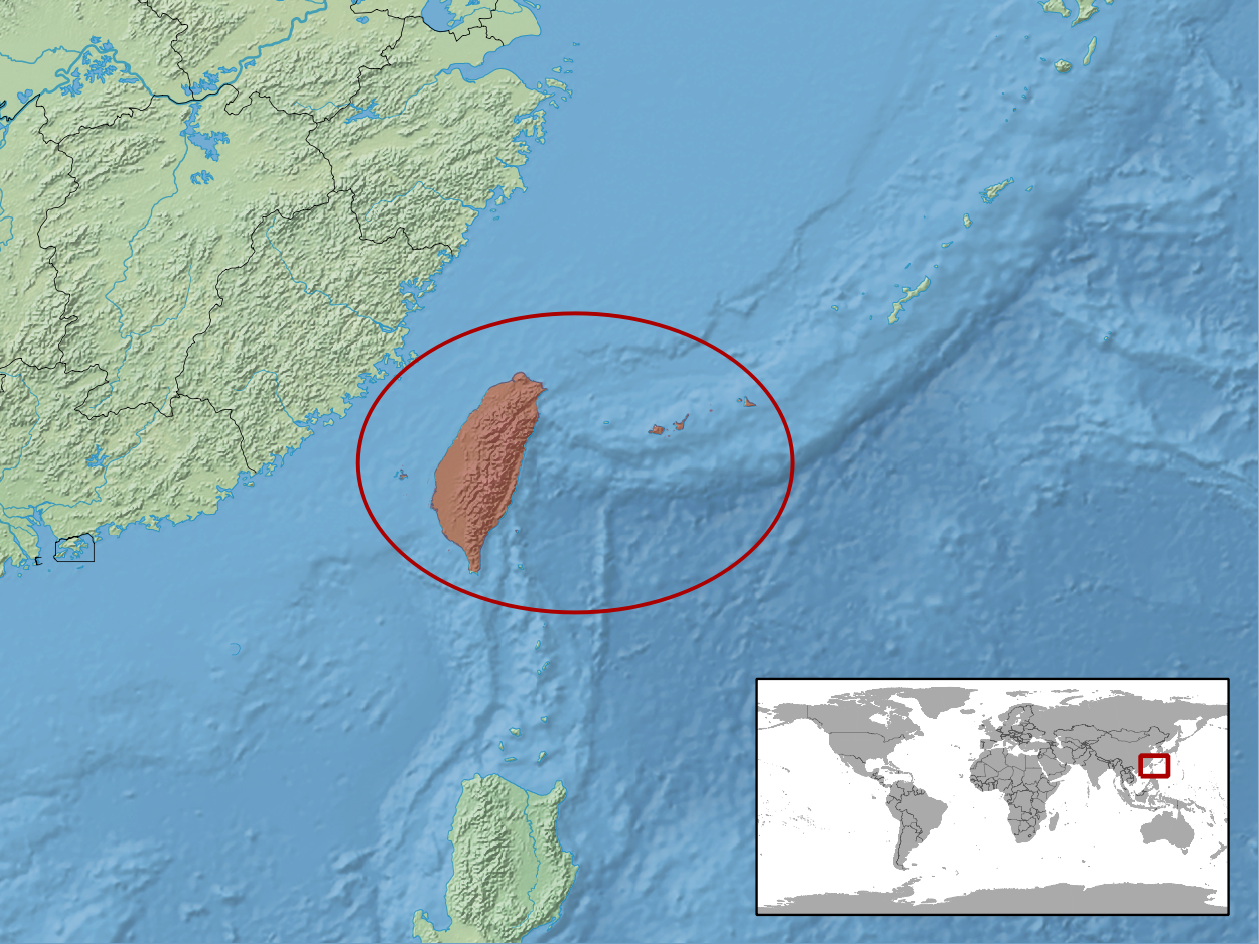

Synonyms
- Achalinopsis sauteri Steindachner, 1913

= Achalinus formosanus =

Species of snake

Achalinus formosanus, common name Formosan odd-scaled snake or Taiwan burrowing snake, is a non-venomous snake in family Xenodermidae that is found in Taiwan and in the southern Ryukyu Islands (Japan).

== Taxonomy ==
There are two subspecies:

- Achalinus formosanus formosanus Boulenger, 1908 — Taiwan
- Achalinus formosanus chigirai Ota and Toyama, 1989 — Ryukyu Islands

Specific name formosanus means "from Formosa", referring to the fact that this species was first described from a specimen from Taiwan. chigirai refers to Yoshinori Chigira, who collected the first specimen of Achalinus formosanus chigirai.

Achalinus formosanus formosanus is ecologically and morphologically similar to the Taiwan endemic Achalinus niger; the two differ in some scale counts and characteristics. A study using genetic markers found these two taxa to be overlapping, warranting further studies on their taxonomy.

== Distribution ==
Achalinus formosanus formosanus is known from central and southern Taiwan at elevations of 1,000–2,000 m (3,300–6,600 ft) asl. Achalinus formosanus chigirai occurs at low altitudes (below 200 m (660 ft)) on the Iriomote-jima and Ishigaki Islands, both belonging to the Yaeyama Group.

== Description ==
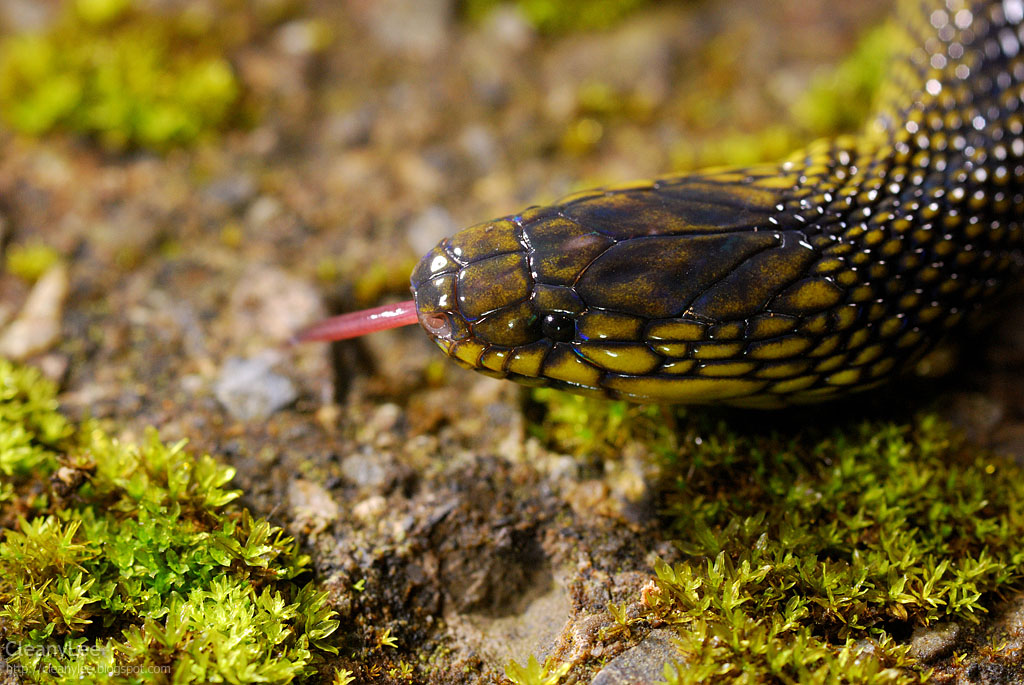

Achalinus formosanus is a small snake growing to a total length of about 90 cm (35 in). The whole body is iridescent under light. Head is small, oval, and without distinct neck. Body is slender and tail is moderately short. Eyes are small, bead-like; iris is black and indistinct. Upper head, body and tail is uniform olive, grayish tan, or black. Mid-dorsal row of scales on body and tail show a dark longitudinal line. Ventral surface is olive-yellow or dark gray. The young are usually black.

== Behaviour ==
Achalinus formosanus has been reported to eat earthworms. It may also prey on slugs and frogs. It is a nocturnal, terrestrial snake that is non-venomous and not aggressive. It is oviparous.

== Habitat and conservation ==
Achalinus formosanus formosanus are found in montane humid forests, where they live in dark, wet micro-habitats such as the forest floor, rotten wood, and leaf litter. Achalinus formosanus chigirai have been collected in on a road at night and in a limestone cave in the daytime as well as in low grass along a path in the evening and on forest floor at night.

No significant threats are known. It is not a protected species in Taiwan, but Achalinus formosanus chigirai is classified as "near threatened" in Japan.
