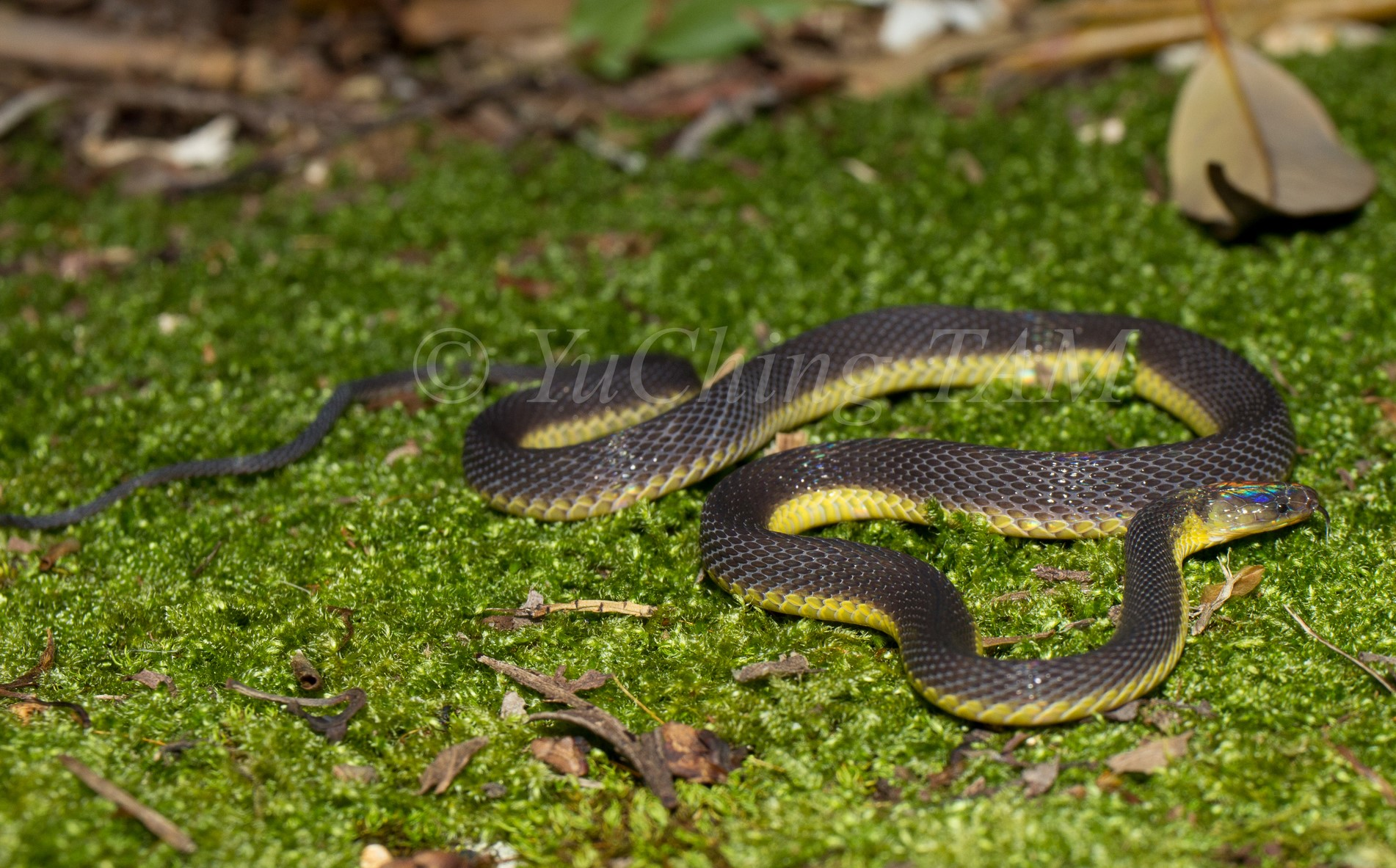

Conservation status
- Near Threatened (IUCN 3.1)

Scientific classification
- Kingdom: Animalia
- Phylum: Chordata
- Class: Reptilia
- Order: Squamata
- Suborder: Serpentes
- Family: Xenodermidae
- Genus: Achalinus
- Species: A. werneri

Binomial name
- Achalinus werneri Van Denburgh, 1912

Synonyms
- Achalinus loochoensis Thompson, 1912

= Achalinus werneri =

Species of snake

Achalinus werneri, also known commonly as the Amami odd-scaled snake and the Amami Takachiho snake, is a species of snake in the family Xenodermatidae. The species is endemic to the Ryukyu Islands, Japan. There are no subspecies that are recognized as being valid.

== Etymology ==
The specific name, werneri, is in honor of Austrian herpetologist Franz Werner.

== Habitat ==
The preferred natural habitats of A. werneri are forest, grassland, and freshwater wetlands.

== Description ==
Dorsally, A. werneri is dark olive; ventrally, it is yellow. It has 88–96 subcaudals.

== Diet ==
A. werneri preys upon earthworms.

== Reproduction ==
A. werneri is oviparous. Clutch size is three to eight eggs.

== Conservation status ==
In 1996 the species Achalinus werneri was classified as Near Threatened by the IUCN. This is because its range is estimated to be less than 20,000 km^{2} (7,722 sq mi), or its area of occupancy is estimated to be less than 2,000 km^{2} (772 sq mi), and estimates indicate its range is severely fragmented, or known to exist at no more than ten locations, and that a continuing decline has been inferred, observed or projected in the area, extent and/or quality of its habitat.
