= Achalinus zugorum =

Scientific classification
- Kingdom: Animalia
- Phylum: Chordata
- Class: Reptilia
- Order: Squamata
- Suborder: Serpentes
- Family: Xenodermidae
- Genus: Achalinus
- Species: A. zugorum

Binomial name
- Achalinus zugorum Miller, Davis, Luong, Do, Pham, Ziegler, Lee, de Queiroz, Reynolds & Nguyen, 2020

Species of snake

Achalinus zugorum is a species of snake in the family Xenodermidae. The species, which was described in 2020 from Ha Giang Province, Vietnam, was discovered by Aryeh H. Miller. It is dark in color or iridescent, with scales morphing from blues to greens. It is named for George R. and Patricia B. Zug. Accordingly, the common name Zugs' odd-scaled snake has been coined for this species.

The holotype, an adult male, measures 353 mm (13.9 in) in snout-to-vent length (SVL) and 458 mm (18.0 in) in total length (including tail). A. zugorum is characterized by its odd non-overlapping scale pattern that differentiates its genus from all other snakes. It can be distinguished by the formation of its elliptical-looking dorsal scales, and the absence of everted labial scales.
