= Achalinus hainanus =

Conservation status
- Vulnerable (IUCN 3.1)

Scientific classification
- Kingdom: Animalia
- Phylum: Chordata
- Class: Reptilia
- Order: Squamata
- Suborder: Serpentes
- Family: Xenodermidae
- Genus: Achalinus
- Species: A. hainanus

Binomial name
- Achalinus hainanus Huang in Hu, Zhao & Huang, 1975

Species of snake

Achalinus hainanus, also known as the Hainan odd-scaled snake, is a species of snake in the family Xenodermatidae. It is endemic to the island of Hainan in China.
