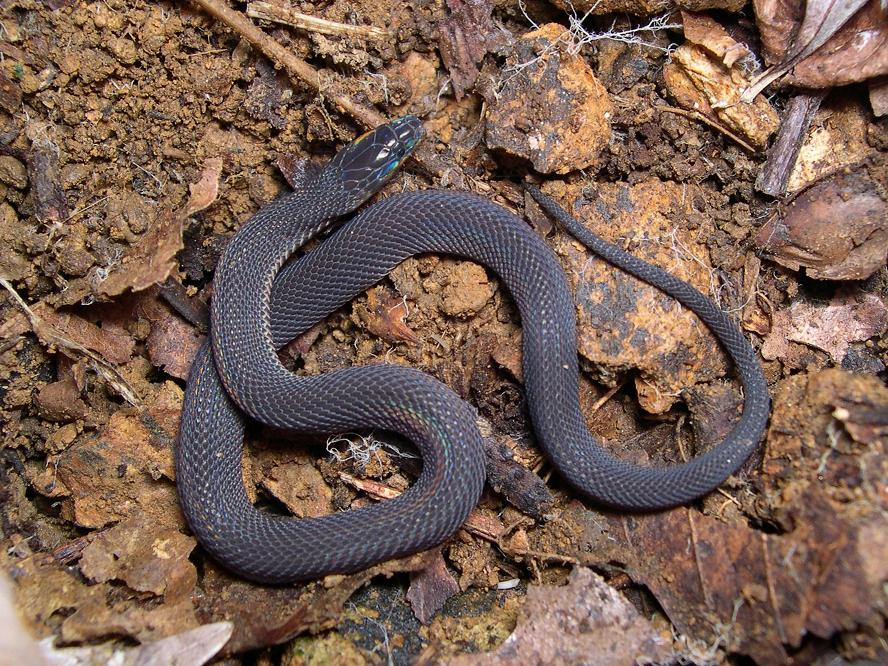

Conservation status
- Least Concern (IUCN 3.1)

Scientific classification
- Kingdom: Animalia
- Phylum: Chordata
- Class: Reptilia
- Order: Squamata
- Suborder: Serpentes
- Family: Xenodermidae
- Genus: Achalinus
- Species: A. spinalis

Binomial name
- Achalinus spinalis Peters, 1869
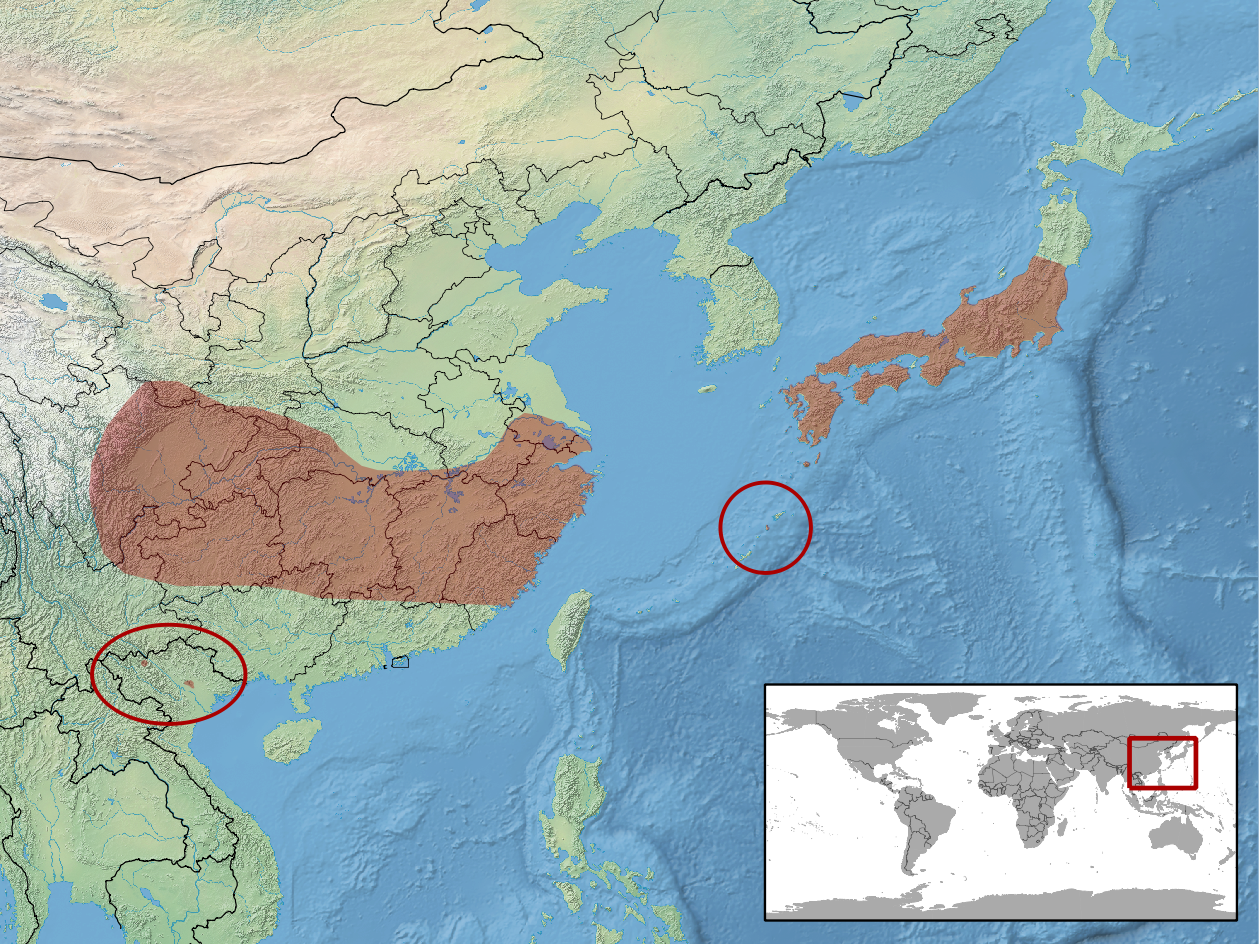

Synonyms
- Ophielaps braconnieri Sauvage, 1877; Achalinus braconnieri (Sauvage, 1877); Achalinus spinalis weigoldi Mell, 1931

= Achalinus spinalis =

Species of snake

Achalinus spinalis, commonly known as Peters' odd-scaled snake, the Japanese odd-scaled snake, the Japanese ground snake or the grey burrowing snake, is a species of snake in the family Xenodermidae.

The species is found in northern Vietnam, Japan (Kyūshū, Honshū, the Ryukyu Islands, Koshiki, Tokuno-shima: Kametoku and Inokawa), and central China (east to Fujian, west to Yunnan and Sichuan, and north to Gansu and Shaanxi, and in Zhejiang, Jiangxi, Jiangsu and Hubei) at an elevation of 1,230 m.
