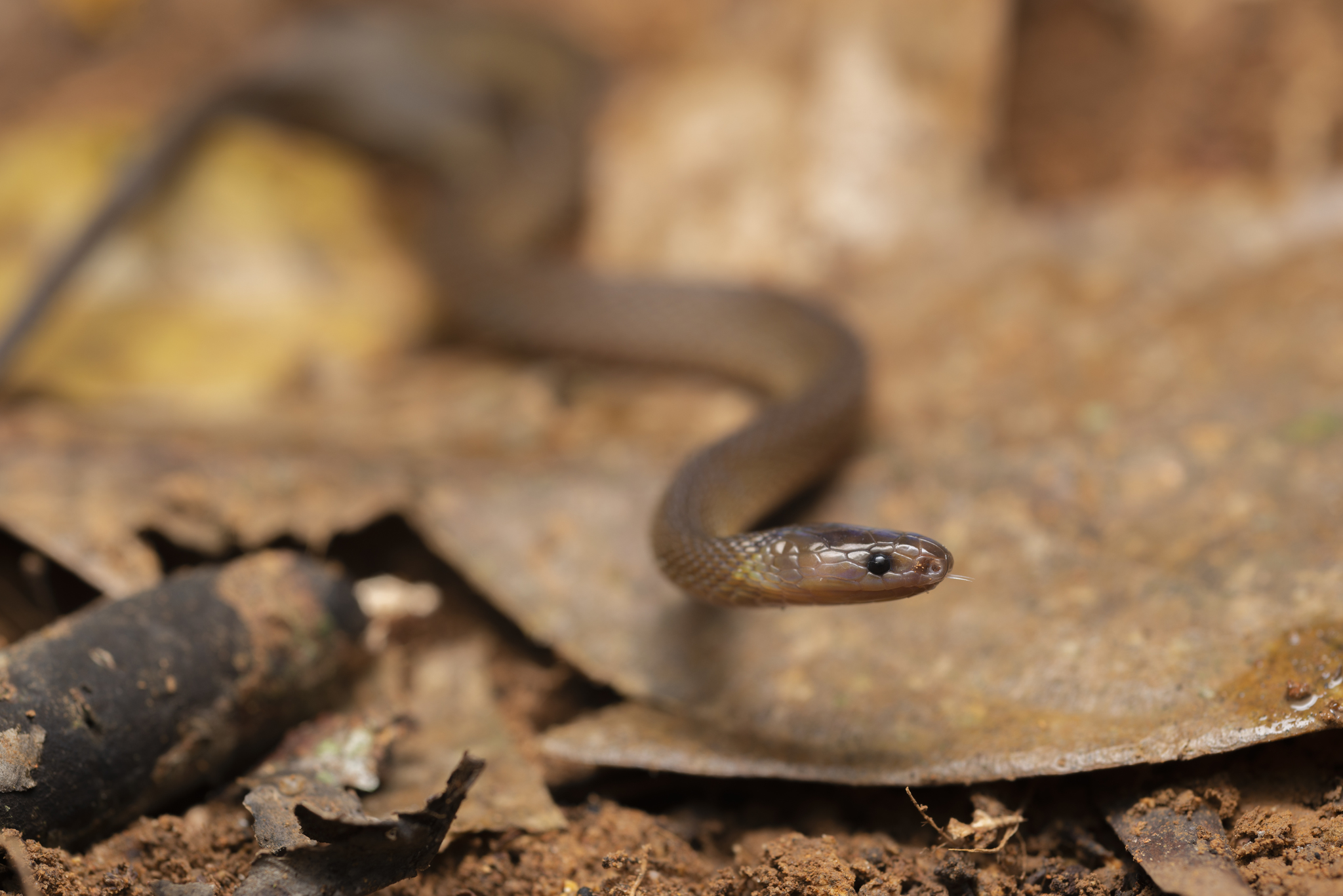

Conservation status
- Least Concern (IUCN 3.1)

Scientific classification
- Kingdom: Animalia
- Phylum: Chordata
- Class: Reptilia
- Order: Squamata
- Suborder: Serpentes
- Family: Xenodermidae
- Genus: Achalinus
- Species: A. rufescens

Binomial name
- Achalinus rufescens Boulenger, 1888
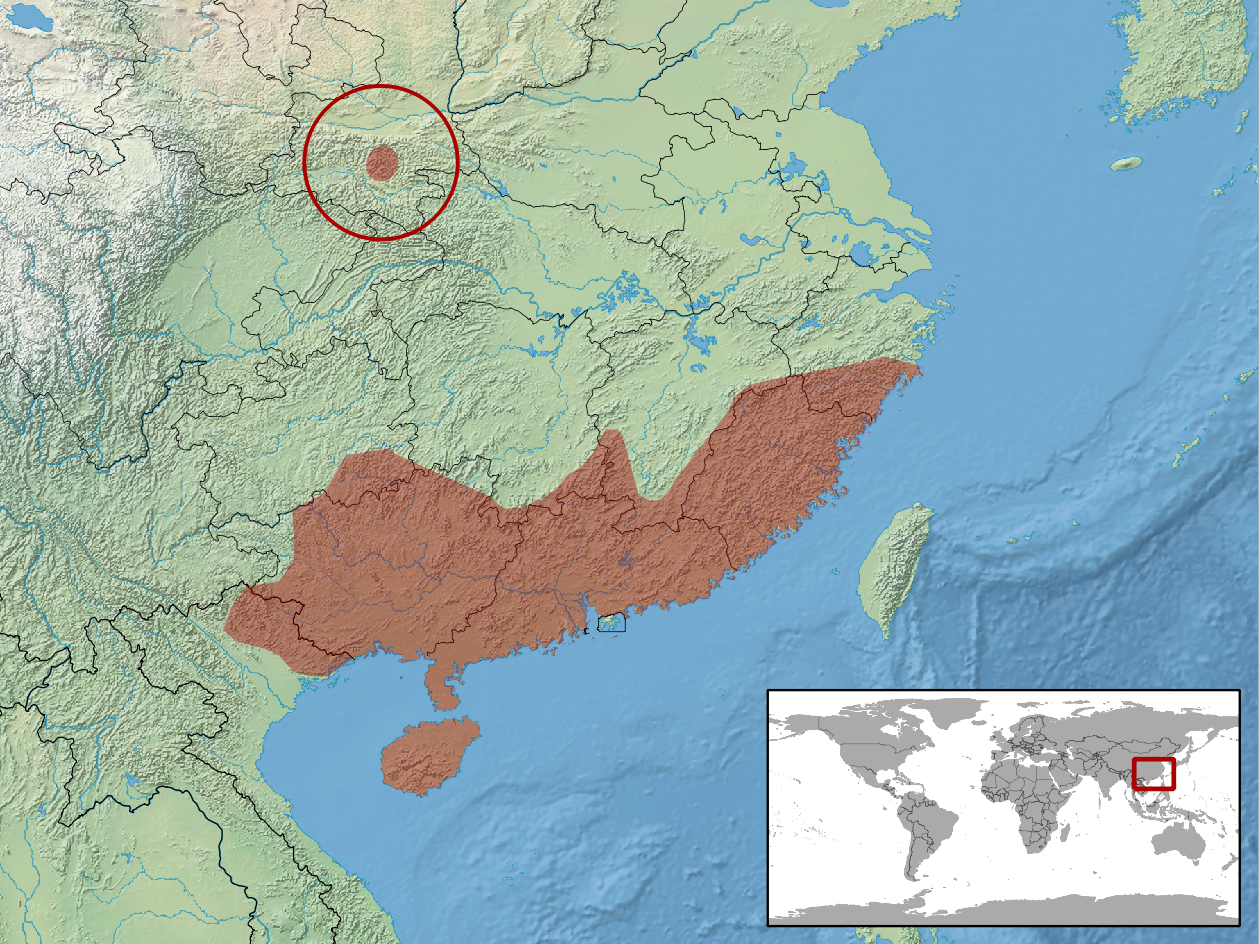

Synonyms
- Achalinus meridianus Smith, 1923; Stoliczkaia kwangsiensis Fan, 1931

= Achalinus rufescens =

Species of snake

Achalinus rufescens, also known as rufous burrowing snake and Boulenger's odd-scaled snake, is a species of snake in the family Xenodermatidae.

The species is found in Northern Vietnam and southern and southeastern China, including Hong Kong and Hainan, as far east as Zhejiang.
