= Achalinus meiguensis =

Conservation status
- Least Concern (IUCN 3.1)

Scientific classification
- Kingdom: Animalia
- Phylum: Chordata
- Class: Reptilia
- Order: Squamata
- Suborder: Serpentes
- Family: Xenodermidae
- Genus: Achalinus
- Species: A. meiguensis

Binomial name
- Achalinus meiguensis Hu & Zhao, 1966
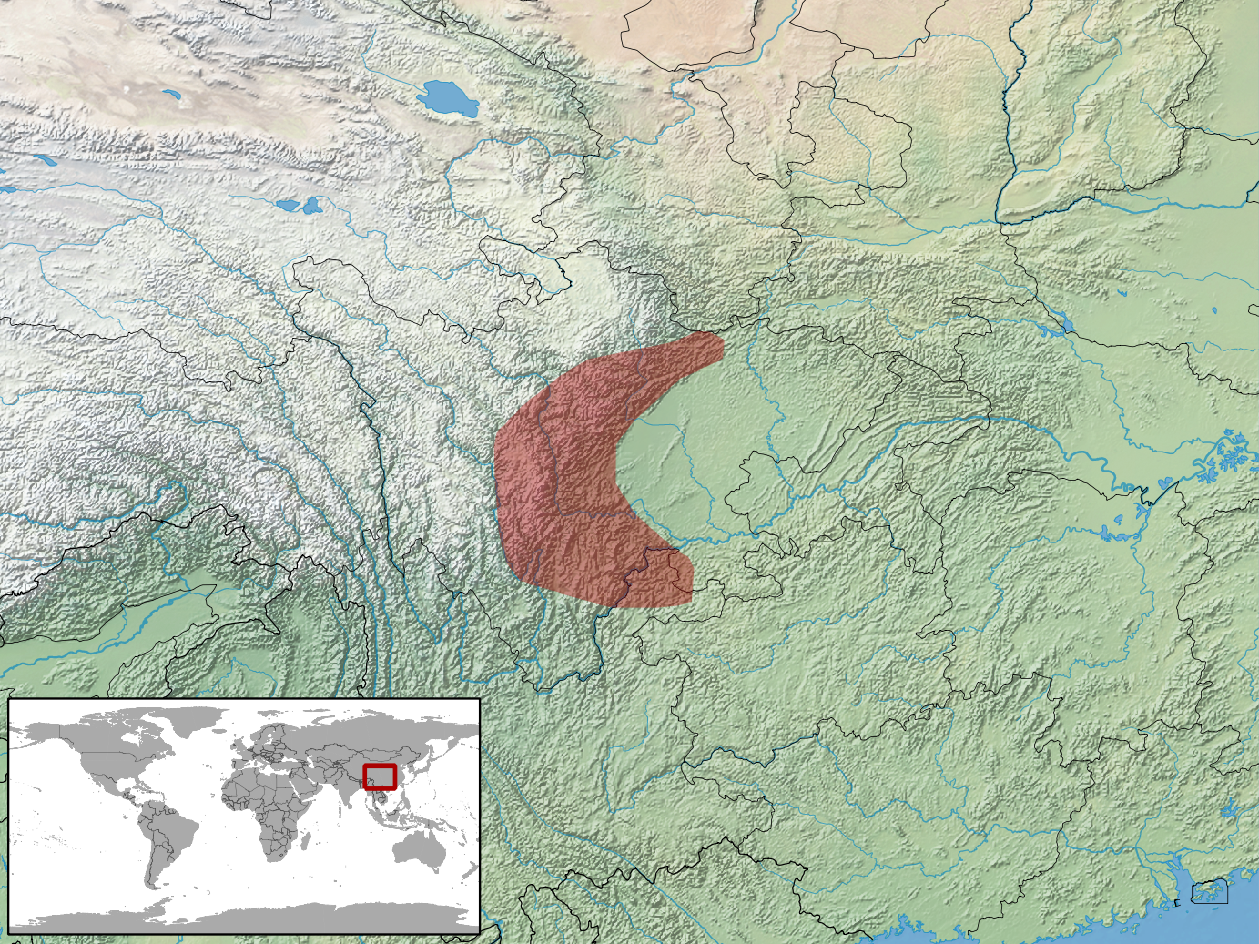

Species of snake

Achalinus meiguensis, commonly known as the Sichuan odd-scaled snake or Szechwan odd-scaled snake, is a species of snake in the family Xenodermatidae. The species is endemic to China and occurs in western Sichuan and Yunnan at elevations of 1200–1400 m.
