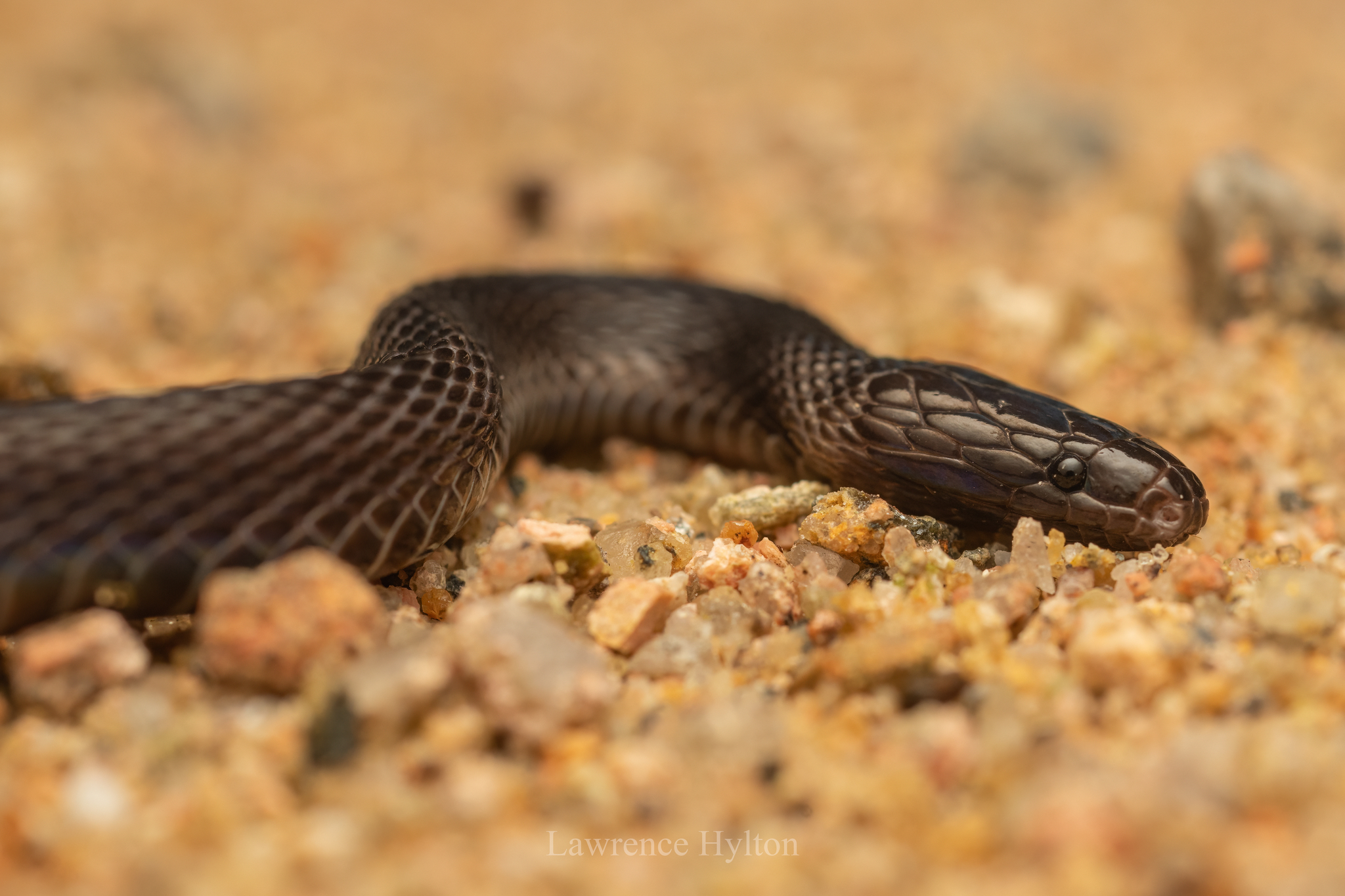

Conservation status
- Least Concern (IUCN 3.1)

Scientific classification
- Kingdom: Animalia
- Phylum: Chordata
- Class: Reptilia
- Order: Squamata
- Suborder: Serpentes
- Family: Xenodermidae
- Genus: Achalinus
- Species: A. jinggangensis

Binomial name
- Achalinus jinggangensis (Zong & Ma, 1983)
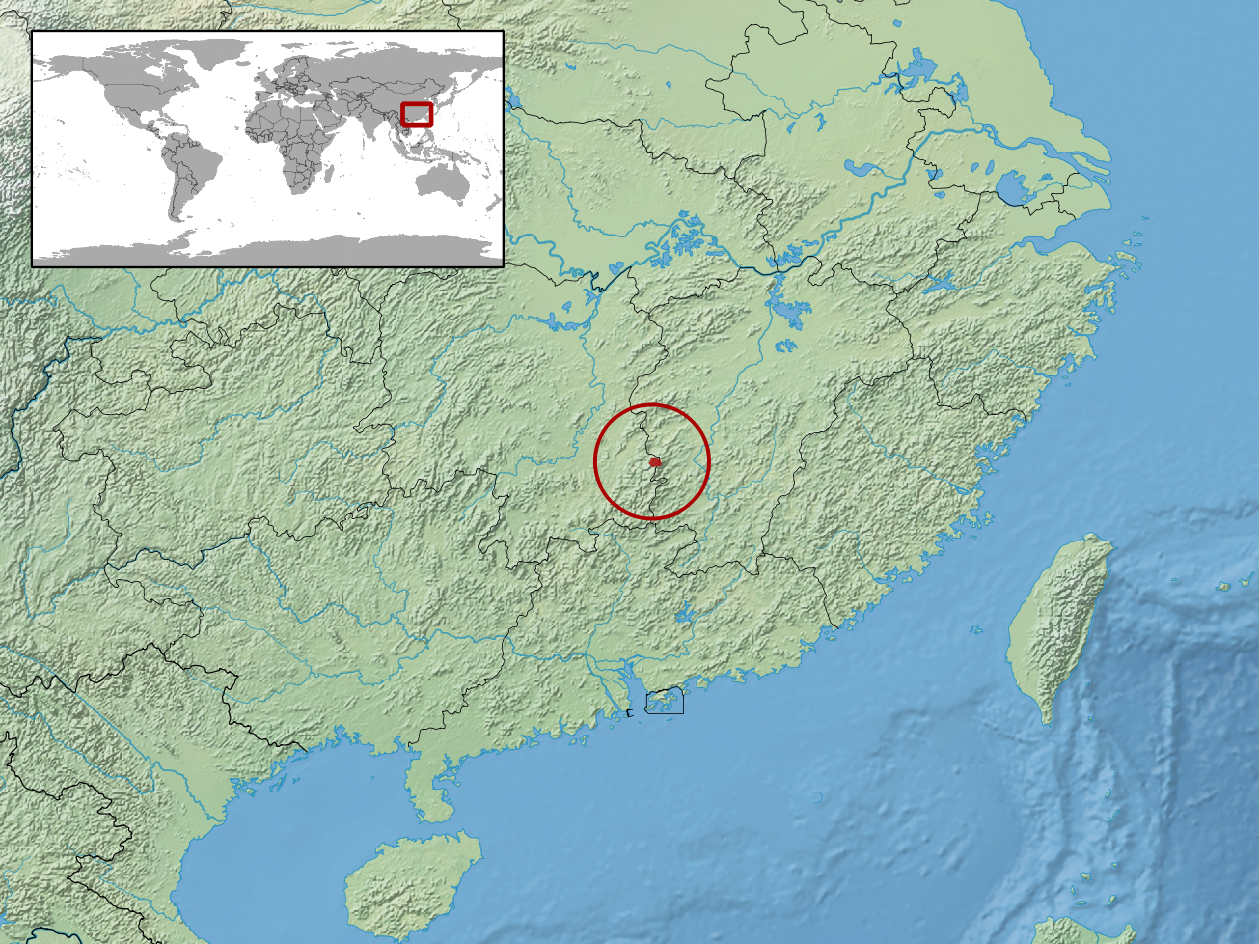
- Geographic distribution of Achalinus jinggangensis

Synonyms
- Achalinopsis jinggangensis Zong & Ma, 1983; Achalinus jinggangensis Ota & Toyama, 1989

= Achalinus jinggangensis =

Species of snake

Achalinus jinggangensis, commonly known as Zong's odd-scaled snake, is a species of snake in the family Xenodermatidae. The species is endemic to the Jinggang Mountains in Jiangxi Province, China.

== Habitat ==
Achalinus jinggangensis is a terrestrial snake that is known from forest habitats at an altitude of between 560 and 1,080 m (1,840 and 3,540 ft). The estimated extent of occurrence is less than 20,000 km^{2} (7,700 sq mi).

== Description ==
Achalinus jinggangensis may attain a total length (including tail) of 46 cm (18 in). It is shiny blue-black both dorsally and ventrally.

== Reproduction ==
Achalinus jinggangensis is oviparous.
