= Stoliczkia khasiensis =

Conservation status
- Data Deficient (IUCN 3.1)

Scientific classification
- Kingdom: Animalia
- Phylum: Chordata
- Class: Reptilia
- Order: Squamata
- Suborder: Serpentes
- Family: Xenodermidae
- Genus: Stoliczkia
- Species: S. khasiensis

Binomial name
- Stoliczkia khasiensis Jerdon, 1870

Synonyms
- Stoliczkaia khasiensis Jerdon, 1870 (misspelling)

Species of snake

Stoliczkia khasiensis (common names: Khasi earth snake, Khase red snake) is a species of snake in the family Xenodermidae. It is endemic to Meghalaya (until 1972 part of Assam), Northeast India. The type locality is Khasi Hills.

Stoliczkia khasiensis inhabit mid hills to submontane forest near mountain streams, at elevations of 700–1,800 m (2,300–5,900 ft) above sea level. While it is only known from few specimens (18, as of 2011), it is considered locally abundant in Sarawak. It occurs in several protected areas (e.g., Crocker Range National Park, Bukit Baka Bukit Raya National Park), and there are no major threats to this species.
