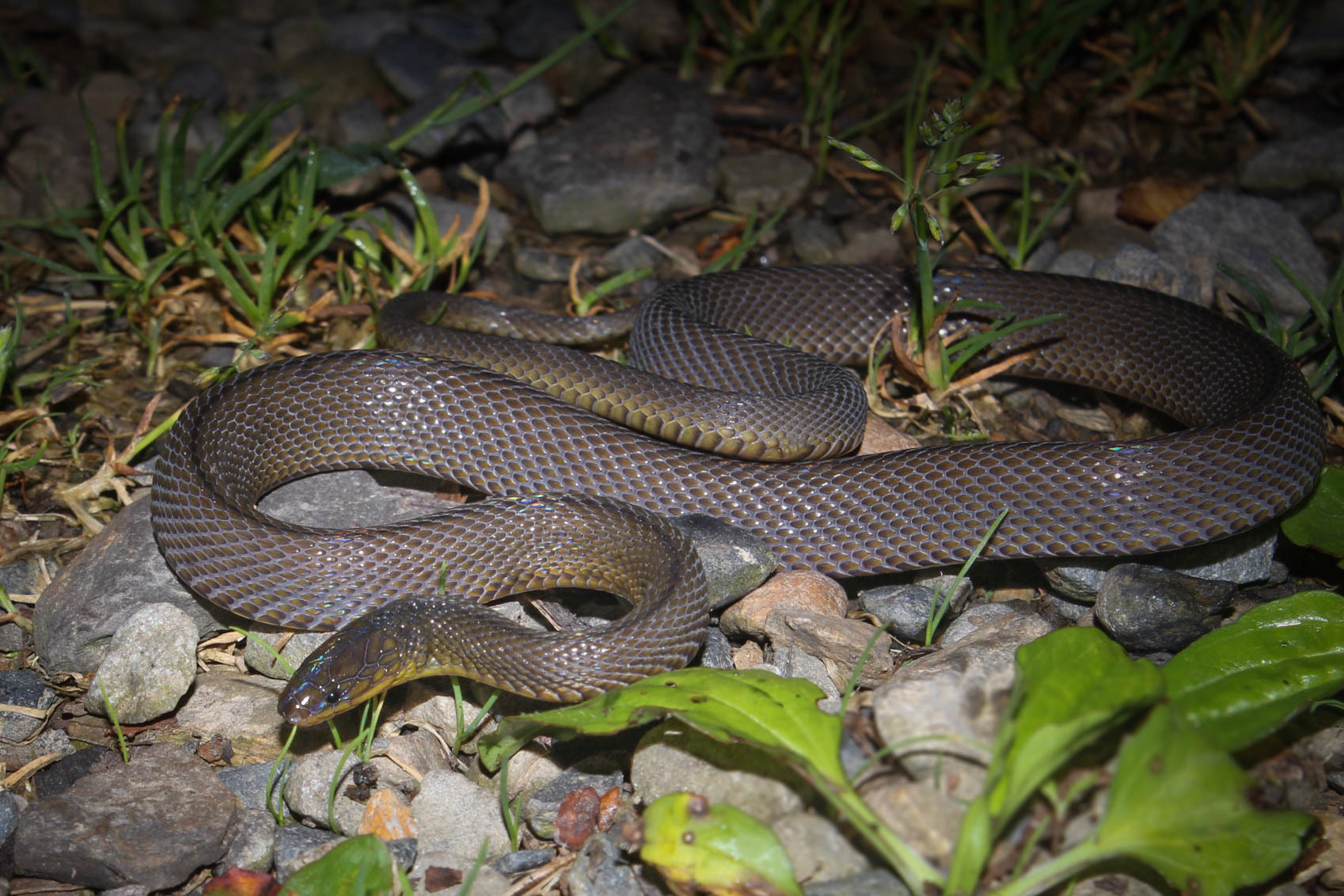

Conservation status
- Least Concern (IUCN 3.1)

Scientific classification
- Kingdom: Animalia
- Phylum: Chordata
- Class: Reptilia
- Order: Squamata
- Suborder: Serpentes
- Family: Xenodermidae
- Genus: Achalinus
- Species: A. niger

Binomial name
- Achalinus niger Maki, 1931
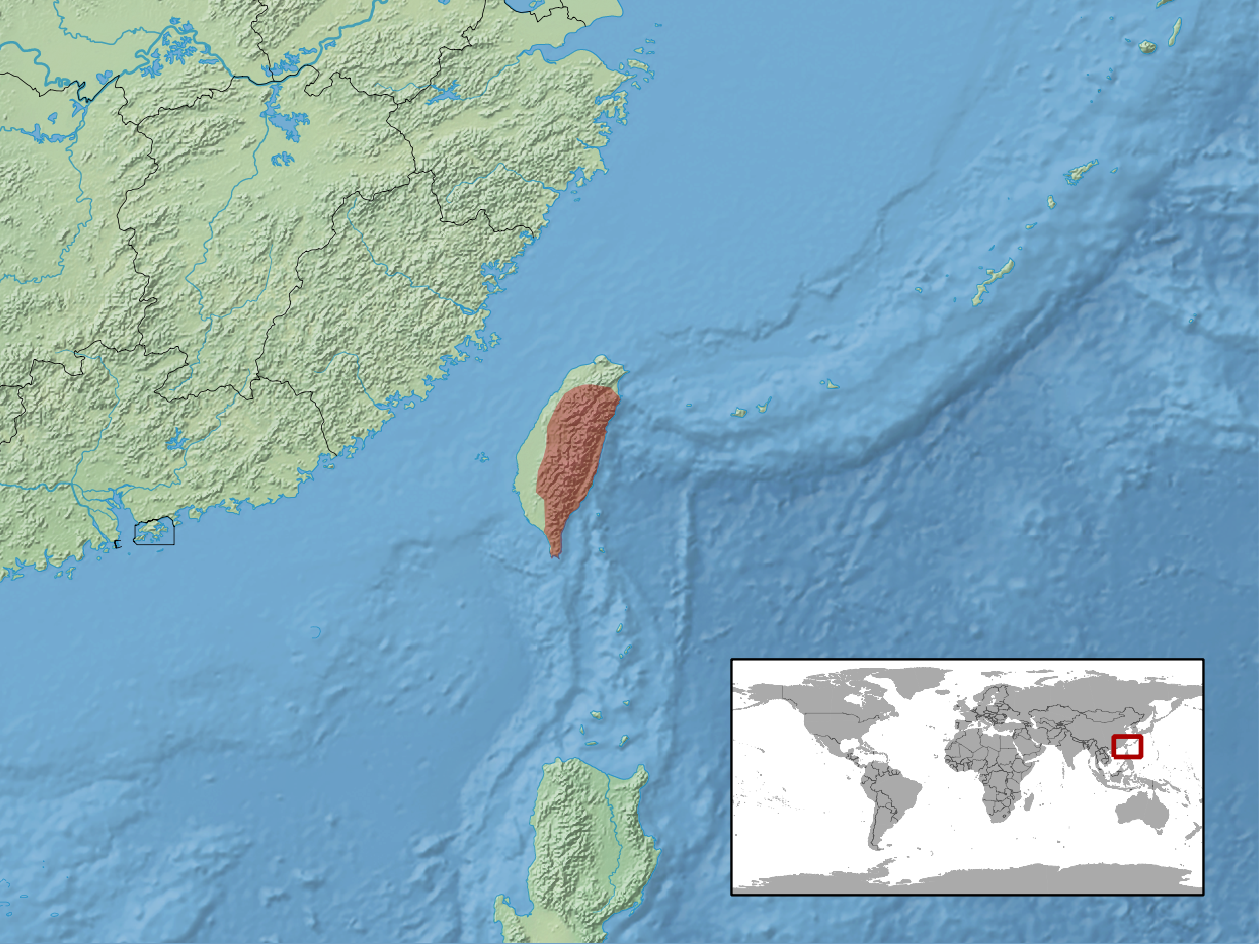

= Achalinus niger =

Species of snake

Achalinus niger, common name black odd-scaled snake or black burrowing snake, is a snake in family Xenodermatidae that is endemic to Taiwan.

== Distribution and phylogeography ==
This Taiwan endemic is widespread at elevations of 1,000–3,000 m (3,300–9,800 ft) asl. Genetic analyses have indicated three distinct clades, a northern one from the Xueshan Range, a southern one from the Alishan Range and southern Central Mountain Range, and Meifeng, a small but very distinct location at the middle of the Central Mountain Range.

== Description ==
Achalinus niger is a small snake growing to a total length of about 80 cm (31 in). The whole body is iridescent under light. Head is small, oval, and without distinct neck. Body is slender and tail is moderately short. Eyes are small, bead-like; iris is black and indistinct. Upper head, body and tail is uniform olive, grayish tan, or black. Mid-dorsal row of scales on body and tail show a dark longitudinal line. Ventral surface is olive-yellow or dark gray. The young are usually black.

== Behaviour ==
It is a nocturnal and terrestrial snake that preys on earthworms, slugs, and frogs. It is non-venomous and not aggressive. Female lays about seven eggs weighing about 1.6 g (0.056 oz) each.

== Habitat and conservation ==
Achalinus niger occurs in forests, and sometimes, in caves. It is often found in dark and wet microhabitats such in leaf litter or rotten logs.

No significant threats are known. It is a Class II protected species.
