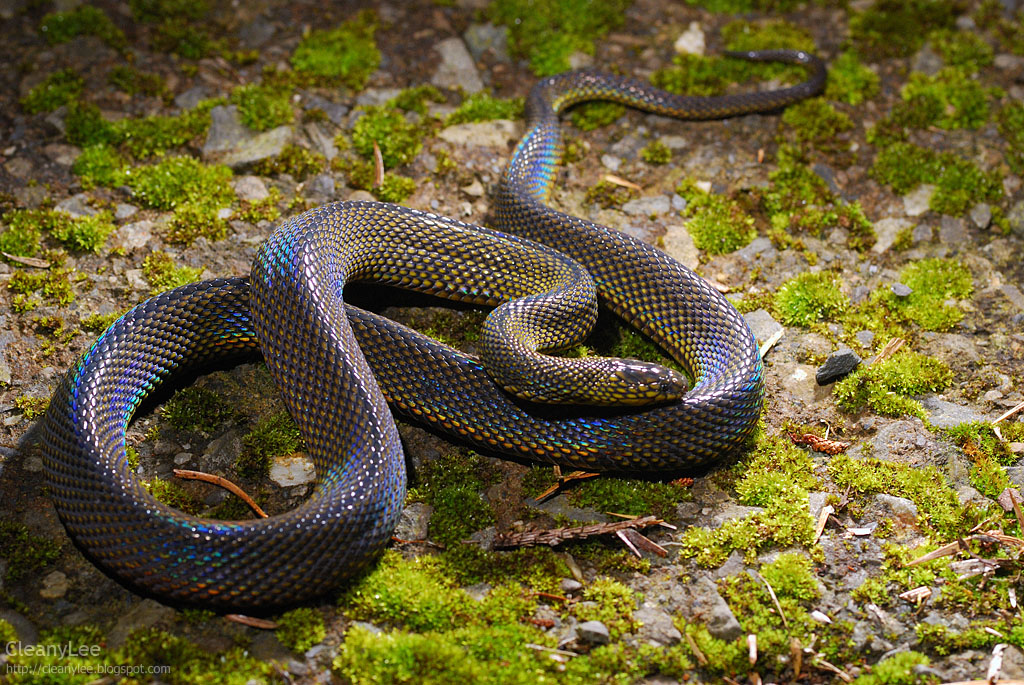
- Formosa odd-scaled snake, Achalinus f. formosanus

Scientific classification
- Kingdom: Animalia
- Phylum: Chordata
- Class: Reptilia
- Order: Squamata
- Suborder: Serpentes
- Family: Xenodermidae
- Genus: Achalinus; W. Peters, 1869

= Achalinus =

Genus of snakes

Achalinus (common name: odd-scaled snakes) is a genus of harmless snakes in the family Xenodermidae. Species of the genus are found in China, Japan, Taiwan, and northern Vietnam. Ten species are recognized as being valid. Achalinus was previously placed in Colubridae (along with other xenodermids). The nickname "odd-scaled" is because their dorsal scales do not overlap one another as in most snakes, but instead are spread out and lie individually similar to pieces of a puzzle. Odd-scaled snakes are burrowers that crawl below the fallen leaves of the forest.

== Species ==
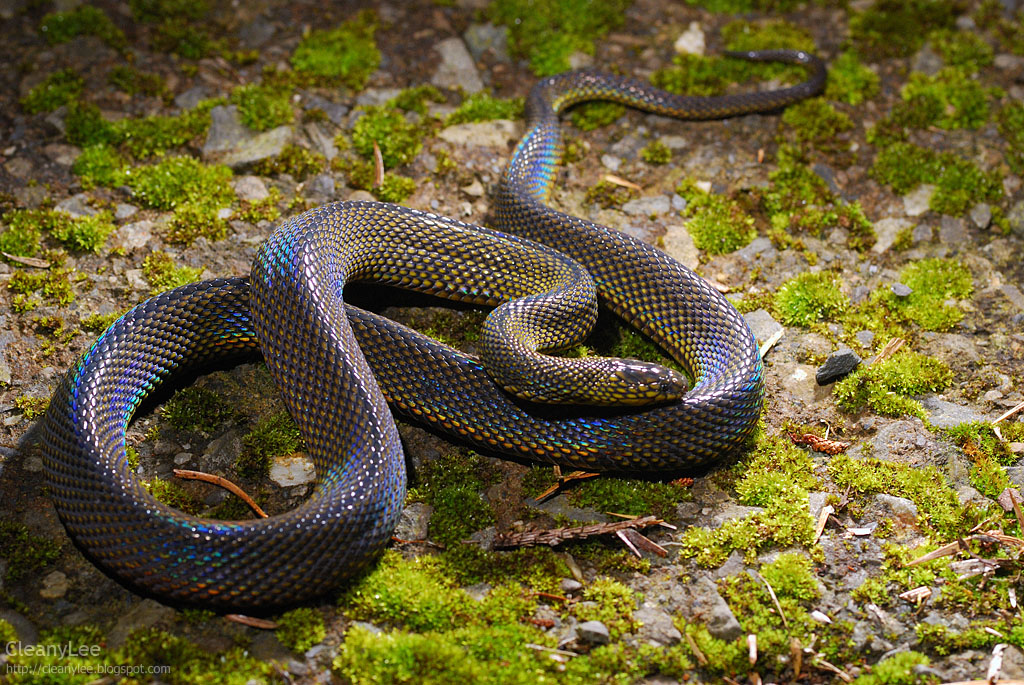
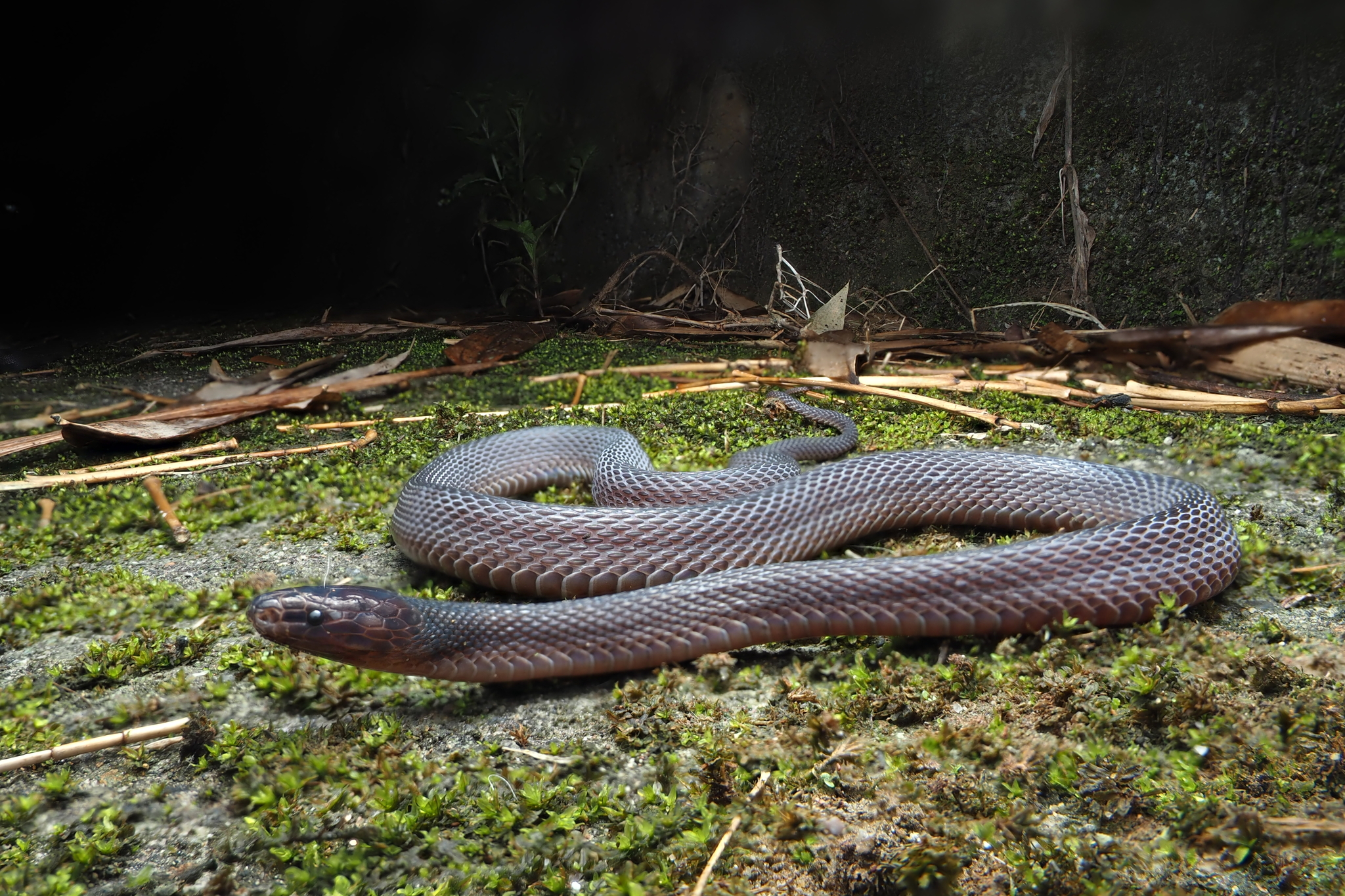
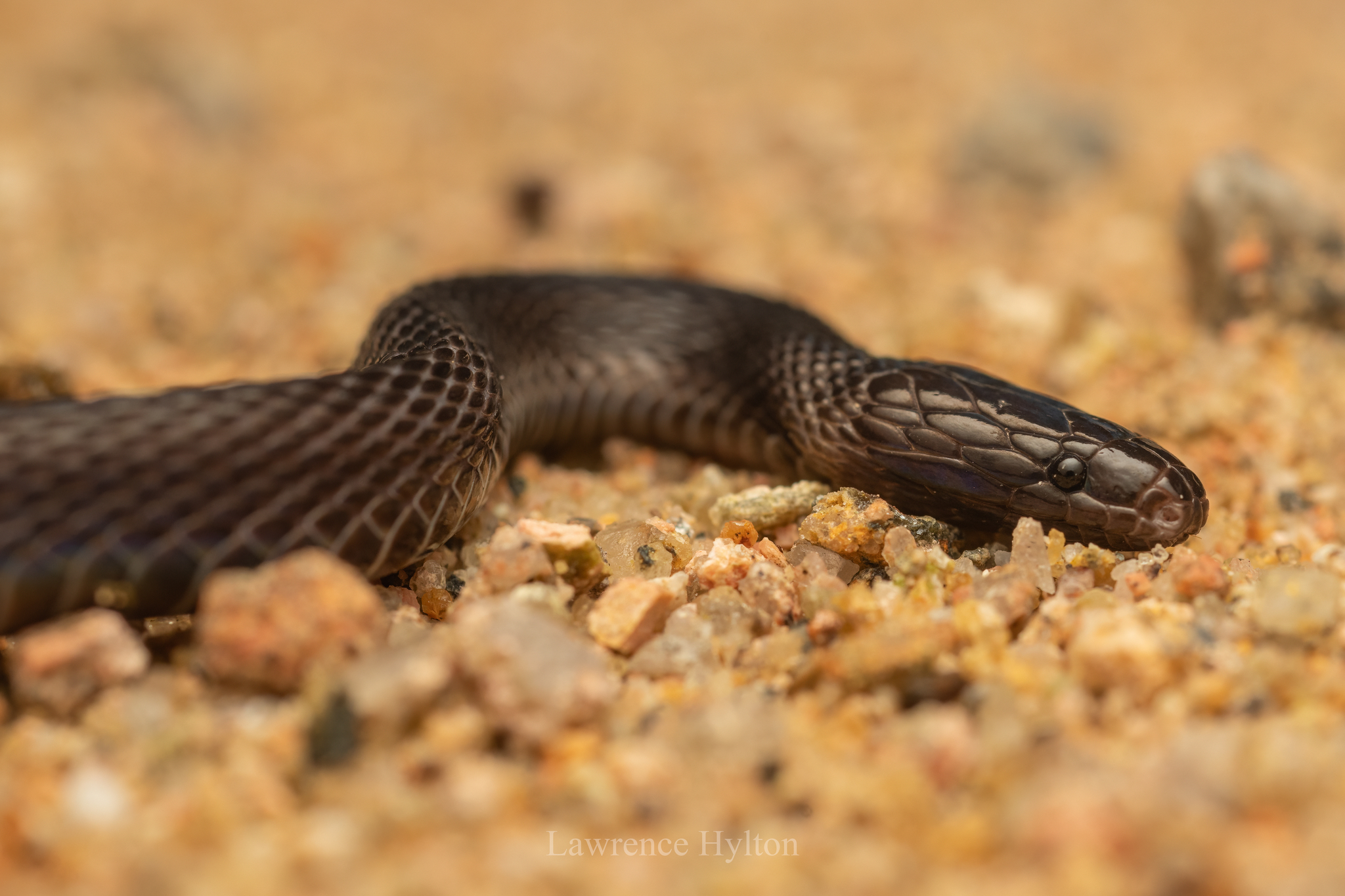
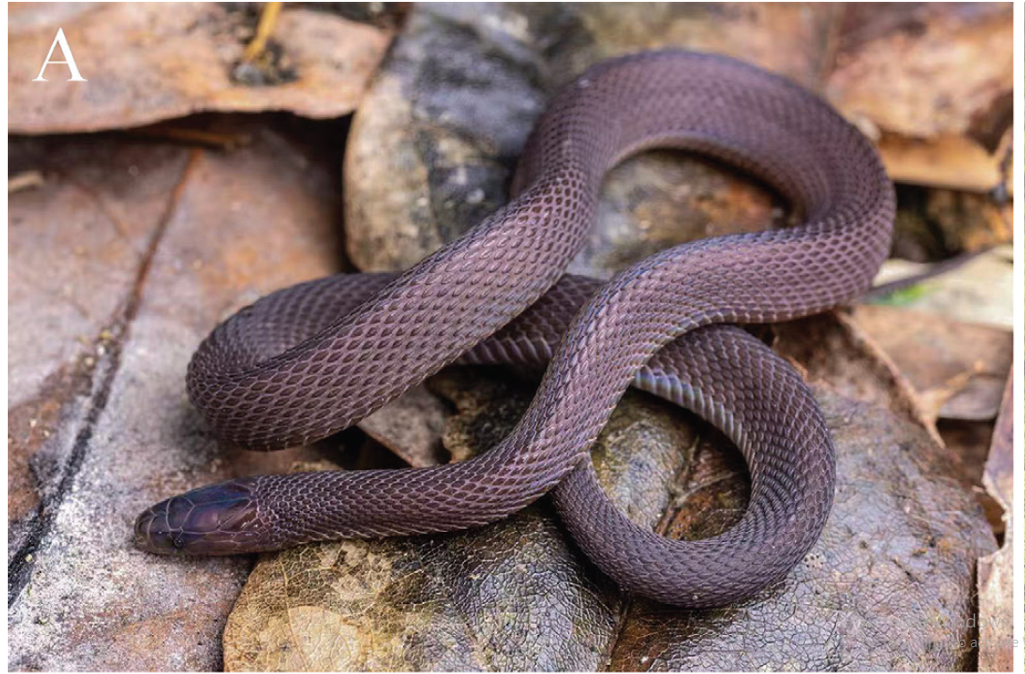
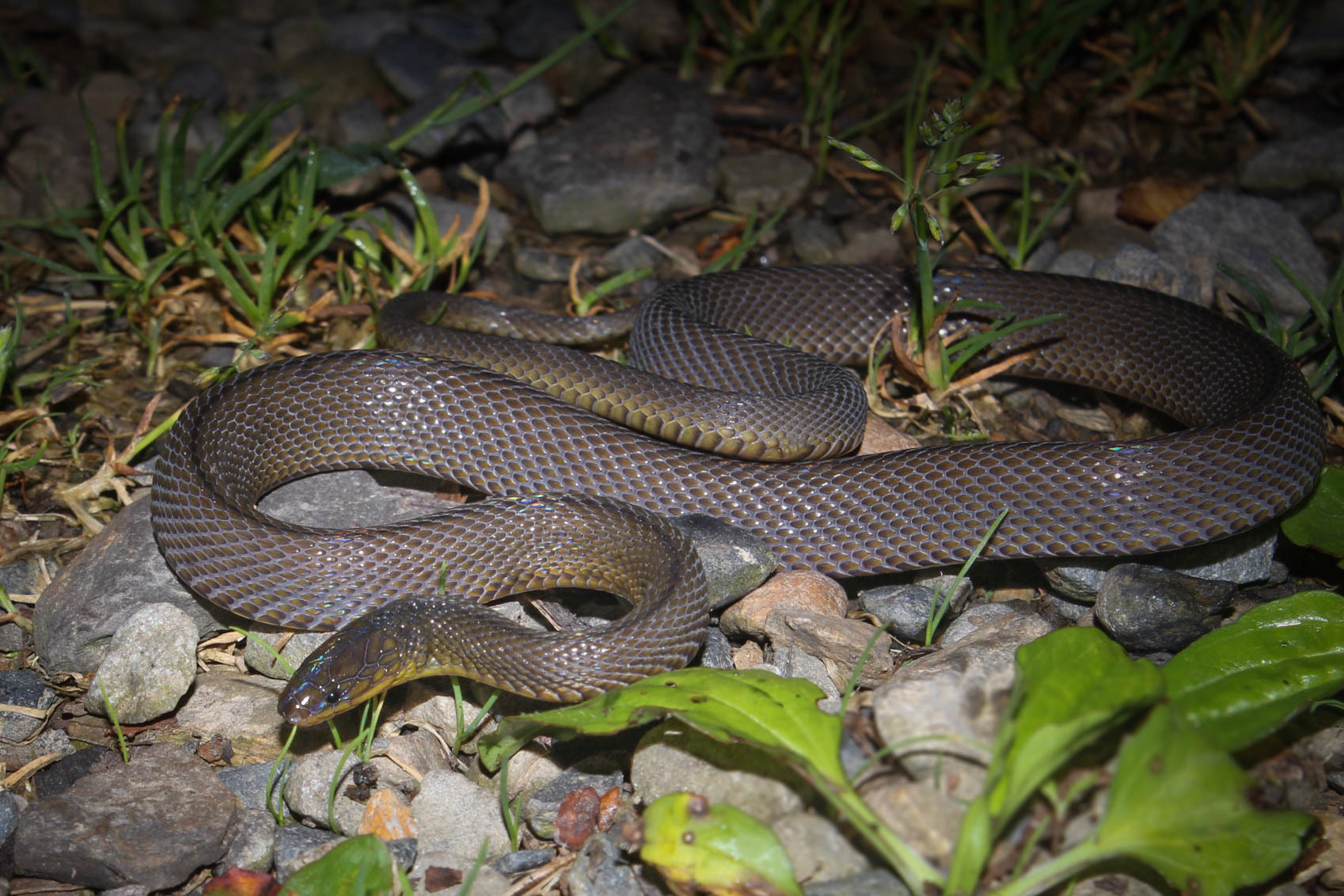
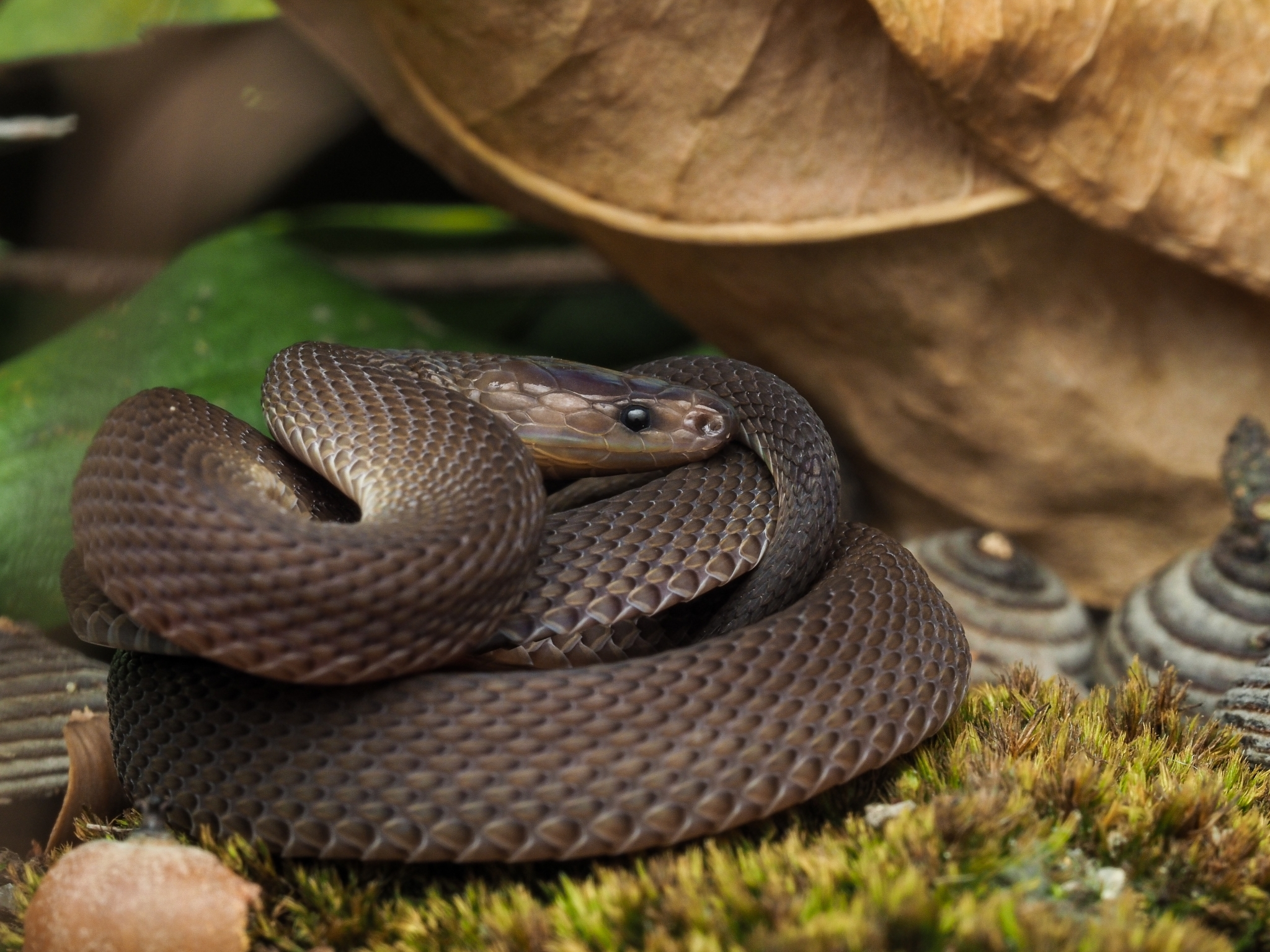
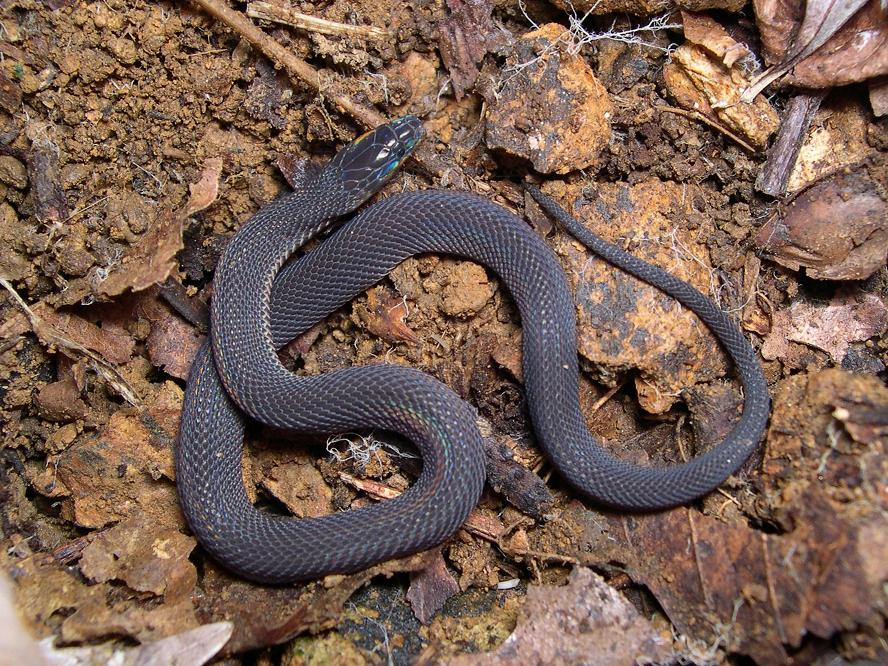
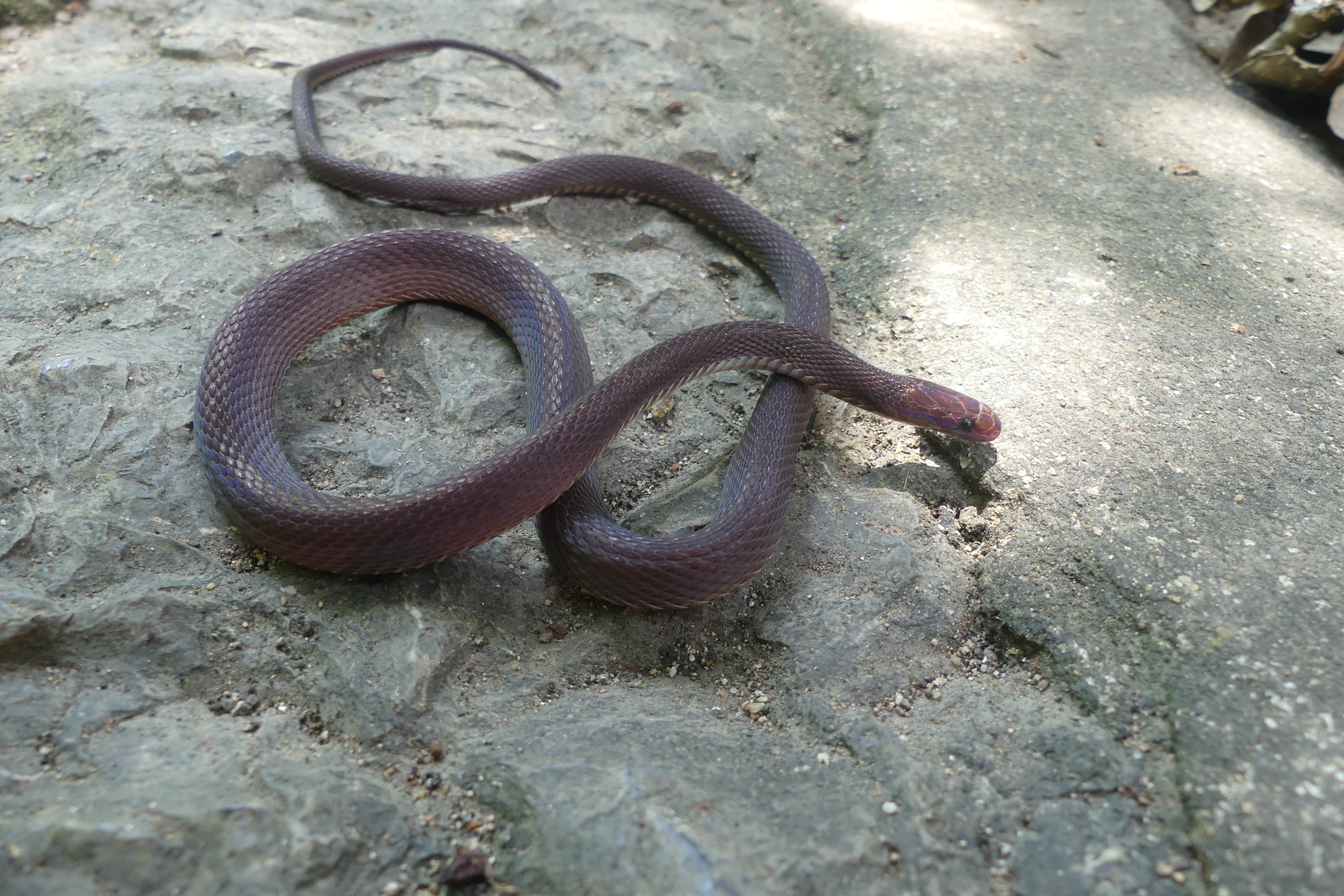
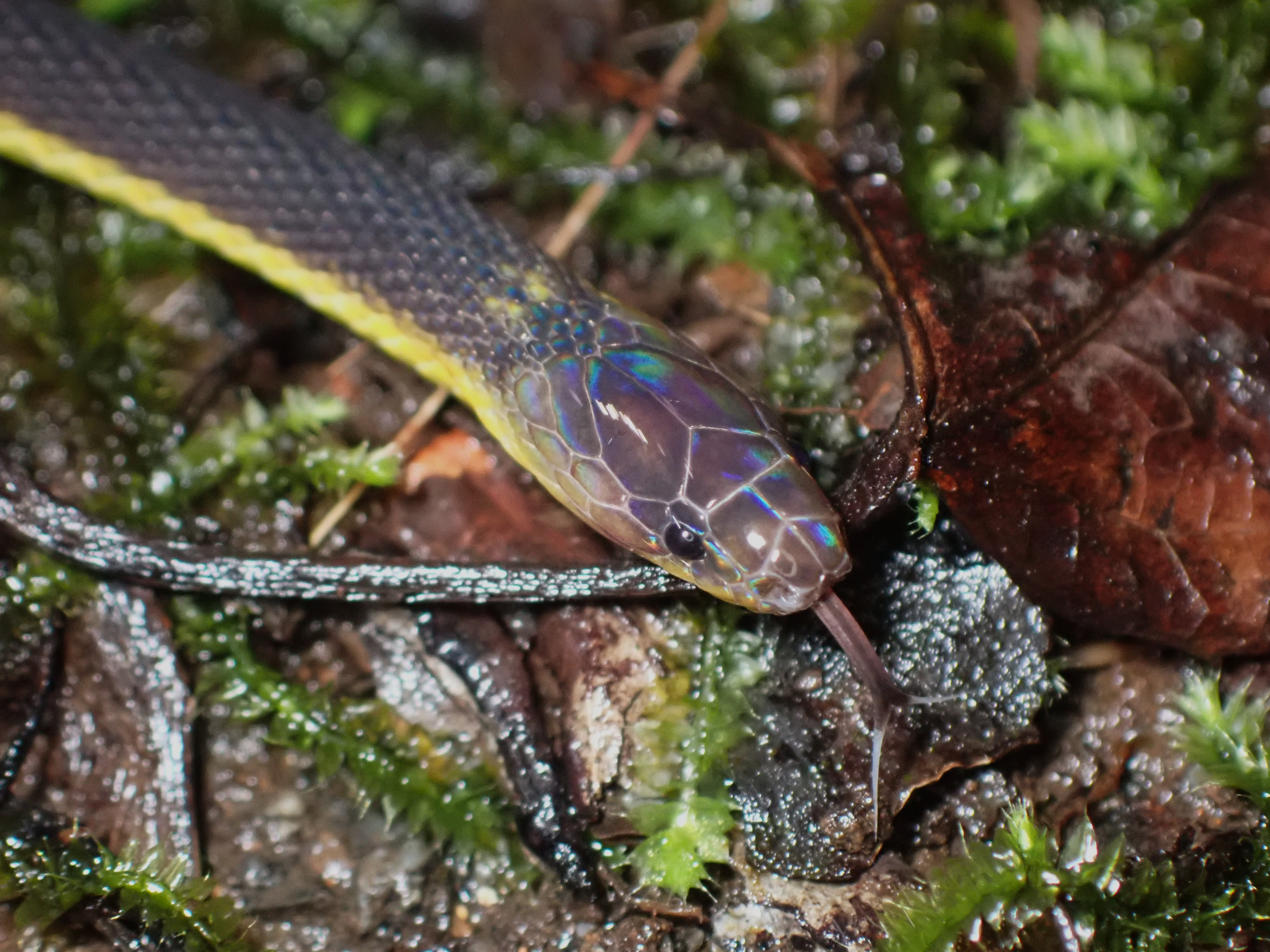
Image	Species	Taxon author	Subsp.*	Common name	Geographic range
	A. ater	Bourret, 1937	0	Bourret's odd-scaled snake	Northern Vietnam and China in Guizhou and Guangxi
	A. dabieshanensis	C. Zhang, Liu, R. Huang & B. Zhang, 2023	0	Dabie Mountains odd-scaled snake	China
	A. damingensis	Y. Xu, Yang, J. Wu, Gong, R. Huang & S. Huang, 2023	0		China (Guangxi)
	A. dehuaensis	K. Li, Y. Wu, R. Xu, Zhu, Ren, Guo & Dong, 2021	0	Dehua odd-scaled snake	China
	A. emilyae	Ziegler, T.Q. Nguyen, C. Pham, T.Th. Nguyen, A. Pham, van Schingen, Th.Th. Nguyen & Le, 2019	0	Emily's burrowing snake	Vietnam
	A. formosanus	Boulenger, 1908	1	Formosa odd-scaled snake	Taiwan and Japan in the southern Ryukyu Islands
	A. hainanus	C. Huang, 1975	0	Hainan odd-scaled snake	China on Hainan island
	A. huangjietangi	R. Huang, Peng & S. Huang, 2021	0	Huang's odd-scaled snake	Huangshan City, Anhui Province, China
	A. hunanensis	S. Ma, Shi, Xiang, Shu & J. Jiang, 2023		Hunan odd-scaled snake	Hunan Province, China
	A. jinggangensis	(Zong & J. Ma, 1983)	0	Zong's odd-scaled snake	China in Jiangxi
	A. juliani	Ziegler, T.Q. Nguyen, C. Pham, T.Th. Nguyen, A. Pham, van Schingen, Th.Th. Nguyen & Le, 2019	0	Julian's burrowing snake	Vietnam
	A. meiguensis	Hu & Zhao, 1966	0	Szechwan odd-scaled snake	China in western Sichuan at elevations of 1200–1400 m
	A. mirabilis	Xu et al., 2026	0	Kuocang Mountain Odd-scaled Snake	China
	A. niger	Maki, 1931	0	Black odd-scaled snake	Taiwan
	A. ningshanensis	Yang, R. Huang, K. Jiang, Burbrink & S. Huang, 2022	0	Ningshan odd-scaled snake	China
	A. panzhihuaensis	Hou, K. Wang, Guo, Chen, Yuan & Che, 2021	0	Panzhihua odd-scaled snake	China
	A. pingbianensis	K. Li, Yu, Y. Wu, Liao, K. Tang, Liu & Guo, 2020	0	Pingbian odd-scaled snake	China
	A. rufescens	Boulenger, 1888	0	Boulenger's odd-scaled snake	Northern Vietnam and China in Hong Kong, Hainan and west to Guizhou, Shaanxi, Guangdong and Fujian
	A. sheni	S. Ma, Xu, Qi, Y. Wang, S. Tang, Huang & J. Jiang, 2023	0	Shen's odd-scaled snake	Hunan Province, China
	A. spinalis	W. Peters, 1869	0	Peters' odd-scaled snake	Northern Vietnam, Japan (Kyūshū, Honshū, the Ryukyu Islands, Koshiki, Tokuno-shima: Kametoku and Inokawa), and central China (east to Fujian, west to Yunnan and Sichuan, and north to Gansu and Shaanxi. Also in Zhejiang, Jiangxi, Jiangsu and Hubei) at an elevation of 1,230 m
	A. timi	Ziegler, T.Q. Nguyen, C. Pham, T.Th. Nguyen, A. Pham, van Schingen, Th.Th. Nguyen & Le, 2019	0	Tim's burrowing snake	Vietnam
	A. tranganensis	Luu, Ziegler, Ha, Lo, Hoang, Ngo, Le, Tran & T.Q. Nguyen, 2020	0		Vietnam: Ninh Binh province
	A. vanhoensis	Ha, Ziegler, Sy, Le, T.Q. Nguyen & Luu, 2022	0		Vietnam
	A. werneri	Van Denburgh, 1912	0	Amami odd-scaled snake	Japan in the central Ryukyu Islands
	A. yangdatongi	Hou, K. Wang, Guo, Chen, Yuan & Che, 2021	0	Yang's odd-scaled snake	China
	A. yunkaiensis	J. Wang, Y. Li & Y. Wang, 2019	0	Yunkai Mountain's odd-scaled snake, Yunkai Mountain's burrowing snake	China
	A. zugorum	Miller, Davis, Luong, Do, C. Pham, Ziegler, Lee, de Queiroz, Reynolds & T.Q. Nguyen, 2020	0	Zug's odd-scaled snake	Northern Vietnam

*) Not including the nominate subspecies.

Nota bene: A taxon author (binomial authority) in parentheses indicates that the species was originally described in a genus other than Achalinus.
