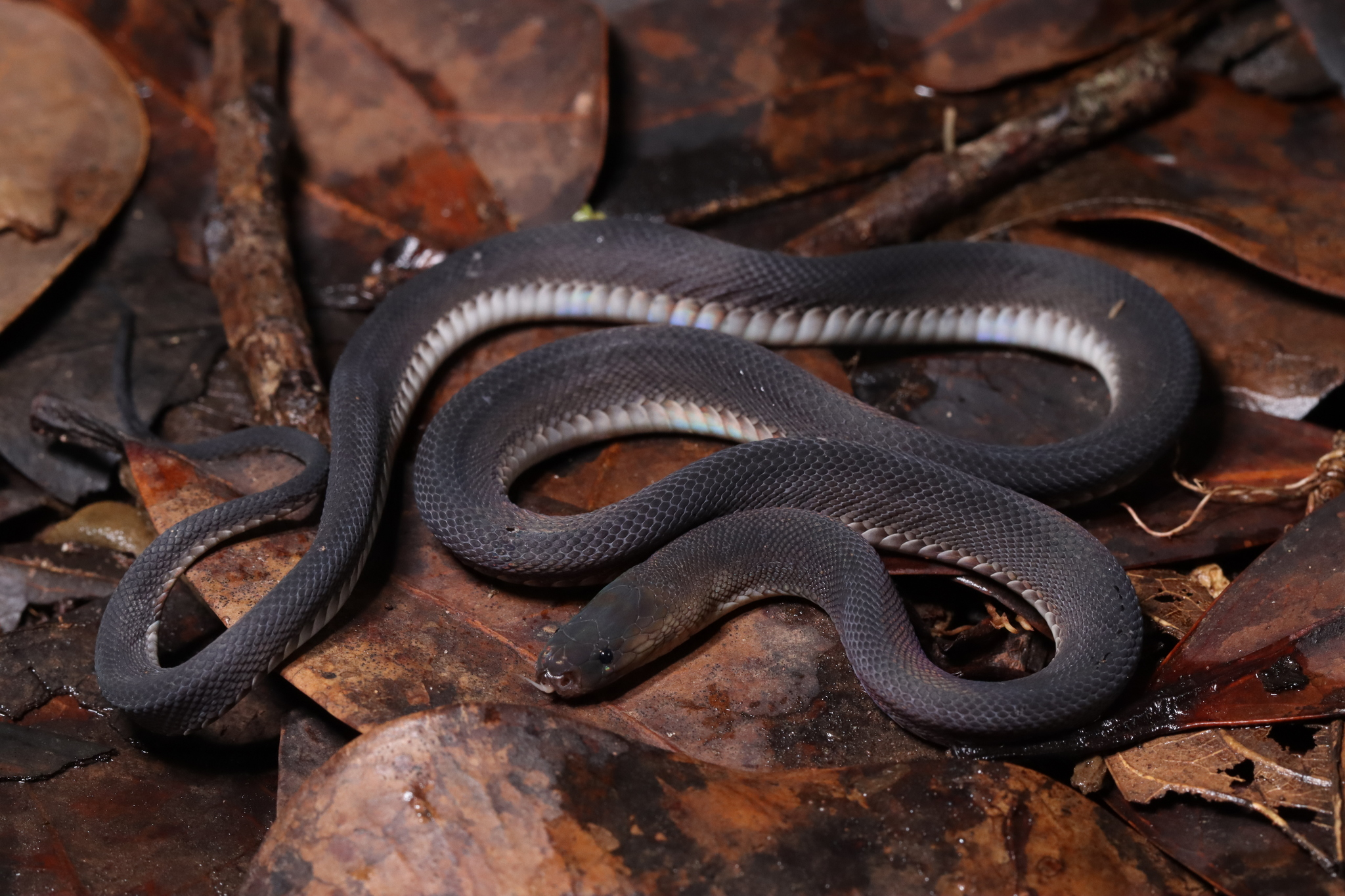
- Parafimbrios lao

Scientific classification
- Kingdom: Animalia
- Phylum: Chordata
- Class: Reptilia
- Order: Squamata
- Suborder: Serpentes
- Family: Xenodermidae
- Genus: Parafimbrios; Teynié, David, Lottier, Vidal & Nguyen, 2015

= Parafimbrios =

Genus of snakes

Parafimbrios is a genus of snakes belonging to the family Xenodermatidae.

The species of this genus are found in Asia.

== Species ==
Species:

- Parafimbrios lao Teynié, David, Lottier, Vidal & Nguyen, 2015
- Parafimbrios vietnamensis Ziegler, Ngo, Pham, Nguyen, Le & Nguyen, 2018
