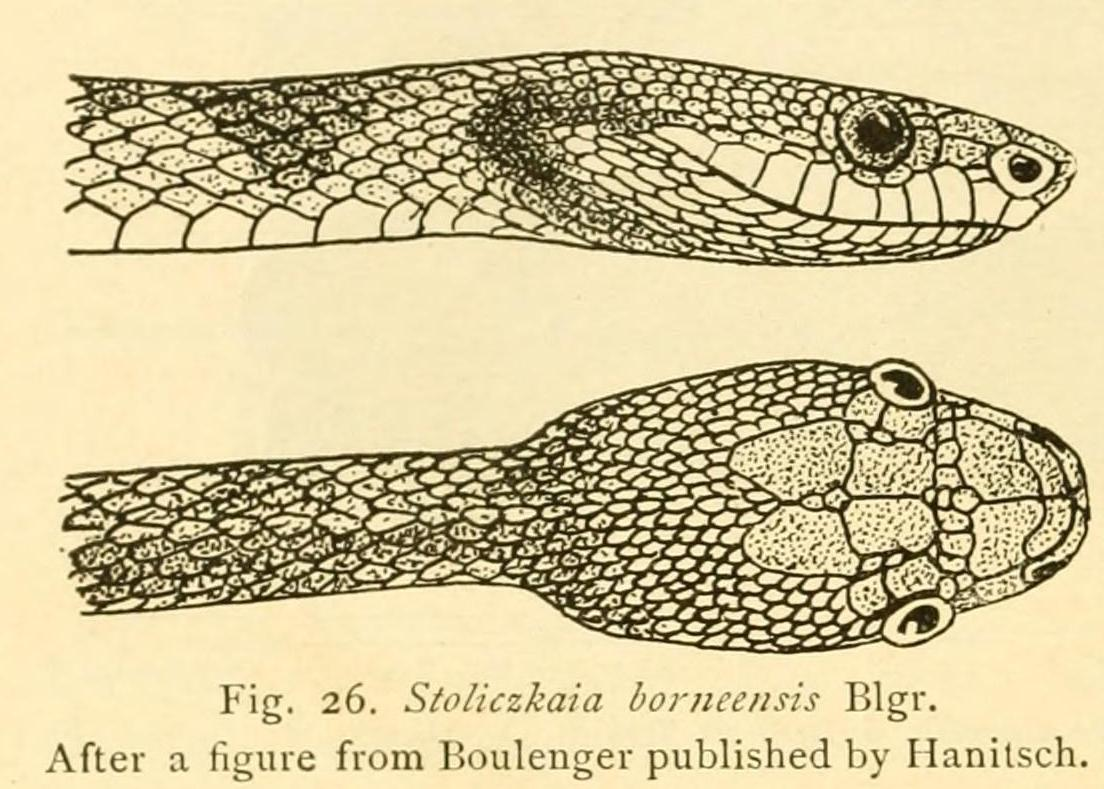
- Head of Paraxenodermus borneensis

Conservation status
- Least Concern (IUCN 3.1)

Scientific classification
- Kingdom: Animalia
- Phylum: Chordata
- Order: Squamata
- Suborder: Serpentes
- Family: Xenodermidae
- Genus: Paraxenodermus; Deepak, Lalronunga, Lalhmingliani, Das, Narayanan, Das, & Gower, 2021
- Species: P. borneensis

Binomial name
- Paraxenodermus borneensis (Boulenger, 1899)

Synonyms
- Stoliczkaia borneensis Boulenger, 1899

= Paraxenodermus =

Species of snake

Paraxenodermus borneensis (common names: Borneo red snake, Stolickza's stream snake) is a species of snake in the family Xenodermatidae. It is endemic to Borneo and known from Sabah, Sarawak (Malaysia), and West and Central Kalimantan (Indonesia). The holotype was collected from Mount Kinabalu by Richard Hanitsch.
