= Fimbrios =

Scientific classification
- Kingdom: Animalia
- Phylum: Chordata
- Class: Reptilia
- Order: Squamata
- Suborder: Serpentes
- Family: Xenodermidae
- Genus: Fimbrios; M.A. Smith, 1921

Genus of snakes

Fimbrios is a genus of snakes of the family Xenodermidae.

== Geographic range ==
The genus Fimbrios is endemic to Southeast Asia.

== Species ==
The following two species are recognized as being valid.

- Fimbrios klossi M.A. Smith, 1921 – Cambodia, Laos, Vietnam
- Fimbrios smithi Ziegler, David, Miralles, Doan & T.Q. Nguyen, 2008 – Vietnam

== Etymology ==
The specific names, klossi and smithi, are in honor of English zoologist Cecil Boden Kloss and British herpetologist Malcolm Arthur Smith, respectively.

== Morphology ==
The genus Fimbrios has distinct morphological characteristics such as: 30 to 35 equal-sized maxillary teeth; head not distinct from neck, covered with large shields; eye small, with vertically subelliptic pupil; nostril in the anterior part of a large concave nasal; loreal very large, extending from the nasal to the eye; rostral being separated from the inter-nasals by a horizontal ridge of tissue; rostral, mental and labials with raised, erected edges; a single pair of enlarged chin shields; body slender, cylindrical, dorsal scales elliptical, keeled, in 24 to 33 rows at midbody, those of the outer row enlarged; ventrals large, rounded; subcaudals unpaired; tail moderate.
