= Stoliczkia =

Scientific classification
- Kingdom: Animalia
- Phylum: Chordata
- Class: Reptilia
- Order: Squamata
- Suborder: Serpentes
- Family: Xenodermidae
- Genus: Stoliczkia; Jerdon, 1870

Type species
- Stoliczkia khasiensis Jerdon, 1870

Synonyms
- Stoliczkaia (misspelling)

Genus of snakes

Stoliczkia is a genus of snakes in the family Xenodermidae. The genus contains two species, both from India.

== Etymology ==
The genus is named after Ferdinand Stoliczka, Moravian-born zoologist who later worked for the Geological Survey of India. Many subsequent publications have used the spelling Stoliczkaia. However, Stoliczkia is considered valid because it was repeated twice in Jerdon's original publication, rendering a spelling error unlikely. Moreover, Stoliczkaia Neumayr 1875 is an ammonite genus.

== Species ==
There are two species:

- Stoliczkia khasiensis Jerdon, 1870 – Khasi earth snake, Khase red snake
- Stoliczkia vanhnuailianai Lalronunga, Lalhmangaiha, Zosangliana, Lalhmingliani, Gower, Das, & Deepak, 2021 – Lushai Hills dragon snake
