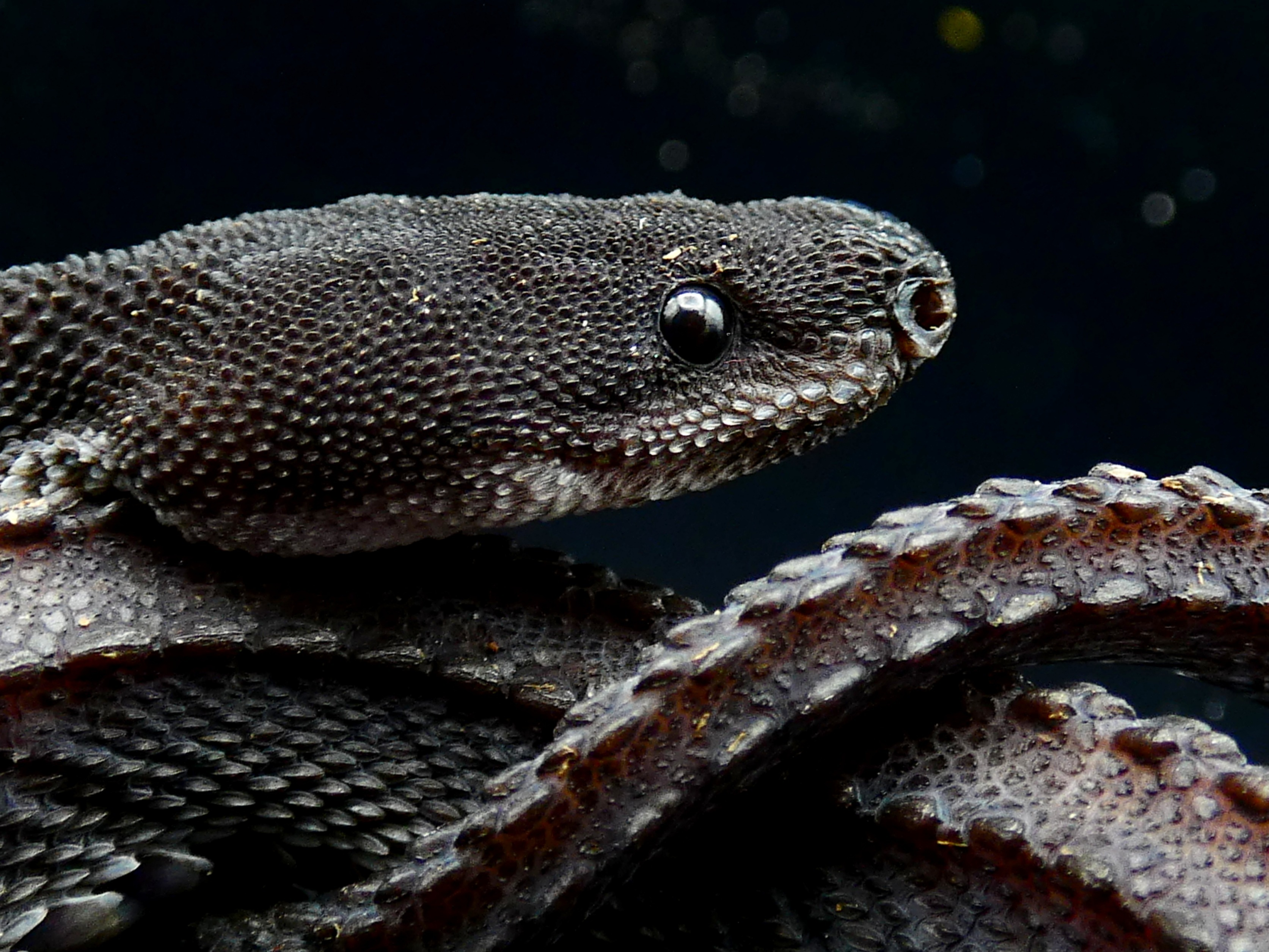

Conservation status
- Least Concern (IUCN 3.1)

Scientific classification
- Kingdom: Animalia
- Phylum: Chordata
- Class: Reptilia
- Order: Squamata
- Suborder: Serpentes
- Family: Xenodermidae
- Genus: Xenodermus; Reinhardt, 1836
- Species: X. javanicus

Binomial name
- Xenodermus javanicus Reinhardt, 1836

= Xenodermus =

Xenodermus javanicus

Genus of snakes

Xenodermus javanicus, also known as the dragon snake, Javan tubercle snake, Javan mudsnake, or rough-backed litter snake, is a small, non-venomous, semi-fossorial snake species belonging to the monotypic genus Xenodermus. This species is best known for their characteristic dorsal scales and interesting defense mechanism in which they stiffen their entire bodies when threatened. X. javanicus is nocturnal and subsists on a diet of frogs, tadpoles and small fish. They most often perish once placed into captivity; only a few herpetoculturists have been successful in keeping them.

== Distribution and habitat ==
Xenodermus javanicus is found in the Malay Peninsula (Malaysia, Thailand, and one old record from the southernmost tip of Myanmar) and parts of the Greater Sunda Islands (Sumatra, Java, and Borneo, as well as some smaller islands). It inhabits damp areas near water, including forests, swamps, marshes, and rice fields, at elevations below 1,300 m (4,300 ft), but most commonly between 500–1,100 m (1,600–3,600 ft) above sea level.

== Description ==
Xenodermus javanicus has a distinct head and long tail. The body is slender and compressed. The total length is about 50 cm (20 in). Males can be distinguished from females by examining the overall size, tail thickness, tail length, and cloacal vent for the presence of a hemipenial bulge: Females will be larger than males; have thinner, shorter tails, and lack a hemipenial bulge. Conversely, males will be smaller in comparison, have thicker, longer tails and exhibit a hemipenial bulge.

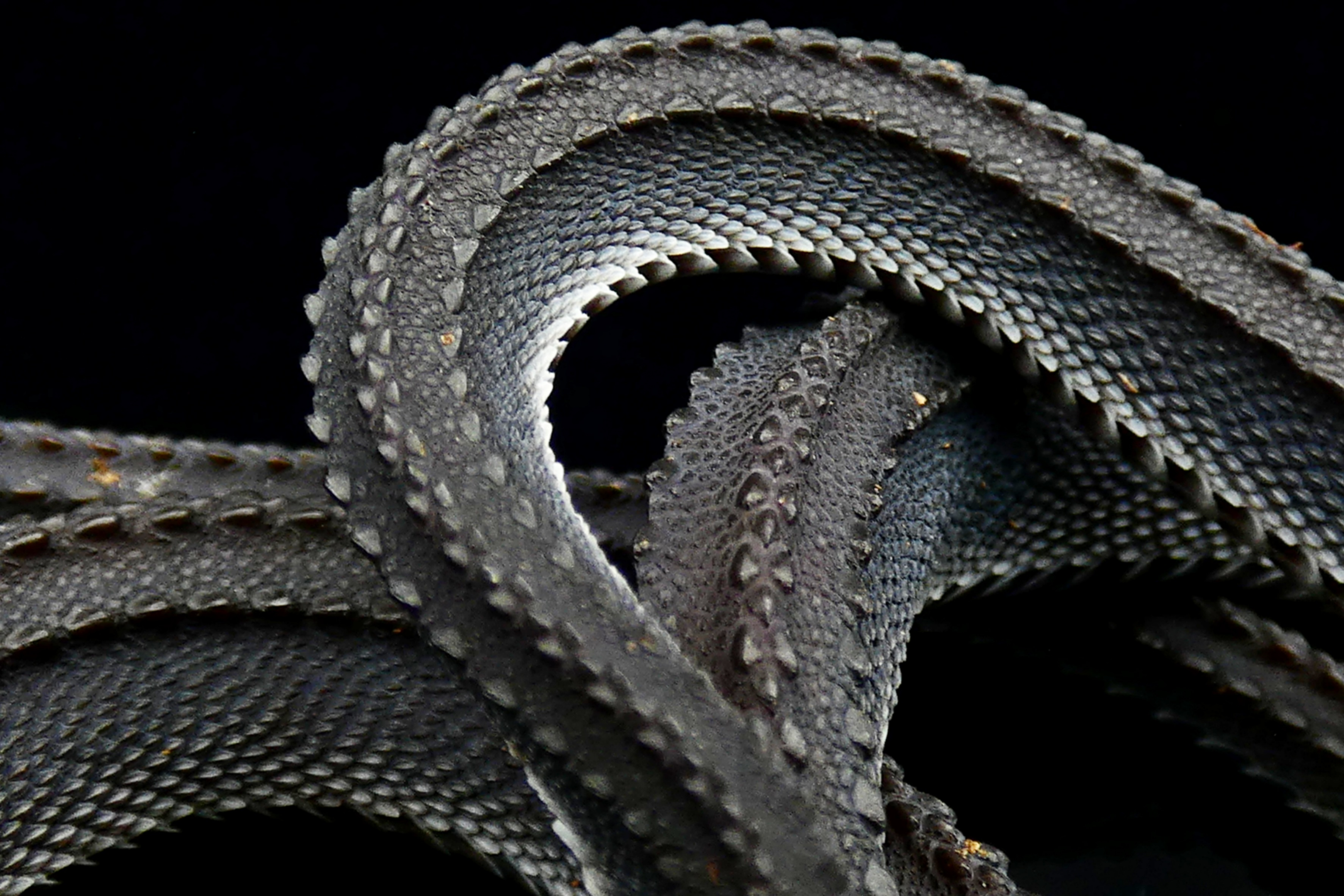
Scalation of Xenodermus javanicus

== Differentiation of sex chromosomes and karyotype characterization ==
Xenodermus javanicus has an unusual chromosomal number of 2n = 32 , contrasting with the most typical snake karyotype with a stable chromosomal number of 2 n = 36 . The karyotype includes heteromorphic ZZ/ZW sex chromosomes with a heterochromatic W.

== Behavior ==
=== Breeding ===
Xenodermus javanicus undergo reproduction by egg and have low fecundity (2–4 eggs).

=== Activity pattern ===
Xenodermus javanicus are nocturnal.

=== Diet ===
Xenodermus javanicus subsist mainly on frogs, tadpoles, and small fish.

=== Behaviors ===
Xenodermus javanicus exhibit a peculiar property when encountering perceived threats in which they stiffen their entire body to defend themselves. They may also emit a foul-smelling odour called a musk.

== Conservation status ==
Xenodermus javanicus are rare in the northern parts of their range, but are common in Java. There seem to be no major threats to them, and they can persist in wet agricultural lands such as rice fields. They could be potentially threatened by agricultural pollutants.
