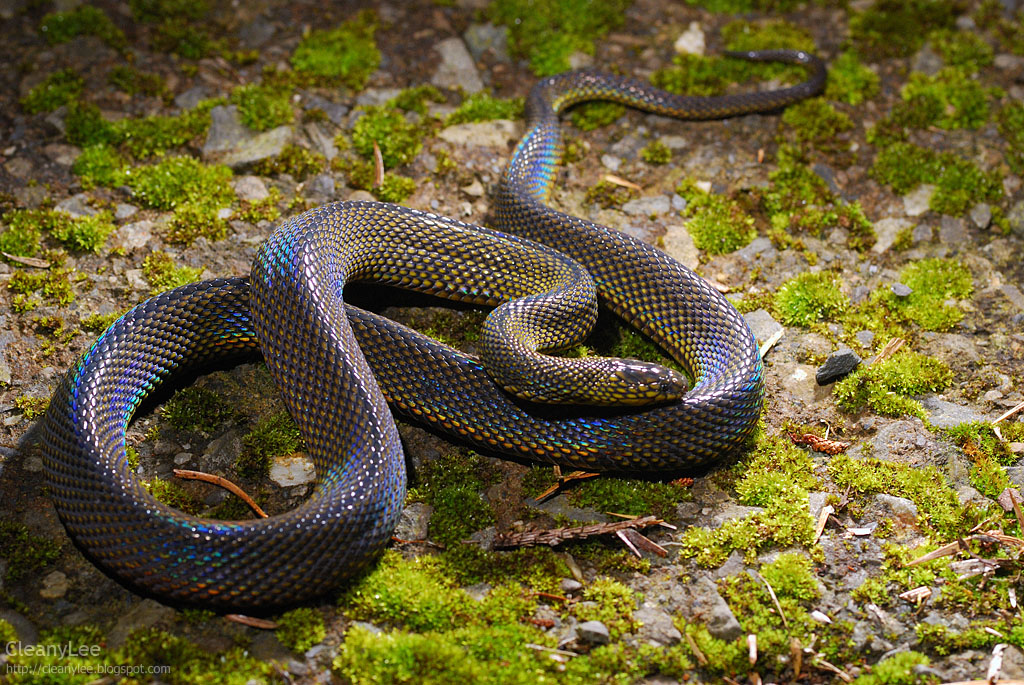
- Formosa odd-scaled snake, A. f. formosanus

Scientific classification
- Kingdom: Animalia
- Phylum: Chordata
- Class: Reptilia
- Order: Squamata
- Suborder: Serpentes
- Clade: Colubroides
- Family: Xenodermidae; Gray, 1849

Genera
- 6 genera, see the text

Synonyms
- Xenodermatinae Gray, 1849; Xenodermidae Gray, 1849

= Xenodermidae =

Family of snakes

Xenodermidae is a family of snakes native to East Asia, South Asia, and Southeast Asia. All species in the family Xenodermidae are small or moderately sized snakes, never more than 80 cm (31 in) but typically less than 55 cm (22 in) in total length (including tail). They are secretive, probably nocturnal, and typically inhabit moist forest habitats. They seem to be opportunistic carnivores, preying on other vertebrates.

The correct spelling of the family name is Xenodermidae, not "Xenodermatidae".

== Taxonomy and systematics ==
Xenodermidae have a basal position in the colubroid radiation. However, their exact position is not yet settled, e.g., that they might be the sister taxon of the rest of Colubroidea, or that their sister taxon is Acrochordidae, and that these two families together form a clade that is the sister taxon for the Colubroidea.

== Genera ==
The family consists of the following 6 genera:

- Achalinus W. Peters, 1869
- Fimbrios M.A. Smith, 1921
- Parafimbrios Teynié, David, Lottier, Le, Vidal & Nguyen 2015
- Paraxenodermus Deepak, Lalronunga, Lalhmingliani, Das, Narayanan, Das, & Gower, 2021
- Stoliczkia Jerdon, 1870
- Xenodermus J.T. Reinhardt, 1836
