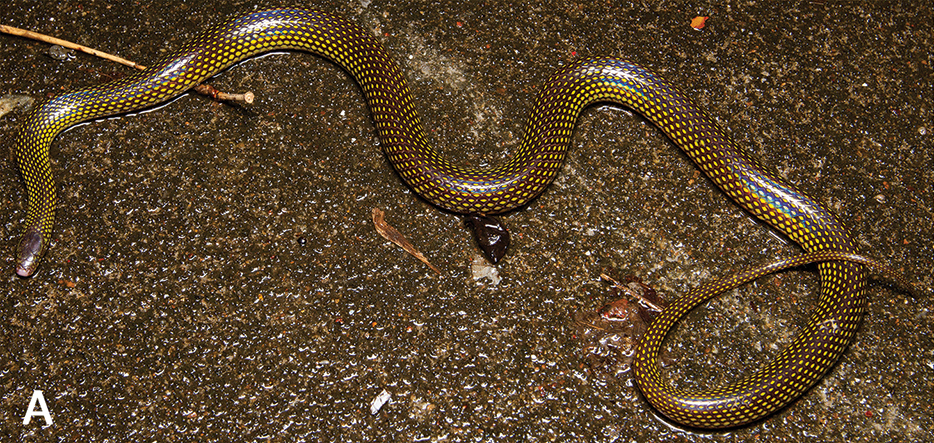
- Holotype male
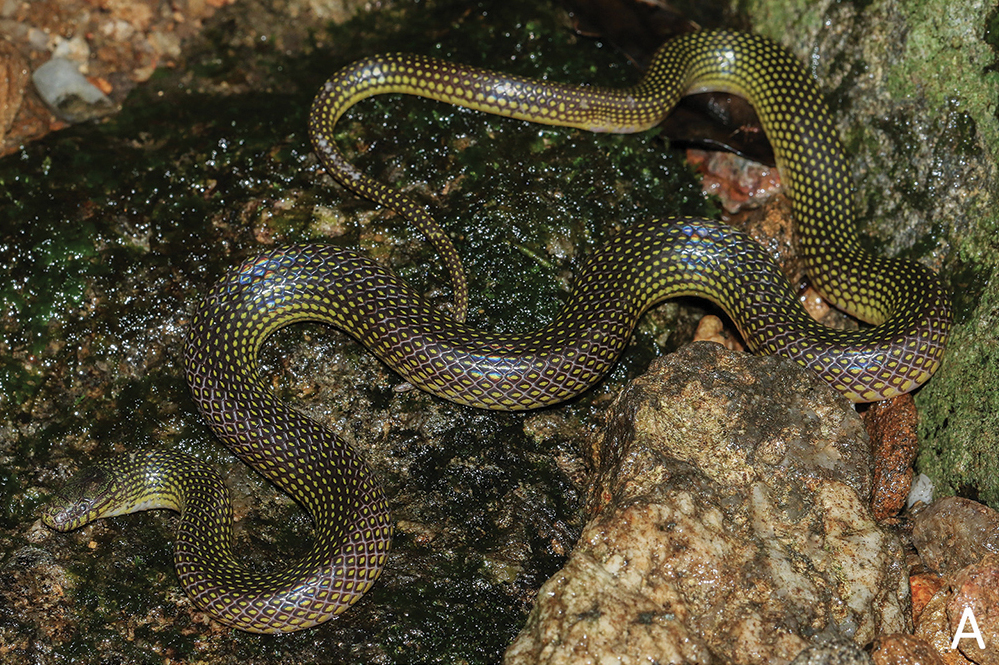
- Paratype female

Scientific classification
- Kingdom: Animalia
- Phylum: Chordata
- Class: Reptilia
- Order: Squamata
- Suborder: Serpentes
- Family: Colubridae
- Genus: Opisthotropis
- Species: O. hungtai

Binomial name
- Opisthotropis hungtai Wang et al., 2020

= Opisthotropis hungtai =

Species of snake

Opisthotropis hungtai, also known as Hung-Ta Chang's mountain keelback, is a species of snake in the family Colubridae. It is a slender, cylindrical snake with a total length of 393.2–511 cm (155–201 in), snout–vent length of 312–413 cm (123–163 in), and tail length of 81.2–180.5 cm (31.97–71.06 in). The upper side of the head is glossy dark with scattered yellow flecking, the chin shields are yellow with brownish-black mottling at the margins, and eyes are black. The body and tail are glossy dark brown with a single yellow spot on each scale, the ventral scales are yellow with brownish-black margins and flecking, and the subcaudal scales yellow with brownish-black margins. Hung-Ta Chang's mountain keelback can be distinguished from other species in its genus by a combination of its measurements, scalation, and coloration.

The species is endemic to mountainous regions in China, where it has been collected from western Guangdong and southeastern Guangxi. It inhabits rocky streams surrounded by dense deciduous forest. It is threatened by the illegal wildlife trade and requires further study to better understand its population size and distribution.

== Taxonomy ==
Opisthotropis hungtai was formally described by the Chinese herpetologist Jian Wang and his colleagues in 2020 based on an adult male specimen collected from the Heishiding Nature Reserve in Guangdong, China, in September 2014. Before the description of the species, specimens were misidentified as being O. maculosa by several authors between 2007 and 2018. The specific epithet huntai honors the Chinese botanist Hung-ta Chang, who founded the Tropical and Subtropical Forest Ecosystem Experimental Center in Heishiding Nature Reserve and helped advance ecological research in southern China. The authors of the description recommended the English common name 'Hung-Ta Chang's mountain keelback' and the Chinese common name 张氏后棱蛇 (Zhang Shi Hou Leng She).

Hung-Ta Chang's mountain keelback is one of over 20 species in the mountain keelback genus Opisthotropis in the family Colubridae. The 2020 study describing the species studied its relationship with 16 other species in its genus and found it to be most closely related to O. haihaensis; these two species were most closely related to a clade formed by O. voquyi and O. jacobi. The following cladogram shows relationships within this clade according to the 2020 study.

- Opisthotropis
  - - O. hungtai
    - O. haihaensis
  - - O. voquyi
    - O. jacobi

== Description ==
Hung-Ta Chang's mountain keelback is a slender, cylindrical snake with a total length of 393.2–511 cm (155–201 in) in females and 464.3–501.2 cm (182.8–197.3 in) in males. The snout–vent length varies from 318–401.6 cm (125–158 in) in males and 312–413 cm (123–163 in) in females, while the tail length is 111.1–180.5 cm (43.74–71.06 in) in males and 81.2–99.6 cm (32.0–39.2 in) in females. The holotype male specimen had glossy dark brown scales with scattered yellow flecking on the upperside of the head, yellow chin shields with brownish black mottling at the margins, and black eyes. The body and tail are glossy dark brown with a single yellow spot on each scale, the spots getting larger towards the sides of the body. The ventral scales are yellow with brownish black lateral margins and a few scattered brown flecks, while the subcaudal scales are yellow with brownish black margins towards the front and sides. The scales on the body and tail are generally smooth, but are keeled on the underside of the tail. Other specimens of the species were very similar-looking to the holotype, but had more maxillary teeth, ventral scales, and subcaudal scales, and a relatively longer tail.

When preserved in 70% ethanol, the upper side of the head and body surface are dark brown and the underside is yellowish-beige. The dorsal scales have a light yellow blotch in the center, which become wider towards the side of the body. The tail scales on the underside also have light central blotches, while the underside of the head has indistinct light mottling, more obvious on temporal scales. The supralabial scales have a light blotch, and the infralabial scales, chin shields, and smaller throat scales in front of the ventral scales are light yellow with brown mottling or blotches. The belly has some scattered dark flecks and the outermost edges of light ventral scales are brown. The subcaudal scales turn light yellow with black towards the front and sides.

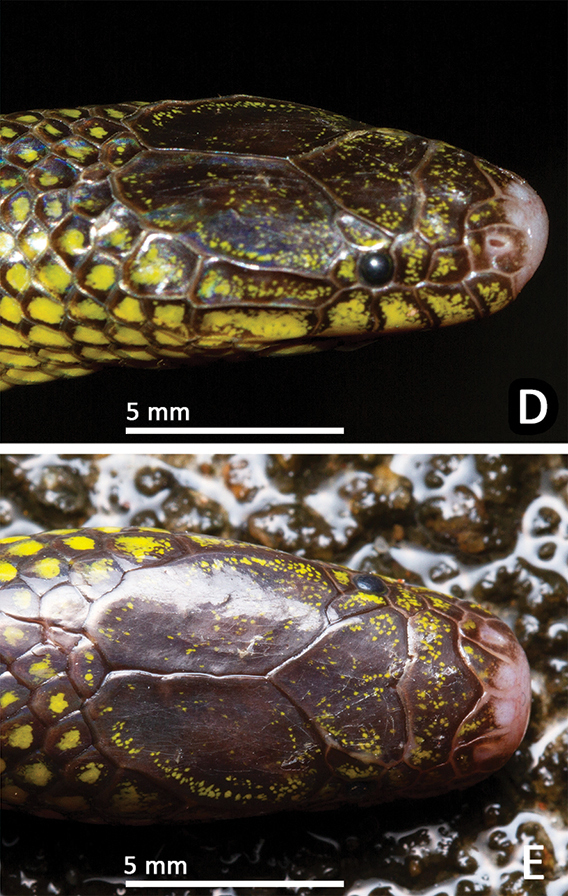
Male head

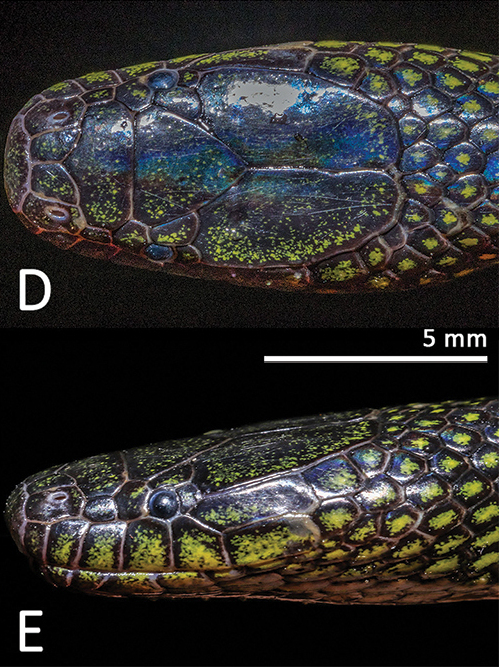
Female head

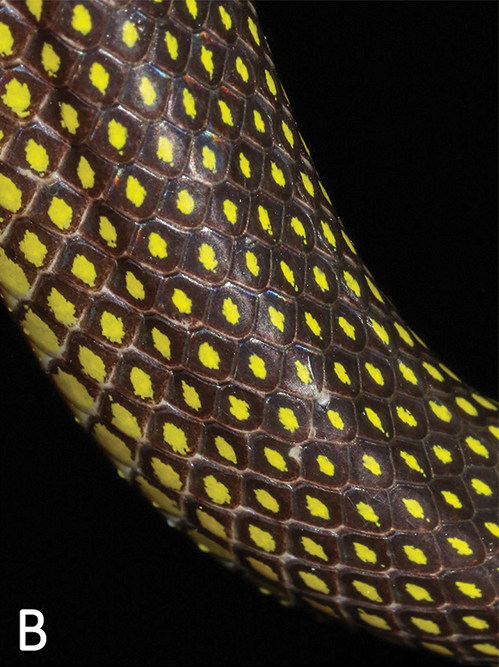
Female scale coloration

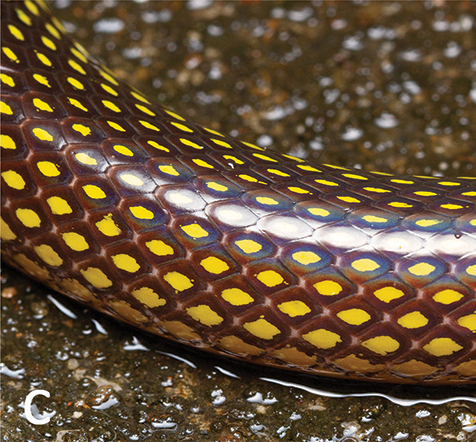
Male scale coloration

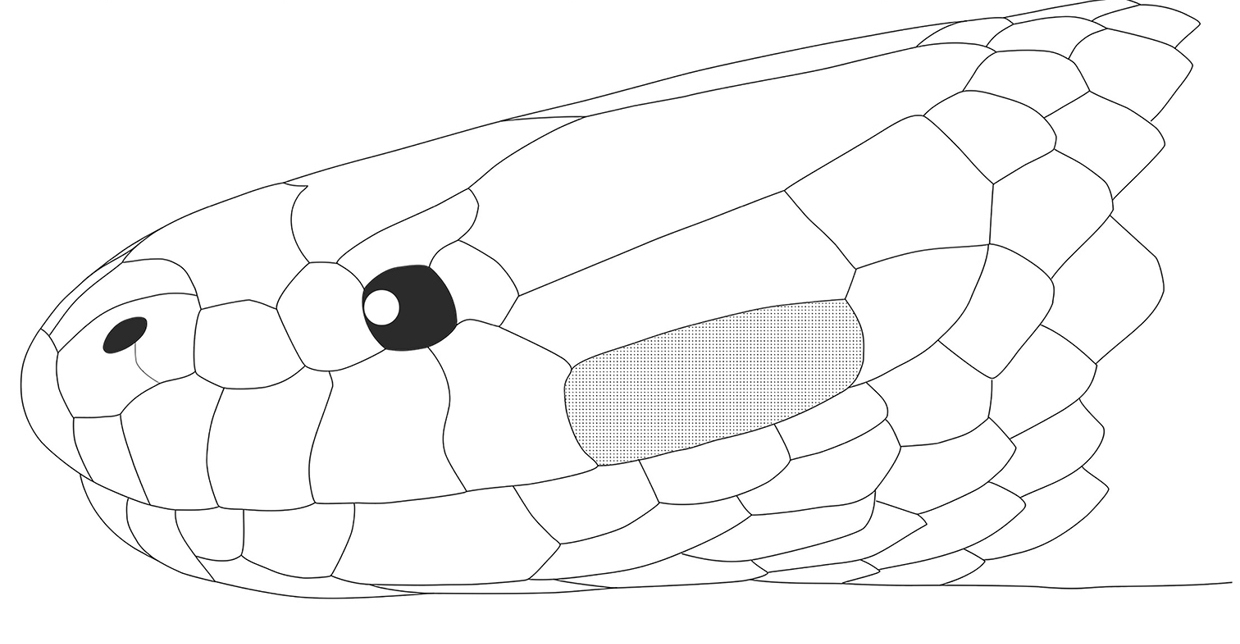
Illustration showing head scalation in Hung-Ta Chang's mountain keelback

Hung-Ta Chang's mountain keelback can be distinguished from other species in its genus by a combination of its measurements, scalation, and coloration. The tail is moderately long, with a tail length to total length ratio of 0.20–0.26 in males and 0.19–0.22 in females. The internasal scales do not touch the loreal scale and the prefrontal scale does not touch the supraocular scale, while the frontal scale touches the preocular scale. There is one preocular scale and one or two postocular scales, 1+1 temporal scales, and seven supralabial scales, of which the fourth and fifth touch the eye. There are 16–18 maxillary teeth. The chin shields are yellow with brownish black mottling and the frontal pair is longer than or equal to the posterior pair. There are 170–189 rows of ventral scales in males and 168–175 in females, while both sexes have 2 rows of preventral scales. There are 76–98 rows of subcaudal scales in males and 69–84 in females. The nasal cleft points to the second supralabial scale. The body scales are smooth and the tail scales are smooth or indistinctly keeled (having a ridge down the centre). In overall coloration, the body and underside of the tail are dark, with a light spot on each scale.

The species looks similar to and could be confused with O. haihaensis and O. maculosa. It differs from O. haihaensis in having seven supralabials, the second last of which is significantly enlarged, narrow, long, and significantly wider than it is high, and 16–18 maxillary teeth. It can be told apart from O. maculosa by its prefrontal scale not touching the supraocular scales, the frontal scale touching the preocular scales, the fourth and fifth supralabials touching the eye, the frontal pair of chin shields being longer than or equal to the posterior pair, a larger number of subcaudals in males, and by chin shields having brownish black mottling instead of being unmarked.

== Distribution and ecology ==
Hung-Ta Chang's mountain keelback is endemic to mountainous regions in China, where it has been collected from Heishiding Nature Reserve and Dawuling Forestry Station in western Guangdong and Mount Wuhuang in southeastern Guangxi. Like other mountain keelbacks, Hung-Ta Chang's mountain keelback inhabits rocky streams; specimens have been collected in pelitic streams and gutterways next to dirt paths in Guangdong and in streams in Guangxi. The habitat near these spots consisted of dense deciduous forest. Many species of mountain keelback, including Hung-Ta Chang's mountain keelback, are threatened by the illegal wildlife trade due to their attractive coloration. Additionally, surveys in southern China are needed to better understand the species' population size and distribution.
