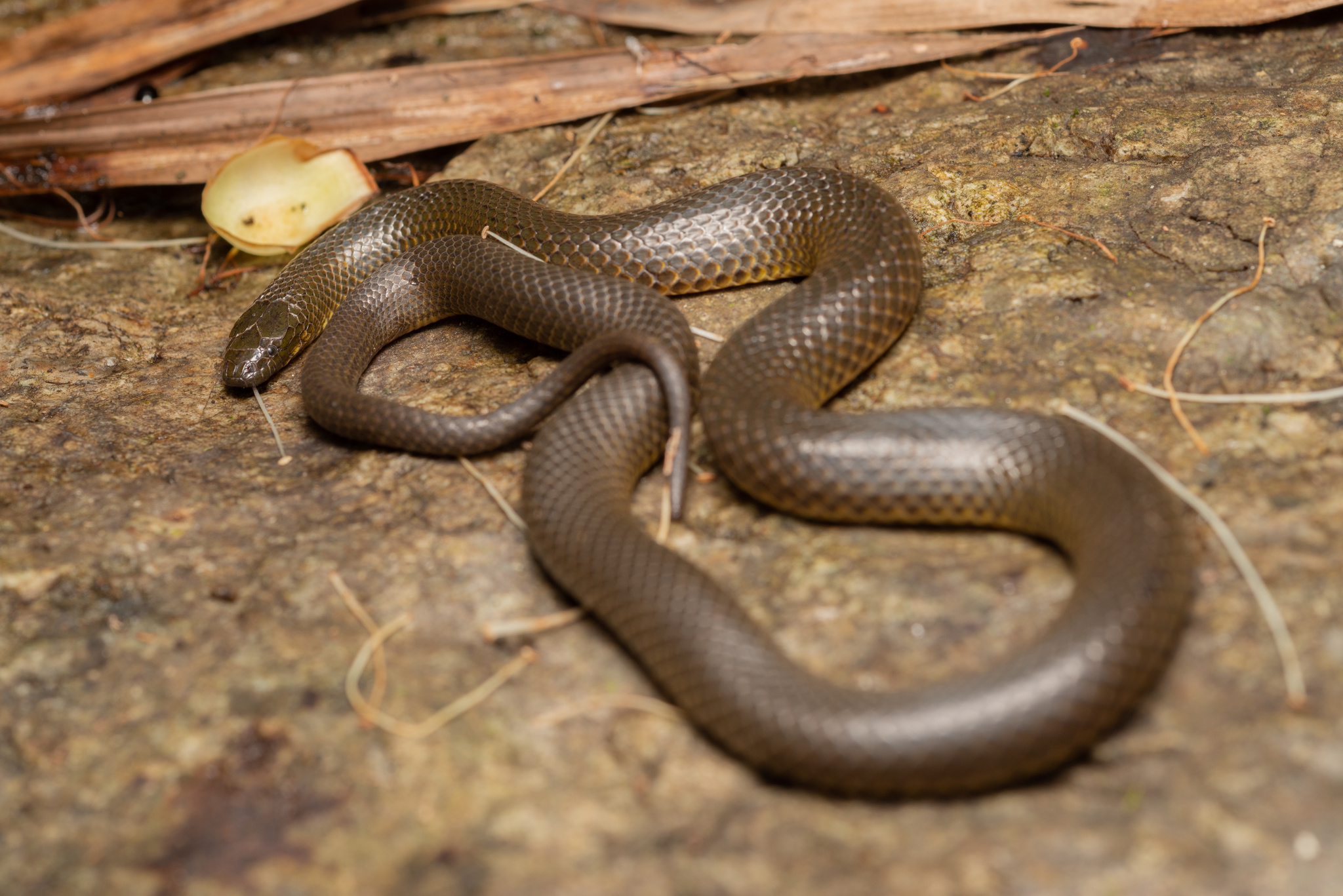
- Opisthotropis andersonii

Scientific classification
- Kingdom: Animalia
- Phylum: Chordata
- Class: Reptilia
- Order: Squamata
- Suborder: Serpentes
- Family: Colubridae
- Subfamily: Natricinae
- Genus: Opisthotropis; Günther, 1872

= Opisthotropis =

Genus of snakes

Opisthotropis is a genus of snakes in the subfamily Natricinae of the family Colubridae. The genus is native to Southeast Asia and South China.

== Species ==
The genus Opisthotropis contains the following 25 species which are recognized as being valid, listed alphabetically by scientific name.

- Opisthotropis alcalai W. Brown & Leviton, 1961 – Gary's mountain keelback
- Opisthotropis andersonii (Boulenger, 1888) – Anderson's stream snake
- Opisthotropis atra Günther, 1872
- Opisthotropis cheni Zhao, 1999
- Opisthotropis cucae David, Pham, T.Q. Nguyen & T. Ziegler, 2011 (found in Kontum, Vietnam) – Cuc's mountain snake
- Opisthotropis daovantieni Orlov, Darevsky & Murphy, 1998 – Tien's mountain stream snake
- Opisthotropis durandi Teynié, Lottier, David, T.Q. Nguyen & G. Vogel, 2014 – Durand's mountain stream snake
- Opisthotropis guangxiensis Zhao, Y.-M. Jiang & Huang, 1978 – Guangxi mountain keelback
- Opisthotropis haihaensis T. Ziegler, Pham, T.V. Nguyen, T.Q. Nguyen, J. Wang, Y.-Y. Wang, Stuart & Le, 2019 – Hai Ha mountain stream keelback
- Opisthotropis hungtai J. Wang, Lyu, Zeng, Lin, Yang, T.Q. Nguyen, Le, T. Ziegler & Y.-Y. Wang, 2020 – Hung-Ta Chang's mountain keelback
- Opisthotropis jacobi Angel & Bourret, 1933 – Chapa mountain keelback
- Opisthotropis kikuzatoi (Okada & Takara, 1958) – Kikuzato's brook snake
- Opisthotropis kuatunensis Pope, 1928 – Chinese mountain keelback
- Opisthotropis lateralis Boulenger, 1903 – Tonkin mountain keelback
- Opisthotropis latouchii (Boulenger, 1899) – Sichuan mountain keelback
- Opisthotropis laui Yang, Sung & Chan, 2013 - Lau's mountain stream snake
- Opisthotropis maculosa Stuart & Chuaynkern, 2007 – yellow-spotted mountain stream snake
- Opisthotropis maxwelli Boulenger, 1914 – Maxwell's mountain keelback
- Opisthotropis rugosa (Lidth de Jeude, 1890) – Sumatran stream snake
- Opisthotropis shenzhenensis Y.-Y. Wang, Q. Guo, Liu, Lyu, J. Wang, Luo, Sun & Zhang, 2017 – Shenzhen mountain stream snake
- Opisthotropis spenceri M.A. Smith, 1918 – Spencer’s stream snake or Smith's mountain keelback
- Opisthotropis tamdaoensis T. Ziegler, David & Vu, 2008
- Opisthotropis typica (Mocquard, 1890) – olive mountain keelback
- Opisthotropis voquyi T. Ziegler, David, T.N. Ziegler, Pham, T.Q. Nguyen & Le, 2018 – Vo Quy's mountain stream keelback
- Opisthotropis zhaoermii Ren, K. Wang, K. Jiang, P. Guo & Li, 2017 – Zhao's mountain stream snake

Nota bene: A binomial authority in parentheses indicates that the species was originally described in a genus other than Opisthotropis.
