= Opisthotropis alcalai =

Conservation status
- Endangered (IUCN 3.1)

Scientific classification
- Kingdom: Animalia
- Phylum: Chordata
- Class: Reptilia
- Order: Squamata
- Suborder: Serpentes
- Family: Colubridae
- Genus: Opisthotropis
- Species: O. alcalai

Binomial name
- Opisthotropis alcalai Brown & Leviton, 1961

Species of snake

Opisthotropis alcalai, Gary's mountain keelback , is a species of natricine snake found in the Philippines.
