= Opisthotropis typica =

Conservation status
- Least Concern (IUCN 3.1)

Scientific classification
- Kingdom: Animalia
- Phylum: Chordata
- Class: Reptilia
- Order: Squamata
- Suborder: Serpentes
- Family: Colubridae
- Genus: Opisthotropis
- Species: O. typica

Binomial name
- Opisthotropis typica (Mocquard, 1890)

Species of snake

Opisthotropis typica, the olive mountain keelback, is a species of natricine snake found in the Philippines, Indonesia, and Malaysia.

== Habitat ==
They inhabit forests, particularly subtropical/tropical moist lowland forest, and wetlands, such as permanent rivers, streams, or creeks including waterfalls.

== Nature ==
They are active during the night. They reproduce through production of eggs that have membranes and/or shells.
