= Opisthotropis rugosa =

Conservation status
- Least Concern (IUCN 3.1)

Scientific classification
- Kingdom: Animalia
- Phylum: Chordata
- Class: Reptilia
- Order: Squamata
- Suborder: Serpentes
- Family: Colubridae
- Genus: Opisthotropis
- Species: O. rugosa

Binomial name
- Opisthotropis rugosa (Lidth de Jeude, 1890)

Species of snake

Opisthotropis rugosa, the Sumatran stream snake, is a species of natricine snake found on Sumatra in Indonesia.
