= Opisthotropis lateralis =

Conservation status
- Least Concern (IUCN 3.1)

Scientific classification
- Kingdom: Animalia
- Phylum: Chordata
- Class: Reptilia
- Order: Squamata
- Suborder: Serpentes
- Family: Colubridae
- Genus: Opisthotropis
- Species: O. lateralis

Binomial name
- Opisthotropis lateralis Boulenger, 1903

Species of snake

Opisthotropis lateralis, the Tonkin mountain keelback, is a species of natricine snake found in Vietnam and China.
