= Yongchun County =

Yongchun County 永春县 Eng Chun
- County
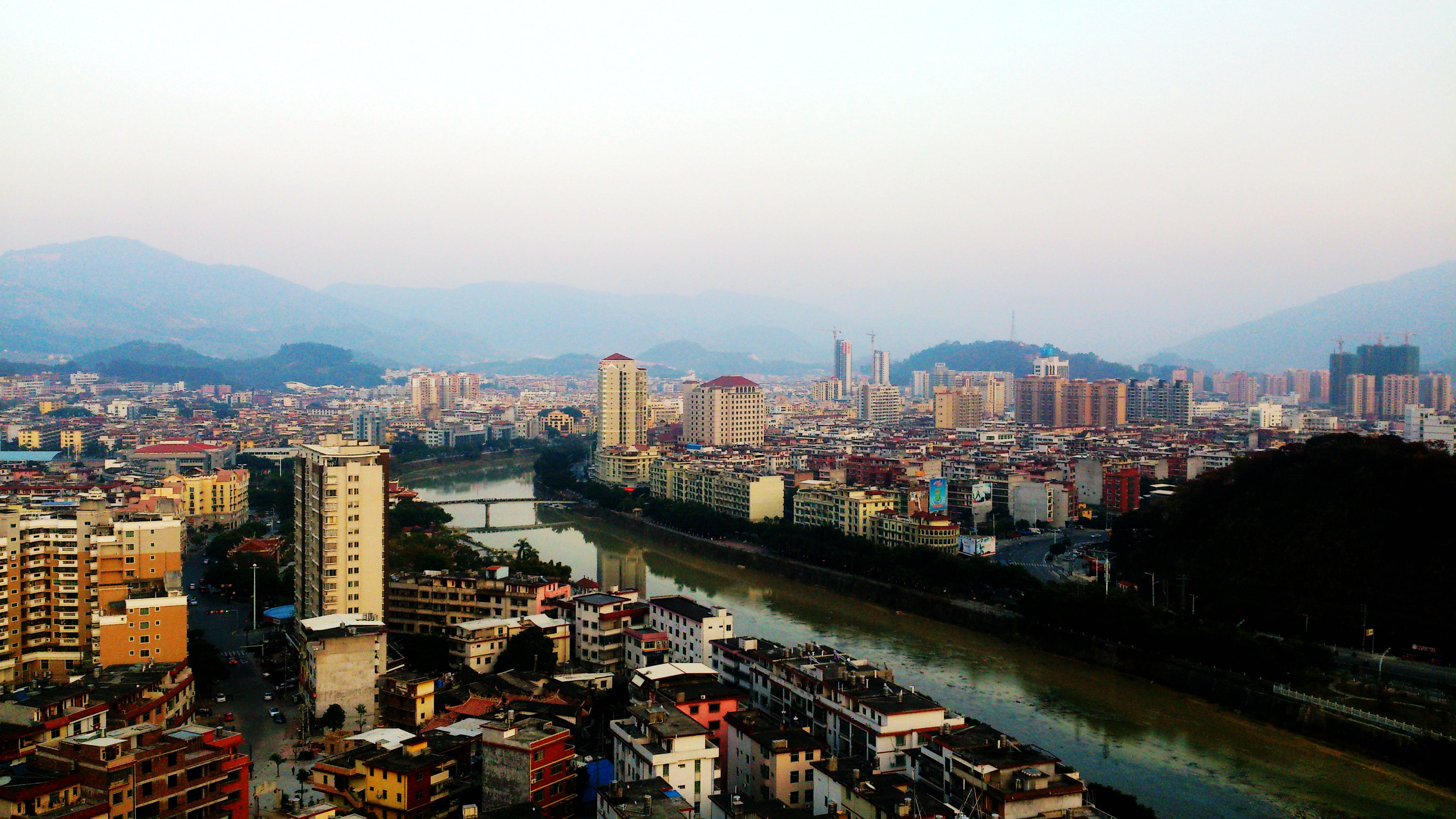

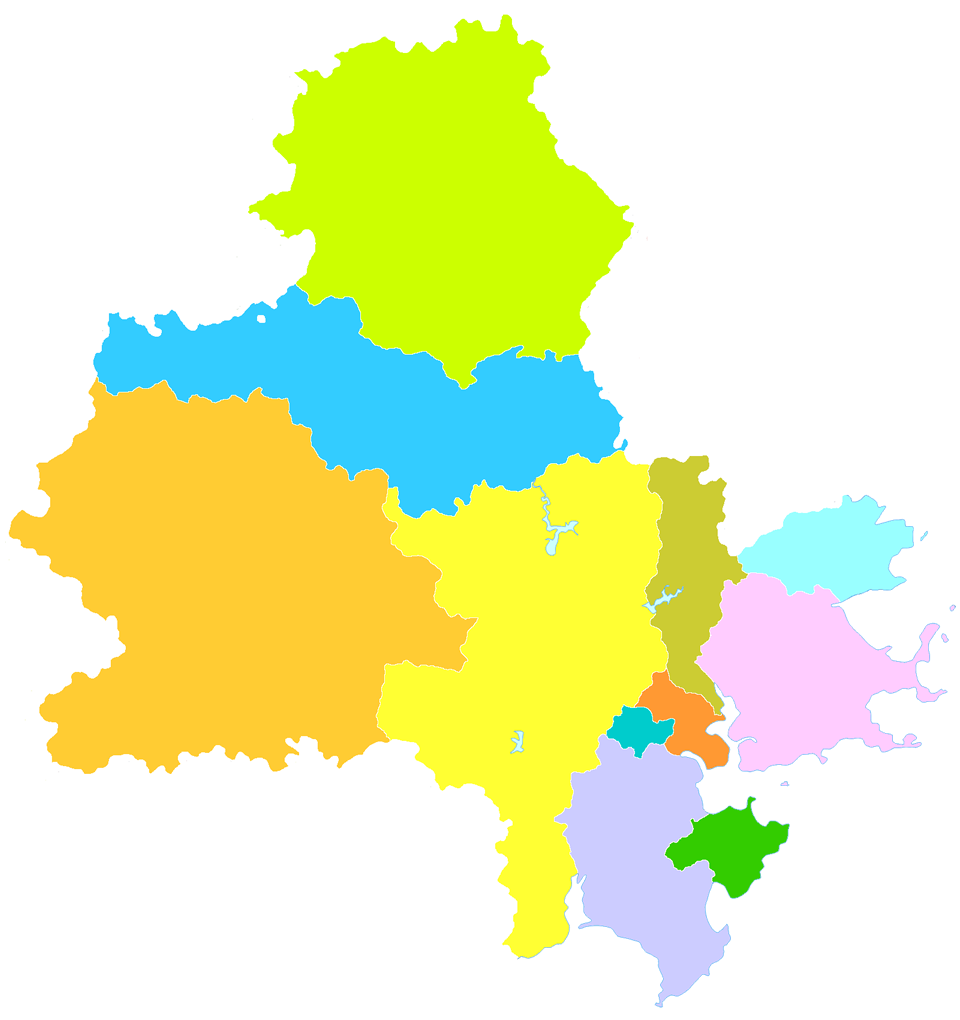
- Yongchun in Quanzhou

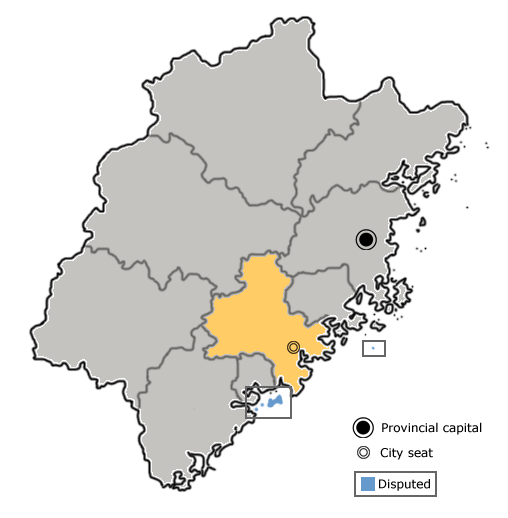
- Quanzhou in Fujian
- Coordinates: 25°19′12″N 118°17′20″E
- Country: People's Republic of China
- Province: Fujian
- Prefecture-level city: Quanzhou
- County seat: Taocheng (桃城镇)

Area
  - Total: 1,469 km^{2} (567 sq mi)
- Elevation: 121 m (397 ft)

Population (2020 census)
  - Total: 422,531
  - Density: 287.6/km^{2} (745.0/sq mi)
- Time zone: UTC+8 (China Standard)
- Postal code: 362600
- Area code: 0595
- Website: fjyc.gov.cn

Yongchun (Chinese: 永春; pinyin: Yǒngchūn; Min Nan: Íng-tshun; lit. 'eternal spring') is a county in western Quanzhou city of southern Fujian province, People's Republic of China, located on the upper reaches of the Jin River. It is under the administration of Quanzhou City. As of 2020, it had a total population of 422,531 residing in an area of 1,469 square kilometres (567 sq mi).

Many overseas Chinese in Southeast Asia have ancestors from Yongchun.

The county's historical sites include the Dongguan Bridge, an ancient covered bridge with a number of shrines inside. Originally built in 1145 and renovated a number of times since, the bridge is located in Dongmei village of Dongguan Township, on the road from Yongchun to the neighboring Xianyou County.

In 2011, the Taiwanese temple of goddess Mazu in Xingang opened a branch Mazu temple in the county, located in Chenban village. Instrumental to this foundation was Professor Chen, of the Chinese Academy of Social Sciences in Beijing, a scholar of goddess Mazu whose family lived in Chenban village, who in 2010 attended a conference in Xingang. The Xingang Mazu Temple funded the construction, and Professor Chen secured the necessary authorizations in Yongchun County to expand an existing temple to the Daoist Master Zhang Daoling by adding a Mazu Black Hall. The statue of Mazu is carried in procession through the county during the Chinese New Year holidays. The fame of the temple has helped placing Chenban village, whose name according to Professor Chen "nobody had ever heard before" on the map.

Yongchun is home to a Chinese martial art called Yongchun White Crane Kung Fu. The style was founded in the 17th century and Yongchun remains its ancestral centre to this day.

== Administration ==
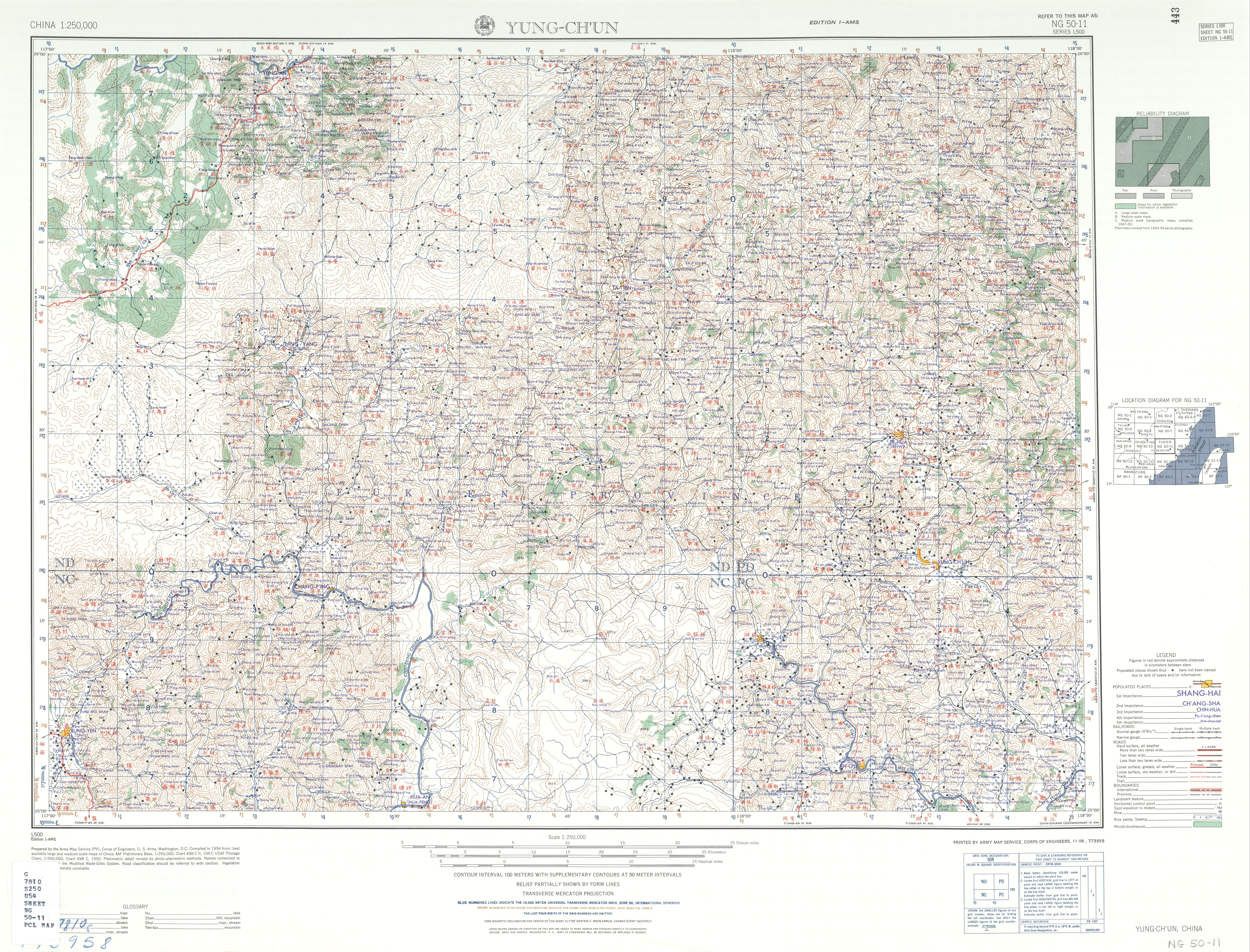
Map of Yongchun (labeled as YUNG-CH'UN 永春) and surrounding region (1954)

=== Towns (镇, zhen) ===
The county oversees 18 towns:

- Taocheng (桃城镇)—the county seat
- Xiayang (下洋镇)
- Penghu (蓬壶镇)
- Wulijie (五里街镇)
- Hushan (岵山镇)
- Huyang (湖洋镇)
- Yidu (一都镇)
- Kengzaikou (坑仔口镇)
- Yudou (玉斗镇)
- Jindou (锦斗镇)
- Dapu (达埔镇)
- Wufeng (吾峰镇)
- Shigu (石鼓镇)
- Dongping (东平镇)
- Dongguan (东关镇)
- Guiyang (桂洋镇)
- Sukeng (苏坑镇)
- Xianjia (仙夹镇)

=== Townships ===
There are 4 townships (乡, xiāng):

- Hengkou Township (横口乡)
- Chengxiang Township (呈祥乡)
- Jiefu Township (介福乡)
- Waishan Township (外山乡)

== Climate ==
Climate data for Yongchun, elevation 184 m (604 ft), (1991–2020 normals, extremes 1981–present)
Month	Jan	Feb	Mar	Apr	May	Jun	Jul	Aug	Sep	Oct	Nov	Dec	Year
Record high °C (°F)	29.0 (84.2)	32.2 (90.0)	33.2 (91.8)	34.4 (93.9)	38.1 (100.6)	38.0 (100.4)	39.6 (103.3)	39.0 (102.2)	37.1 (98.8)	35.8 (96.4)	34.9 (94.8)	29.6 (85.3)	39.6 (103.3)
Mean daily maximum °C (°F)	18.1 (64.6)	19.0 (66.2)	21.3 (70.3)	25.4 (77.7)	28.5 (83.3)	31.1 (88.0)	33.8 (92.8)	33.3 (91.9)	31.5 (88.7)	28.2 (82.8)	24.4 (75.9)	20.1 (68.2)	26.2 (79.2)
Daily mean °C (°F)	12.5 (54.5)	13.5 (56.3)	15.9 (60.6)	20.1 (68.2)	23.5 (74.3)	26.3 (79.3)	28.2 (82.8)	27.7 (81.9)	26.1 (79.0)	22.5 (72.5)	18.6 (65.5)	14.2 (57.6)	20.8 (69.4)
Mean daily minimum °C (°F)	8.9 (48.0)	10.0 (50.0)	12.4 (54.3)	16.5 (61.7)	20.1 (68.2)	23.2 (73.8)	24.4 (75.9)	24.2 (75.6)	22.4 (72.3)	18.4 (65.1)	14.7 (58.5)	10.3 (50.5)	17.1 (62.8)
Record low °C (°F)	−0.8 (30.6)	−0.7 (30.7)	0.2 (32.4)	6.3 (43.3)	9.3 (48.7)	14.1 (57.4)	20.1 (68.2)	20.4 (68.7)	15.0 (59.0)	6.8 (44.2)	2.4 (36.3)	−3.3 (26.1)	−3.3 (26.1)
Average precipitation mm (inches)	52.1 (2.05)	75.1 (2.96)	130.9 (5.15)	140.9 (5.55)	236.0 (9.29)	287.9 (11.33)	206.9 (8.15)	309.3 (12.18)	185.1 (7.29)	56.9 (2.24)	41.0 (1.61)	40.0 (1.57)	1,762.1 (69.37)
Average precipitation days (≥ 0.1 mm)	8.6	11.6	15.8	14.9	17.9	18.2	13.8	17.8	11.9	5.7	6.4	7.2	149.8
Average snowy days	0.1	0	0	0	0	0	0	0	0	0	0	0	0.1
Average relative humidity (%)	73	76	78	77	80	83	78	80	76	72	72	71	76
Mean monthly sunshine hours	120.2	96.1	100.5	112.3	116.0	124.5	202.6	184.6	168.6	171.7	143.8	141.9	1,682.8
Percentage possible sunshine	36	30	27	29	28	30	48	46	46	48	44	43	38
Source: China Meteorological AdministrationAll-time May high

== See also ==
- John Preston Maxwell
