= Opisthotropis laui =

Scientific classification
- Kingdom: Animalia
- Phylum: Chordata
- Class: Reptilia
- Order: Squamata
- Suborder: Serpentes
- Family: Colubridae
- Genus: Opisthotropis
- Species: O. laui

Binomial name
- Opisthotropis laui Yang, Sung, & Chan, 2013

Species of snake

Opisthotropis laui, Lau's mountain stream snake, is a species of natricine snake found in China.
