= Opisthotropis cucae =

Conservation status
- Data Deficient (IUCN 3.1)

Scientific classification
- Kingdom: Animalia
- Phylum: Chordata
- Class: Reptilia
- Order: Squamata
- Suborder: Serpentes
- Family: Colubridae
- Genus: Opisthotropis
- Species: O. cucae

Binomial name
- Opisthotropis cucae David, Pham, T.Q. Nguyen, & T. Ziegler, 2011

Species of snake

Opisthotropis cucae, Cuc's mountain snake, is a species of natricine snake found in Vietnam.
