= Opisthotropis atra =

Conservation status
- Data Deficient (IUCN 3.1)

Scientific classification
- Kingdom: Animalia
- Phylum: Chordata
- Class: Reptilia
- Order: Squamata
- Suborder: Serpentes
- Family: Colubridae
- Genus: Opisthotropis
- Species: O. atra

Binomial name
- Opisthotropis atra Günther, 1872

Species of snake

Opisthotropis atra is a species of natricine snake.
