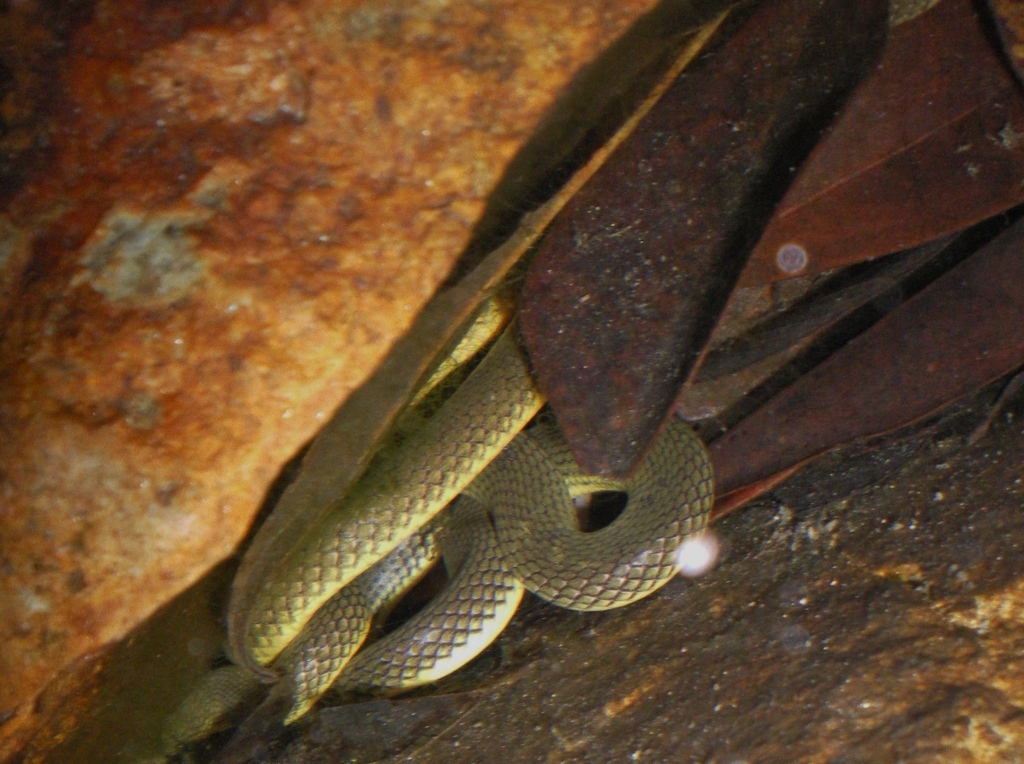

Conservation status
- Near Threatened (IUCN 2.3)

Scientific classification
- Kingdom: Animalia
- Phylum: Chordata
- Class: Reptilia
- Order: Squamata
- Suborder: Serpentes
- Family: Colubridae
- Genus: Opisthotropis
- Species: O. andersonii

Binomial name
- Opisthotropis andersonii (Boulenger, 1888)

Synonyms
- Calamohydrus andersonii Boulenger, 1888; Opisthotropis andersonii — Boulenger, 1891

= Anderson's stream snake =

Species of snake

Anderson's stream snake (Opisthotropis andersonii), also known commonly as Anderson's mountain keelback, is a species of snake in the family Colubridae. The species is native to Asia

== Etymology ==
The specific name, andersonii, is in honor of Scottish herpetologist John Anderson.

== Geographic range ==
O. andersonii is found in Hong Kong and Vietnam.

== Habitat ==
The preferred natural habitats of O. andersonii are forest and freshwater wetlands, at altitudes of 300–900 m (980–2,950 ft).

== Description ==
Dorsally, O. andersonii is blackish olive. Ventrally it is whitish, except for the chin and lower labials which are brown. The snout is short, broad, and depressed. There is a single prefrontal, and only one pair of chin shields.

The dorsal scales, which are arranged in 17 rows throughout the entire length of the body, are smooth on the neck, feebly keeled at midbody, and strongly keeled on the tail. Adults of O. andersonii have a total length (including tail) of 38–46 cm (15–18 in). The tail is 15–20 % of the total length.

== Reproduction ==
O. andersonii is oviparous.
