= Kikuzato's brook snake =

Conservation status
- Critically Endangered (IUCN 3.1)

Scientific classification
- Kingdom: Animalia
- Phylum: Chordata
- Class: Reptilia
- Order: Squamata
- Suborder: Serpentes
- Family: Colubridae
- Genus: Opisthotropis
- Species: O. kikuzatoi

Binomial name
- Opisthotropis kikuzatoi (Okada & Takara, 1958)

Synonyms
- Liopeltis kikuzatoi Okada & Takara, 1958; Opheodrys kikuzatoi — Koba et al., 1959; Opisthotropis kikuzatoi — M. Mori, 1984

Species of snake

Kikuzato's brook snake (Opisthotropis kikuzatoi), also known commonly as Kikuzato's stream snake, is a species of snake in the subfamily Natricinae of the family Colubridae. The species is native to the to Ryukyu Islands of Japan.

== Etymology ==
The specific name, kikuzatoi, is in honor of Kiyotasu Kikuzato, who collected the holotype.

== Geographic range ==
O. kikuzatoi is endemic to Kumejima Island, one of the Okinawa Group islands of Japan.

== Habitat ==
O. kikuzatoi is aquatic, inhabiting flowing streams in the northern and southern hilly regions of the island. Habitats between the two localities have been completely converted to agricultural land.

== Threats ==
This species, O. kikuzatoi, is listed as Critically Endangered by the IUCN under criterion B1ab(iii,v)+2ab(iii,v), due to threats from capturing as bycatch, water pollution, and predation from introduced species, primarily Lithobates catesbeianus, commonly known as the American bullfrog. The American bullfrog was introduced to Kumeijima Island in 1953, and predation may provide great pressure on the population after many decades of population decline. Inbreeding within the small (and isolated) populations is becoming a significant threat also. Specimens have been observed with minor abnormalities (asymmetrical scales on the head) not recorded in the past.

== Diet ==
O. kikuzatoi feeds on earthworms, freshwater shrimp, freshwater fishes, tadpoles, and frogs.

== Reproduction ==
Kikuzato's brook snake is oviparous.
