= Opisthotropis zhaoermii =

Scientific classification
- Kingdom: Animalia
- Phylum: Chordata
- Class: Reptilia
- Order: Squamata
- Suborder: Serpentes
- Family: Colubridae
- Genus: Opisthotropis
- Species: O. zhaoermii

Binomial name
- Opisthotropis zhaoermii Ren, K. Wang, K. Jiang, P. Guo, & Li, 2017

Species of snake

Opisthotropis zhaoermii, Zhao's mountain stream snake, is a species of natricine snake found in China.
