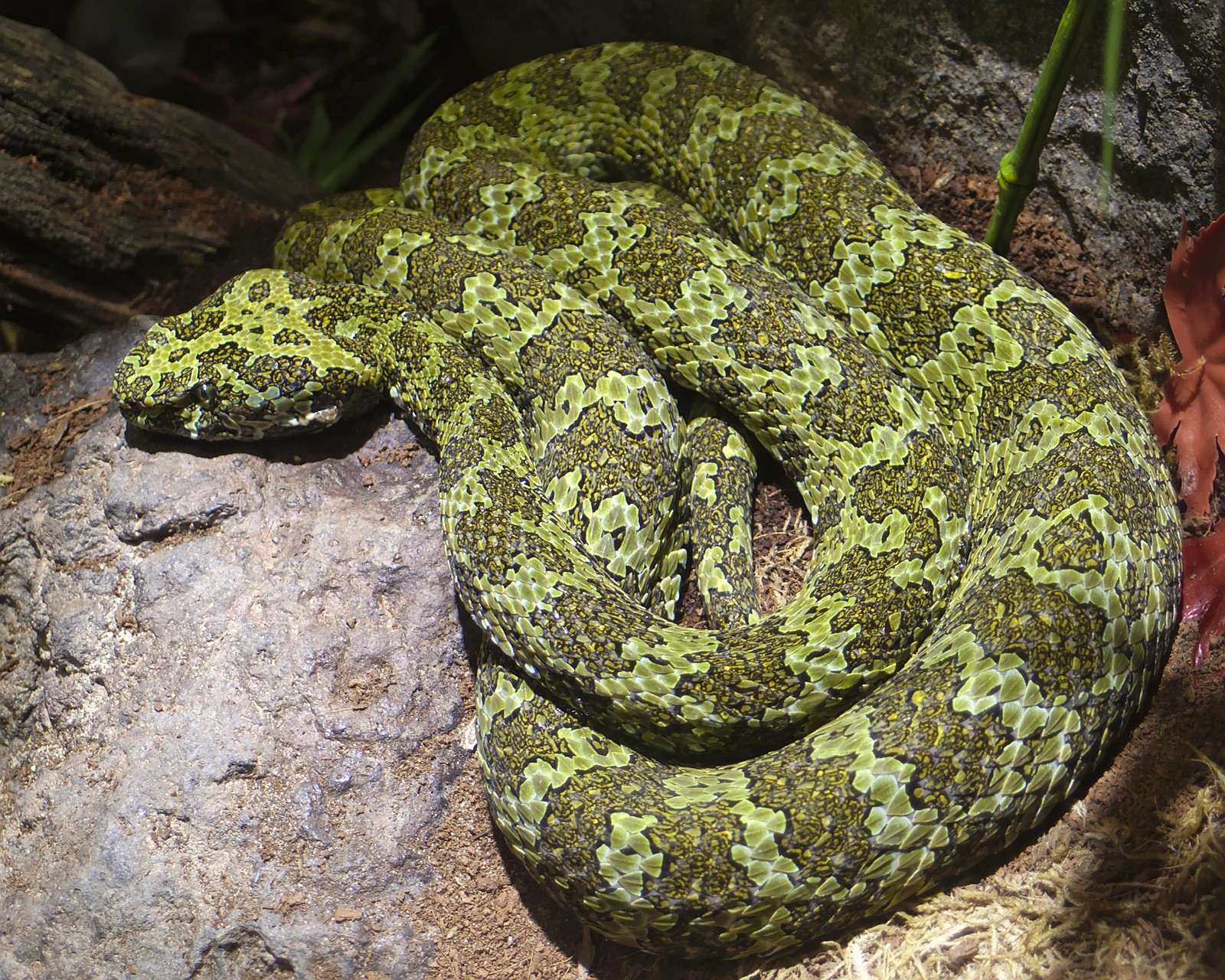

Conservation status
- Endangered (IUCN 3.1)
- CITES Appendix II

Scientific classification
- Kingdom: Animalia
- Phylum: Chordata
- Class: Reptilia
- Order: Squamata
- Suborder: Serpentes
- Family: Viperidae
- Genus: Protobothrops
- Species: P. mangshanensis

Binomial name
- Protobothrops mangshanensis (Zhao, 1990)

Synonyms
- Trimeresurus mangshanensis Zhao In Zhao & Chen, 1990; Ermia mangshanensis — Zhang, 1993; Trimeresurus mangshanensis — McDiarmid, Campbell & Touré, 1999; Zhaoermia mangshanensis — Gumprecht & Tillack, 2004 (nomen novum); Protobothrops mangshanensis — Guo et al., 2007; Protobothrops mangshanensis — Orlov et al., 2009

= Protobothrops mangshanensis =

Species of snake

Protobothrops mangshanensis, commonly known as the Mangshan pit viper, Mt. Mang pit viper, or Mang Mountain pit viper, is a pit viper species endemic to Hunan and Guangdong provinces in China.

== Taxonomy ==
This species was originally described in the genus Trimeresurus. A new genus, Ermia, named in honor of Chinese herpetologist Zhao Ermi, was erected for the species in 1993. However, by coincidence, this generic name was already in use for a genus of locusts. The new generic name Zhaoermia was therefore proposed as a replacement name for Ermia. More recently, Guo et al. (2007) transferred the species to the genus Protobothrops, based on evidence T. mangshanensis is phylogenetically nested within the existing species of that genus. The species is therefore currently known as Protobothrops mangshanensis. No subspecies are currently recognized.

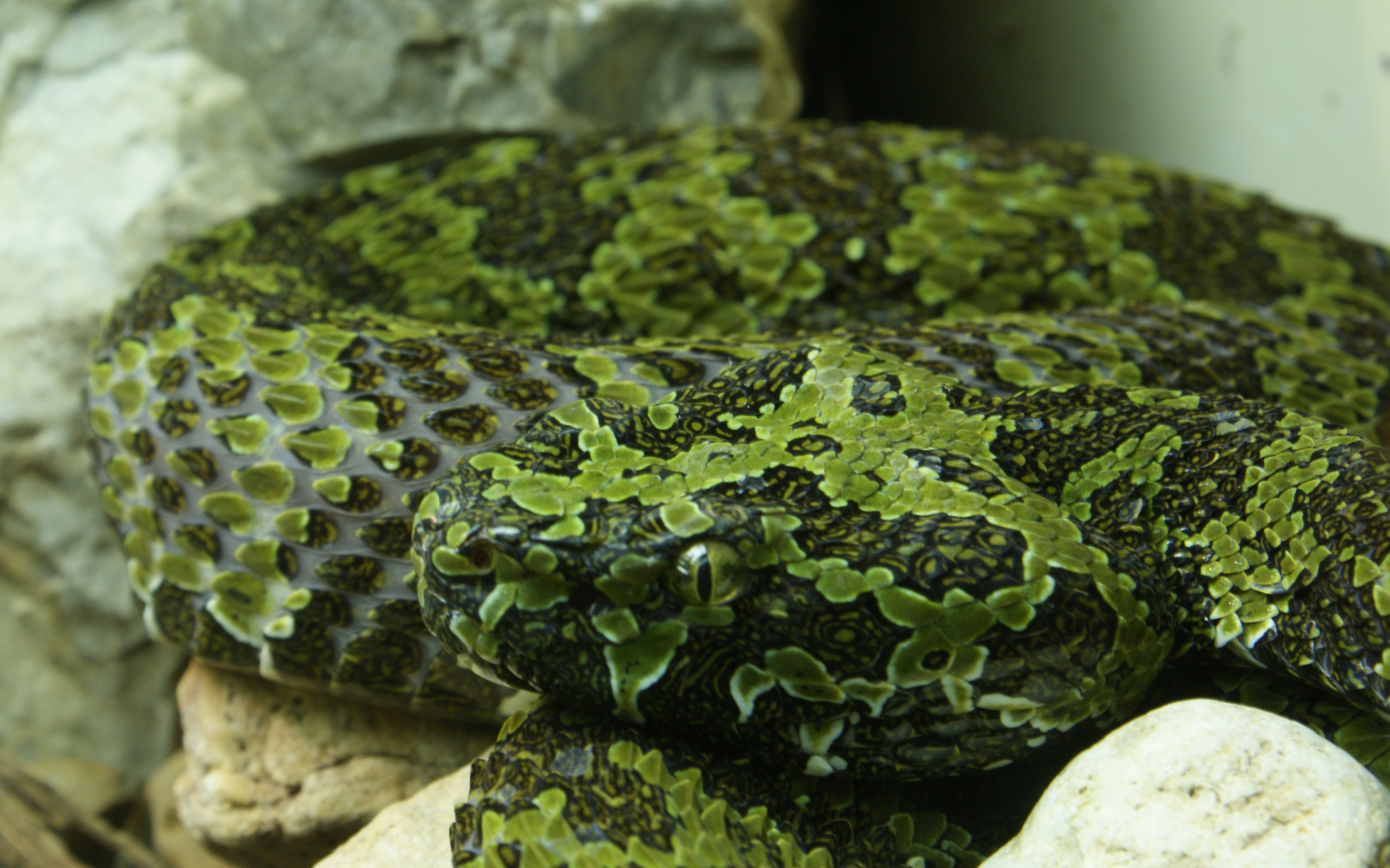
Closeup

== Description ==
This is a nocturnal pit viper that is also known as the ''Mangshan iron-head snake'', ''Chinese pit viper'', and the ''Ironhead viper''. The species reaches an adult weight of 3–5 kilograms (6.6–11.0 lb) and a length of up to 203 centimetres (6.66 ft). They have a white tail tip that they wiggle to mimic a grub so that prey comes into striking range—a behaviour known as caudal luring.

Mangshan vipers eat frogs, birds, insects, and small mammals. The venom causes blood clotting and corrodes muscle tissue, and can be fatal to humans if not treated.

It is sometimes claimed that P. mangshanensis "spits" venom, in a manner similar to spitting cobras

Unusually for vipers, P. mangshanensis is oviparous with the female laying clutches of 13–21 eggs, which she will guard until they hatch.

== Distribution and habitat ==
The species is known from the type locality: "Pingkeng, Mangshan (Mt. Mang), Yizhang County, Hunan", as well as from Ruyuan Yao Autonomous County in Guangdong province, both in southern China. This pitviper is found in mountainous regions in southern Hunan and northern Guangdong at elevations of 800–1,300 m (2,600–4,300 ft) above sea level. Although first discovered in the Mt. Mang mountain range, it is also found in surrounding areas, primarily in subtropical montane forest with thick vegetation and cover. It is often found lying along lichen-covered logs and other structures along animal trails to ambush prey, and can also be found in the numerous limestone caves in the region. Winter temperatures in the region come close to freezing, whilst summer temperatures can reach 30 °C (86 °F) or higher.

== Conservation status ==
This species is listed as "Endangered" by the IUCN on the basis that this species has an extent of occurrence and area of occupancy both unlikely to exceed 300 km^{2} (120 mi^{2}), it is known from two locations at risk from harvesting for the international pet trade and as a local delicacy, and there is a continuing decline in the number of mature individuals.

== See also ==
- List of crotaline species and subspecies
- Snakebite
