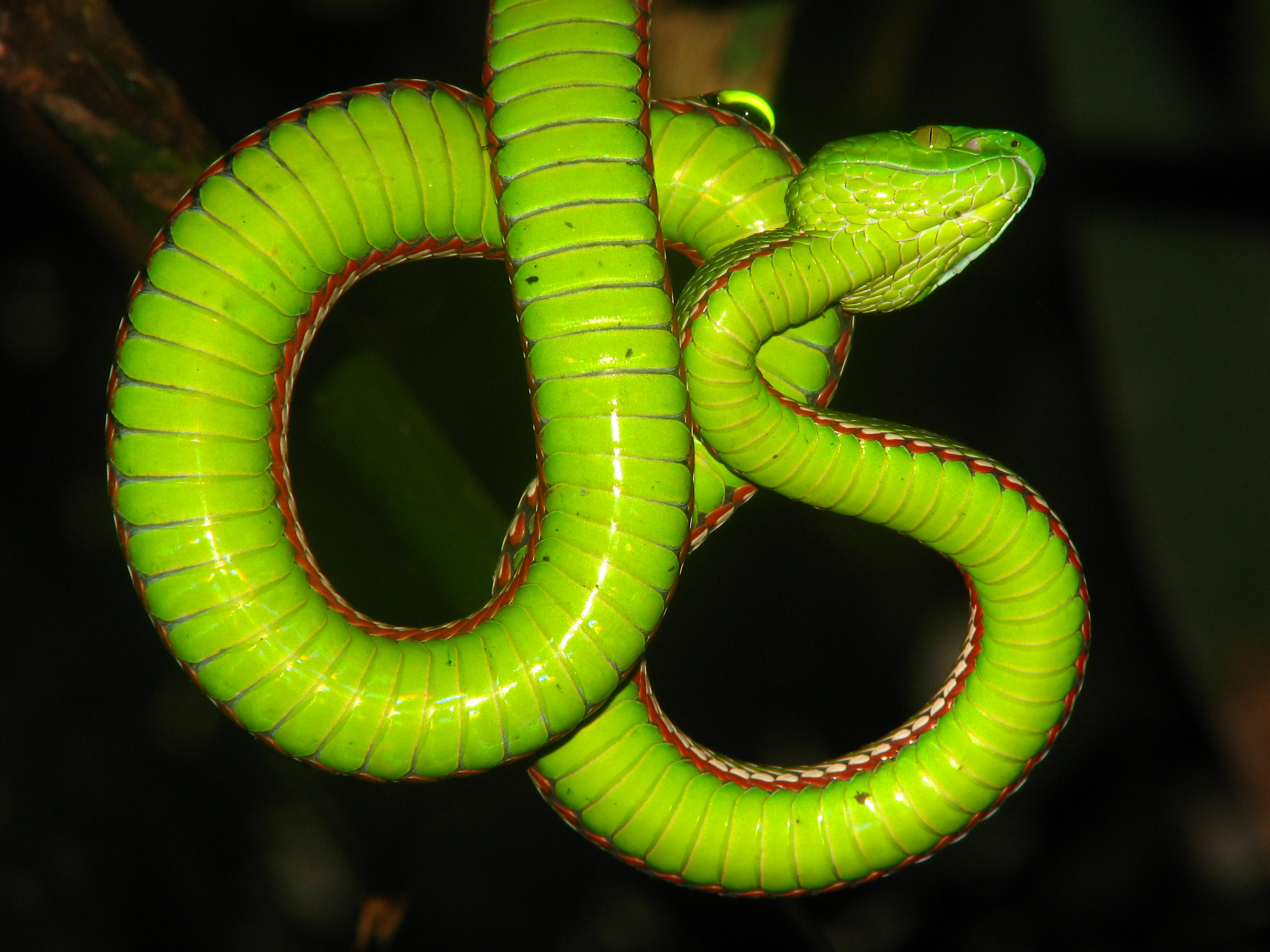

Conservation status
- Data Deficient (IUCN 3.1)

Scientific classification
- Kingdom: Animalia
- Phylum: Chordata
- Class: Reptilia
- Order: Squamata
- Suborder: Serpentes
- Family: Viperidae
- Genus: Trimeresurus
- Species: T. medoensis

Binomial name
- Trimeresurus medoensis Zhao, 1977

Synonyms
- Trimeresurus medoensis Zhao, 1977; Viridovipera medoensis – Malhotra & Thorpe, 2004; Trimeresurus (Viridovipera) medoensis – David et al., 2011

= Trimeresurus medoensis =

Species of snake

Trimeresurus medoensis, commonly named the Motuo bamboo pitviper, is a venomous pitviper species endemic to India, Burma, and Tibet. No subspecies are currently recognized.

== Description ==
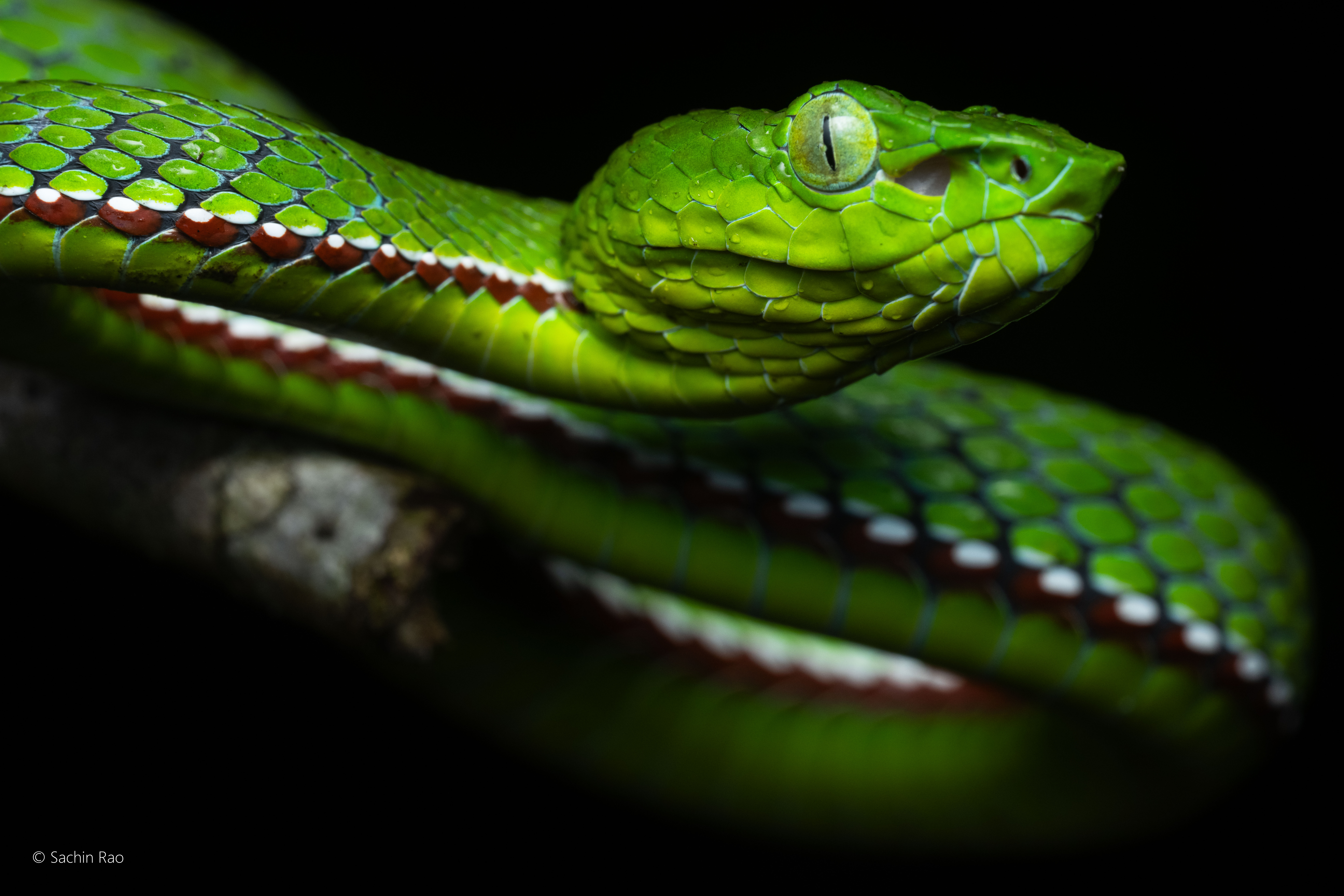
Medo's Pit Viper (Trimeresurus medoensis) in its natural habitat

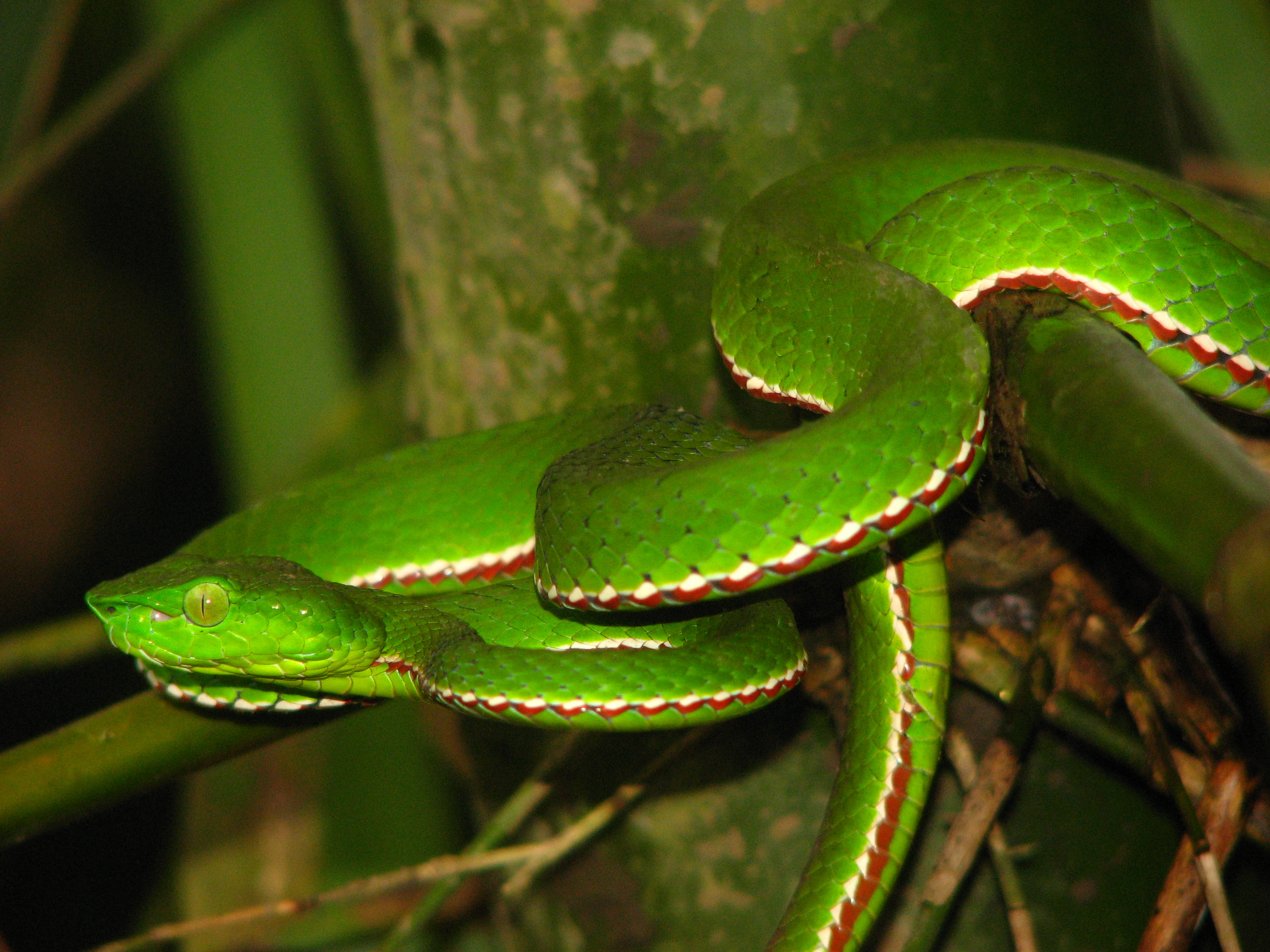
In Arunachal Pradesh, India

Maximum total length for males is 671 mm (26.4 in); for females, 650 mm (26 in). Maximum tail length for males is 125 mm (4.9 in); for females, 115 mm (4.5 in).

The hemipenes are short, thick, and spinose.

Scalation: dorsal scales in 17 longitudinal rows at midbody, of which rows 7-11 are slightly keeled. There are 8 upper labials, of which the first are separated from the nasal scales by a distinct suture. The ventrals number less than 150.

Color pattern: green or bluish green above, yellowish white below, the two separated by a bright bicolored red (below) and white (above) ventrolateral stripe (in both males and females), which occupies the whole of the outermost scale row and a portion of the second row.

== Geographic range ==
Found in North-Eastern India; northern Burma (Myanmar); and southeastern Xizang (Tibet), China. The type locality listed is "near A-ni Bridge, Medo Xian, Xizang [Tibet], alt. 1,200 m [3,900 ft]" [Autonomous Region, China].
