= Opisthotropis guangxiensis =

Conservation status
- Near Threatened (IUCN 3.1)

Scientific classification
- Kingdom: Animalia
- Phylum: Chordata
- Class: Reptilia
- Order: Squamata
- Suborder: Serpentes
- Family: Colubridae
- Genus: Opisthotropis
- Species: O. guangxiensis

Binomial name
- Opisthotropis guangxiensis Zhao, Y.-M. Jiang & Huang, 1978

Species of snake

Opisthotropis guangxiensis, the Guangxi mountain keelback, is a species of natricine snake found in China.
