= Opisthotropis daovantieni =

Conservation status
- Near Threatened (IUCN 3.1)

Scientific classification
- Kingdom: Animalia
- Phylum: Chordata
- Class: Reptilia
- Order: Squamata
- Suborder: Serpentes
- Family: Colubridae
- Genus: Opisthotropis
- Species: O. daovantieni

Binomial name
- Opisthotropis daovantieni Orlov, Darevsky, & Murphy, 1998

Species of snake

Opisthotropis daovantieni, Tien's mountain stream snake, is a species of natricine snake found in Vietnam.
