= Opisthotropis maxwelli =

Conservation status
- Data Deficient (IUCN 3.1)

Scientific classification
- Kingdom: Animalia
- Phylum: Chordata
- Class: Reptilia
- Order: Squamata
- Suborder: Serpentes
- Family: Colubridae
- Genus: Opisthotropis
- Species: O. maxwelli

Binomial name
- Opisthotropis maxwelli Boulenger, 1914

Species of snake

Opisthotropis maxwelli, also known commonly as Maxwell's mountain keelback, is a species of snake in the subfamily Natricinae of the family Colubridae. The species is endemic to China.

== Etymology ==
The specific name, maxwelli, is in honour of British Presbyterian missionary John Preston Maxwell (1871–1961), who also was a physician working in China (1898–1936), and who presented the holotype to the British Museum (Natural History).

== Description ==
Opisthotropis maxwelli may attain a total length (tail included) of 44 cm (17 in). The tail is rather long, comprising 20–23% of the total length. The dorsal scales are keeled, more strongly so on the posterior of the body, and arranged in 17 rows throughout the length of the body. Dorsally, it is dark olive; ventrally, it is yellow.

== Geographic distribution ==
Opisthotropis maxwelli is found in southeastern China, in the provinces of Fujian, Guangdong, and Jiangxi, and the autonomous region of Guangxi.

== Habitat ==
The preferred natural habitat of Opisthotropis maxwelli is streams, at high altitudes.

== Behavior ==
Opisthotropis maxwelli is aquatic and nocturnal. It shelters under rocks.

== Diet ==
Opisthotropis maxwelli preys predominately upon aquatic segmented worms, and also freshwater shrimp, fishes, frogs and their tadpoles.

== Reproduction ==
Opisthotropis maxwelli is oviparous.
