= Opisthotropis shenzhenensis =

Scientific classification
- Kingdom: Animalia
- Phylum: Chordata
- Class: Reptilia
- Order: Squamata
- Suborder: Serpentes
- Family: Colubridae
- Genus: Opisthotropis
- Species: O. shenzhenensis

Binomial name
- Opisthotropis shenzhenensis Y.-Y. Wang, Q. Guo, Liu, Lyu, J. Wang, Luo, Sun & Zhang, 2017

Species of snake

Opisthotropis shenzhenensis, the Shenzhen mountain stream snake, is a species of natricine snake found in China.
