= Cyrtodactylus zhaoermii =

Conservation status
- Least Concern (IUCN 3.1)

Scientific classification
- Kingdom: Animalia
- Phylum: Chordata
- Class: Reptilia
- Order: Squamata
- Suborder: Gekkota
- Family: Gekkonidae
- Genus: Cyrtodactylus
- Species: C. zhaoermii

Binomial name
- Cyrtodactylus zhaoermii Shi & H. Zhao, 2010

Species of lizard

Cyrtodactylus zhaoermii is a species of gecko, a lizard in the family Gekkonidae. The species is endemic to the Tibet Autonomous Region of China.

== Etymology ==
The specific name, zhaoermii, is in honor of Chinese herpetologist Zhao Er-Mi.

== Habitat ==
The preferred natural habitats of C. zhaoermii are shrubland and rocky areas, at altitudes of 3,500–4,000 m (11,500–13,100 ft).

== Reproduction ==
The mode of reproduction of C. zhaoermii is unknown.
