= Opisthotropis durandi =

Scientific classification
- Kingdom: Animalia
- Phylum: Chordata
- Class: Reptilia
- Order: Squamata
- Suborder: Serpentes
- Family: Colubridae
- Genus: Opisthotropis
- Species: O. durandi

Binomial name
- Opisthotropis durandi Teynié, Lottier, David, T.Q. Nguyen, & G. Vogel, 2014

Species of snake

Opisthotropis durandi, Durand's mountain stream snake, is a species of natricine snake found in Laos.
