= Smith's mountain keelback =

Conservation status
- Data Deficient (IUCN 3.1)

Scientific classification
- Kingdom: Animalia
- Phylum: Chordata
- Class: Reptilia
- Order: Squamata
- Suborder: Serpentes
- Family: Colubridae
- Genus: Opisthotropis
- Species: O. spenceri

Binomial name
- Opisthotropis spenceri M.A. Smith, 1918

Species of snake

Smith's mountain keelback (Opisthotropis spenceri), also known commonly as Spencer's stream snake, is a species of snake in the family Colubridae. The species is endemic to Thailand.

== Etymology ==
The specific name, spenceri, is in honor of Mr. F.D. Spencer who collected the type specimen.

== Habitat ==
The preferred natural habitat of O. spenceri is flowing streams.

== Description ==
O. spenceri may attain a total length (including tail) of 60 cm (24 in). Dorsally, it is olive-colored. Ventrally it is yellowish white on the body, with gray mottling on the tail. It has smooth dorsal scales, which are arranged in 17 rows.

== Behavior ==
O. spenceri is aquatic and nocturnal.

== Diet ==
O. spenceri preys upon freshwater shrimp, earthworms, fishes, frogs, and tadpoles.

== Reproduction ==
O. spenceri is oviparous.
