= Opisthotropis voquyi =

Scientific classification
- Kingdom: Animalia
- Phylum: Chordata
- Class: Reptilia
- Order: Squamata
- Suborder: Serpentes
- Family: Colubridae
- Genus: Opisthotropis
- Species: O. voquyi

Binomial name
- Opisthotropis voquyi T. Ziegler, David, T.N. Ziegler, Pham, T.Q. Nguyen & Le, 2018

Species of snake

Opisthotropis voquyi, Vo Quy's mountain stream keelback, is a species of natricine snake found in Vietnam.
