= Zhao Ermi =

Chinese herpetologist

Zhao Ermi (Chinese: 赵尔宓; 1930 – 24 December 2016) was a Chinese herpetologist, born in Chengdu. His ancestors were Manchu Bannermen of Irgen Gioro clan who were stationed in Chengdu during the Qing dynasty. He studied biology at West China Union University, under the tutelage of Liu Chengzhao. He was elected a member of the Chinese Academy of Sciences in 2001. He died at West China Medical Center of Sichuan University on 24 December 2016.

== Taxa named after him ==
Zhao is commemorated in the scientific names of four taxa of reptiles.

- Zhaoermia Gumprecht & Tillack, 2004, a genus of pitviper (synonym of Protobothrops)
- Cyrtodactylus zhaoermii Shi & H. Zhao, 2010, a species of gecko
- Diploderma zhaoermii Gao & Hou, 2002, a species of lizard
- Thermophis zhaoermii Guo, Liu, Feng & He, 2008, a species of snake

Also, two amphibian species have been named after him.

- Paramesotriton ermizhaoi Wu, Rovito, Papenfuss & Hanken, 2009, a species of newt (synonym of Paramesotriton labiatus)
- Onychodactylus zhaoermii Che, Poyarkov & Yan, 2012, a species of salamander

== Described taxa ==
- Achalinus meiguensis Hu & Zhao, 1966
- Amolops liangshanensis (Wu & Zhao, 1984)
- Amphiesma optatum (Hu & Zhao, 1966)
- Calotes medogensis Zhao & S. Li, 1984
- Cuora zhoui Zhao, Zhou & Ye, 1990
- Cyrtopodion medogense (Zhao & S. Li, 1987)
- Dinodon rosozonatum Hu & Zhao, 1972
- Gloydius shedaoensis Zhao, 1979
- Hebius metusia Inger, Zhao, Shaffer & Wu, 1990
- Ingerana reticulata (Zhao & S. Li, 1984)
- Kurixalus hainanus (Zhao, Wang & Shi, 2005) (synonym of Kurixalus bisacculus)
- Laudakia papenfussi Zhao, 1998
- Laudakia wui Zhao, 1998
- Liua Zhao & Hu, 1983
- Liuixalus J. Li, Che, Bain, Zhao & Zhang, 2008
- Oligodon multizonatus Zhao & Jiang, 1981
- Opisthotropis cheni Zhao, 1999
- Opisthotropis guangxiensis Zhao, Jiang & Huang, 1978
- Oreolalax multipunctatus Wu, Zhao, Inger & Shaffer, 1993
- Pelophylax tenggerensis (Zhao, Macey & Papenfuss, 1988)
- Phrynocephalus albolineatus Zhao, 1979
- Plagiopholis unipostocularis Zhao, Jiang & Huang, 1978
- Plestiodon liui (Hikida & Zhao, 1989)
- Protobothrops xiangchengensis (Zhao, Jiang & Huang, 1979)
- Rana zhengi Zhao, 1999
- Rhabdophis adleri Zhao, 1997
- Scincella huanrenensis Zhao & Huang, 1982
- Scincella tsinlingensis (Hu & Zhao, 1966)
- Viridovipera medoensis (Zhao, 1977)
- Xenopeltis hainanensis Hu & Zhao in Zhao, 1972
- Protobothrops mangshanensis (Zhao, 1990)
