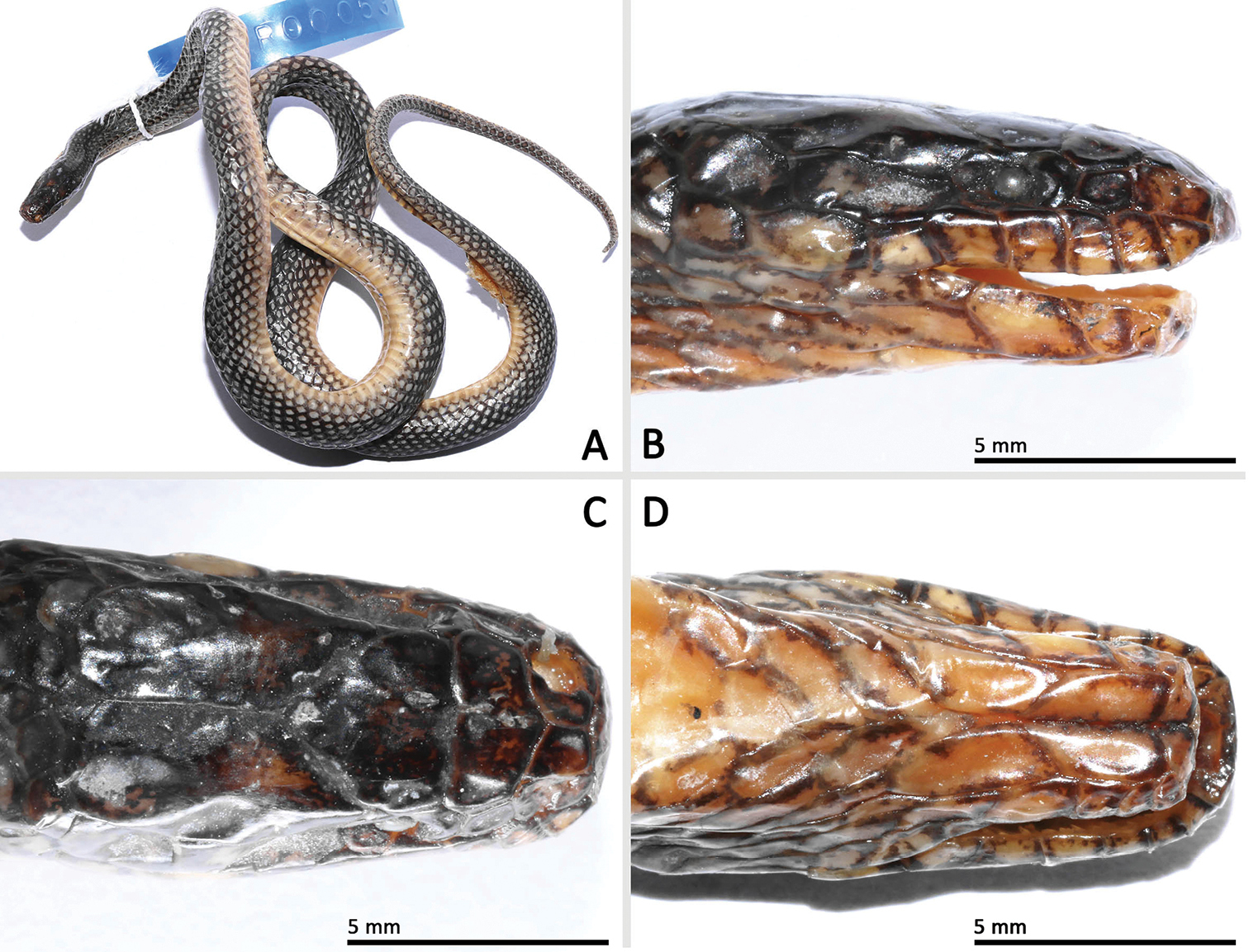

Scientific classification
- Kingdom: Animalia
- Phylum: Chordata
- Class: Reptilia
- Order: Squamata
- Suborder: Serpentes
- Family: Colubridae
- Genus: Opisthotropis
- Species: O. haihaensis

Binomial name
- Opisthotropis haihaensis Ziegler, Pham, T.V. Nguyen, T.Q. Nguyen, J. Wang, Y.-Y. Wang, Stuart, & Le, 2019

= Opisthotropis haihaensis =

Species of snake

Opisthotropis haihaensis, the Hai Ha mountain stream keelback, is a species of natricine snake found in China and Vietnam.
