= Opisthotropis jacobi =

Conservation status
- Data Deficient (IUCN 3.1)

Scientific classification
- Kingdom: Animalia
- Phylum: Chordata
- Class: Reptilia
- Order: Squamata
- Suborder: Serpentes
- Family: Colubridae
- Genus: Opisthotropis
- Species: O. jacobi

Binomial name
- Opisthotropis jacobi Angel & Bourret, 1933

Species of snake

Opisthotropis jacobi, also known commonly as the Chapa mountain keelback, Jacob's mountain stream keelback, and Jacob's stream snake, is a species of snake in the subfamily Natricinae of the family Colubridae. The species is native to Vietnam and China.

== Etymology ==
The specific name, jacobi, is in honor of German entomologist Arnold F. V. Jacobi.

== Geographic range ==
O. jacobi is found in extreme northern Vietnam and in adjacent Yunnan Province, China.

== Habitat ==
The preferred natural habitats of O. jacobi are forest and streams, at altitudes of 500–1,500 m (1,600–4,900 ft).

== Description ==
O. jacobi may attain a total length (including tail) of 54 cm (21 in). Dorsally, it is uniformly shiny black. Ventrally, it is also shiny black but with light-edged ventrals and subcaudals. The dorsal scales are smooth, and arranged in 15 rows throughout the length of the body.

== Diet ==
O. jacobi preys upon earthworms, freshwater shrimp, fishes, and frogs and their tadpoles.

== Reproduction ==
O. jacobi is oviparous.
