= John Preston Maxwell =

John Preston Maxwell (5 December 1871 – 25 July 1961), son of James Laidlaw Maxwell, was a Presbyterian obstetric missionary to China.

John Preston Maxwell was born on 5 December 1871 in Birmingham, where his father Dr James Laidlaw Maxwell, practised medicine. He attended University College School and University College London, before taking his clinical training at St Bartholomew's Hospital, from which he emerged with a gold medal in obstetrics and went on to work as a resident at St Bartholomew's. Then, following his devout Presbyterian faith, Maxwell became a Medical missionary for the English Presbyterian Church and, in about 1898, went to Fujian in China, where he spent the majority of his professional life. He worked at Yungchun Hospital, Fujian, from 1899 to 1919, and Changpoo, Amoy.

He specialised in obstetrics and was a leading authority on foetal osteomalacia. He became a Director of the Department of Obstetrics and Gynaecology at the Union Medical College in Beijing (a teaching hospital funded by the Rockefeller Foundation), President of the Chinese Society of Obstetrics and Gynaecology and worked as secretary to the medical committee of the Lord Mayor's Fund for the Relief of Distress in China. He was awarded the Army and Navy Medal by the Chinese Republic and was made a Fellow of the Royal College of Obstetricians and Gynaecologists in 1929. Maxwell returned to England at some point after 1935 (possibly as a result of the invasion of Beijing by the Japanese in 1937) and lived at Brinkley, Cambridgeshire. He was elected consultant obstetrician and gynaecologist at the nearby Newmarket General Hospital. He married Edith Lilly Isaacson in 1899 (who, as a proficient artist, illustrated some of her husband's research papers) and they had one daughter, Marjorie Gordon Maxwell (later Steen), born in 1908. John Maxwell died suddenly near his home on 25 July 1961, at the age of 89, his wife having predeceased him on 14 October 1954.

A species of Chinese snake, Opisthotropis maxwelli, is named in his honour.

== Archives ==
Papers of John Preston Maxwell are held at the Cadbury Research Library (University of Birmingham) along with papers of his father, James Laidlaw Maxwell.
