= John Anderson (zoologist) =

Scottish anatomist and zoologist (1833–1900)

John Anderson FRS
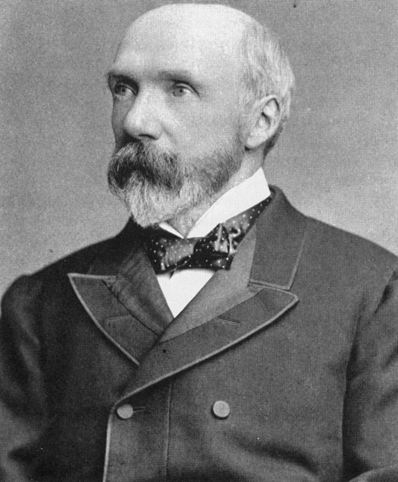
- Portrait of John Anderson, 1894
- Born: 4 October 1833; Edinburgh, Scotland
- Died: 4 August 1900 (aged 66); Buxton, England
- Resting place: Dean Cemetery, Edinburgh
- Education: University of Edinburgh
- Known for: Zoology of Egypt
- Spouse: Grace Scott Thoms
- Awards: Fellow of the Royal Society
- Scientific career
- Fields: Zoology and anatomy
- Workplaces: Royal Physical Society; Free Church College; Indian Museum; Medical College & Hospital

John Anderson FRSE FRS FRGS FZS FLS FRPSE FSA (4 October 1833 – 15 August 1900) was a Scottish anatomist and zoologist who worked in India as the curator of the Indian Museum, Calcutta.

== Early life ==
Anderson was born in Edinburgh, the second son of Thomas Anderson, who worked in the National Bank of Scotland, and his wife Jane Cleghorn. He took an interest in natural history at an early age as did his brother Thomas Anderson, who worked at the Royal Botanic Garden in Calcutta from 1861 to 1863. He went to school at George Square Academy and Hill Street Institution before joining work at the Bank of Scotland.

He left the bank to study medicine, and graduated from the University of Edinburgh in 1861. He studied anatomy under John Goodsir and received his MD in 1862 with a gold medal for his thesis in zoology. He was also associated with the founding of the Royal Physical Society which grew out of the Wernerian Society over which he presided. He was appointed to the chair of natural history in the Free Church College in Edinburgh and worked there for the next two years. During this period he studied marine organisms based on dredging off the coast of Scotland, and published notes in the Annals and Magazine of Natural History. He married Grace Scott Thoms, daughter of Patrick Hunter Thoms of Aberlemno, Forfar.

== India ==
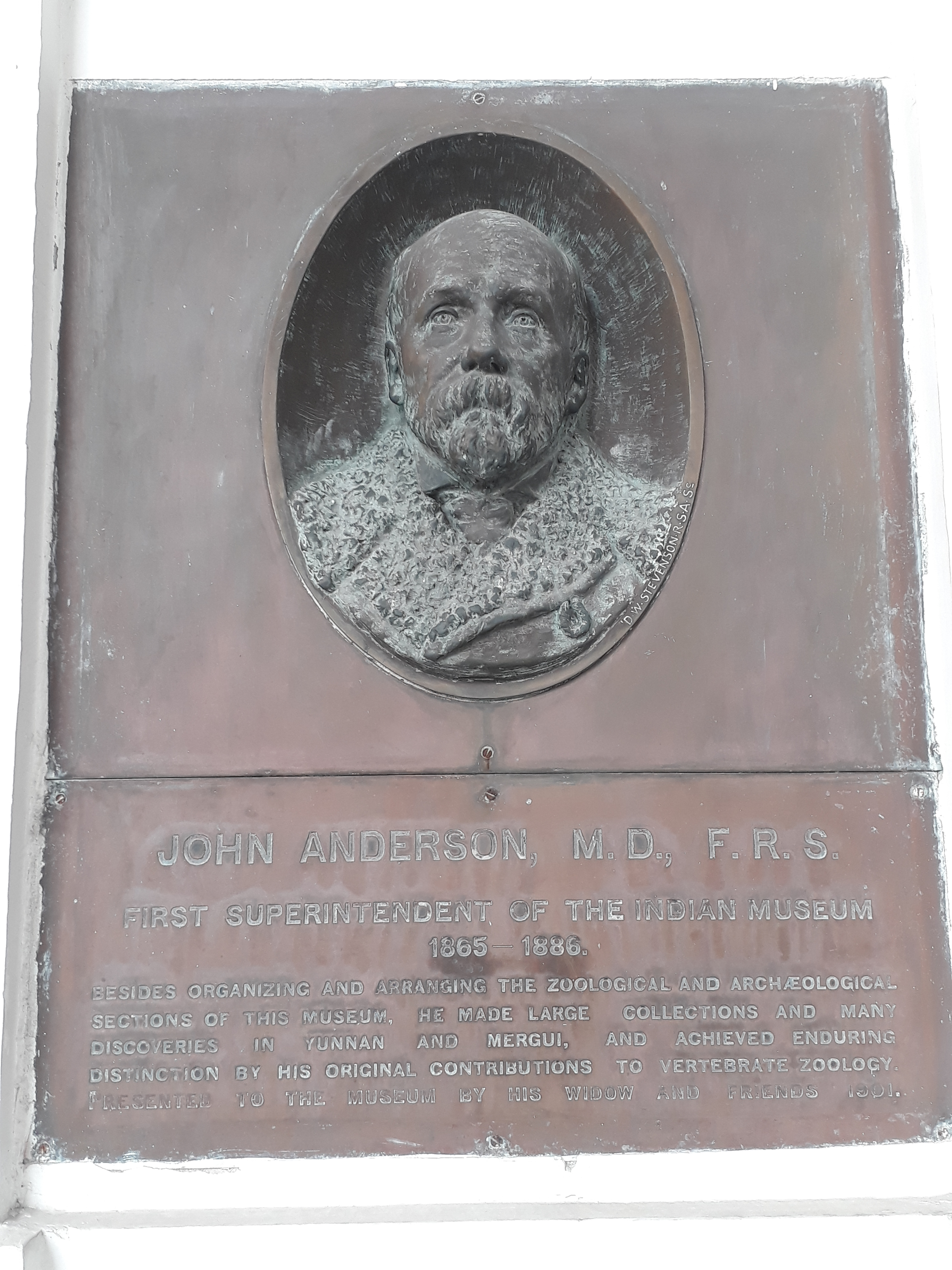
Anderson memorial in Indian Museum, Kolkata

Anderson moved to India in 1864 to take up the position as the first curator of the Indian Museum at Calcutta in 1865. He catalogued the mammal and archaeological collections. He held the position of curator until 1887, when he was succeeded by James Wood-Mason and made superintendent of the museum. He made several collection expeditions to China and Burma. In 1867 he accompanied Colonel Edward Bosc Sladen as a naturalist on an expedition to Upper Burma and Yunnan. This expedition allowed him to collect the Irrawaddy dolphin, Orcaella brevirostris and compared with Orcaella fluminalis and the Gangetic dolphin, Plantanista gangetica. In 1875–6, he travelled to the same area under Colonel Horace Browne. This was cut short due to the murder of the consular officer Augustus Raymond Margary. Anderson made a third expedition for the Indian Museum in 1881–2 to the Mergui archipelago, Burma.

Anderson made comparative studies of anatomy of the species that he collected. He worked on reptiles, birds as well as mammals such as of the genus Hylomys. He also wrote on the ethnology of the Selungs of the Mergui archipelago. Many of the plant specimens that he collected are at Calcutta, Kew and the Natural History Museum, London. He was elected a fellow of the Royal Society in 1879 and was made honorary LLD of the University of Edinburgh in 1885. During the time that he held the office of superintendent of the Calcutta museum he also served as professor of comparative anatomy at the medical school in Calcutta. He and his wife Grace travelled to Japan in 1884, forming an extensive collection of Ainu artefacts, which was donated to the British Museum and the National Museum of Scotland.

== Return to Britain ==
He retired from service in India in 1886 just a few years after his marriage. He later made extensive zoological collections in Egypt, forming the basis of his Zoology of Egypt. He died in Buxton, England and was survived by his wife Grace Scott Thoms. They are buried together on the south side of Dean Cemetery in Edinburgh. The portrait head was sculpted by David Watson Stevenson.

== Taxa named in his honor ==
- Sacculina andersonii (Giard, 1887), a parasitic barnacle, a synonym of Sacculina carcini (Thompson, 1836)
- Opisthotropis andersonii (Boulenger, 1888), a snake
- Trimeresurus andersonii (Theobald, 1868), a venomous snake
- Glaridoglanis andersonii (F. Day, 1870), a catfish that inhabits the Irrawaddy drainage, Myanmar and China. It has also been recorded from the Brahmaputra drainage in China.
- Japalura andersoniana (Annandale, 1905), a lizard
- Calamaria andersoni (Yang & Zheng, 2018), a snake

== Bibliography ==
Among the printed publications of John Anderson are:

- Anderson, John (1881). Catalogue of Mammalia in the Indian Museum, Calcutta, Part I (Calcutta).
- Anderson, John (1883). Catalogue and Handbook of the Archaeological Collections in the Indian Museum, Part I: Asoka and Indo-Scythian Galleries. Part II: Gupta and Inscription Galleries. Buddhist, Jain, Brahmanical, and Muhammadan Sculptures; Metal Weapons, objects from Tumuli, &c. Printed by order of the Trustees, Calcutta.
- Anderson, Grace Scott; Anderson, John (1884). Japan from India: letters & notes of the journey of two travellers, chiefly by one of them. Calcutta?: Privately printed. 287 pp.
- Anderson, John (1896). A Contribution to the Herpetology of Arabia, with a preliminary list of the reptiles and batrachians of Egypt. London: R.H. Porter. 124 pp.
- Anderson, John (1898). Zoology of Egypt: Volume First, Reptilia and Batrachia. London: Bernard Quaritch. 571 pp.
- Anderson, John (1902). Zoology of Egypt: Mammalia. London: Hugh Rees Limited. 551 pp.

== See also ==
- Category:Taxa named by John Anderson (zoologist)

== Sources ==
- Bedddard, Frank Evers (1901). "Anderson, John" . In Lee, Sidney (ed.). Dictionary of National Biography (1st supplement). Vol. I. London: Smith, Elder & Co.
- 'Obituary', in: Ibis, series 8 vol 1, no. 1 (January 1901), p. 159.
