= Opisthotropis maculosa =

Conservation status
- Data Deficient (IUCN 3.1)

Scientific classification
- Kingdom: Animalia
- Phylum: Chordata
- Class: Reptilia
- Order: Squamata
- Suborder: Serpentes
- Family: Colubridae
- Genus: Opisthotropis
- Species: O. maculosa

Binomial name
- Opisthotropis maculosa Stuart & Chuaynkern, 2007

Species of snake

Opisthotropis maculosa, the yellow-spotted mountain stream snake or yellow-spotted mountain keelback, is a species of natricine snake found in Thailand.
