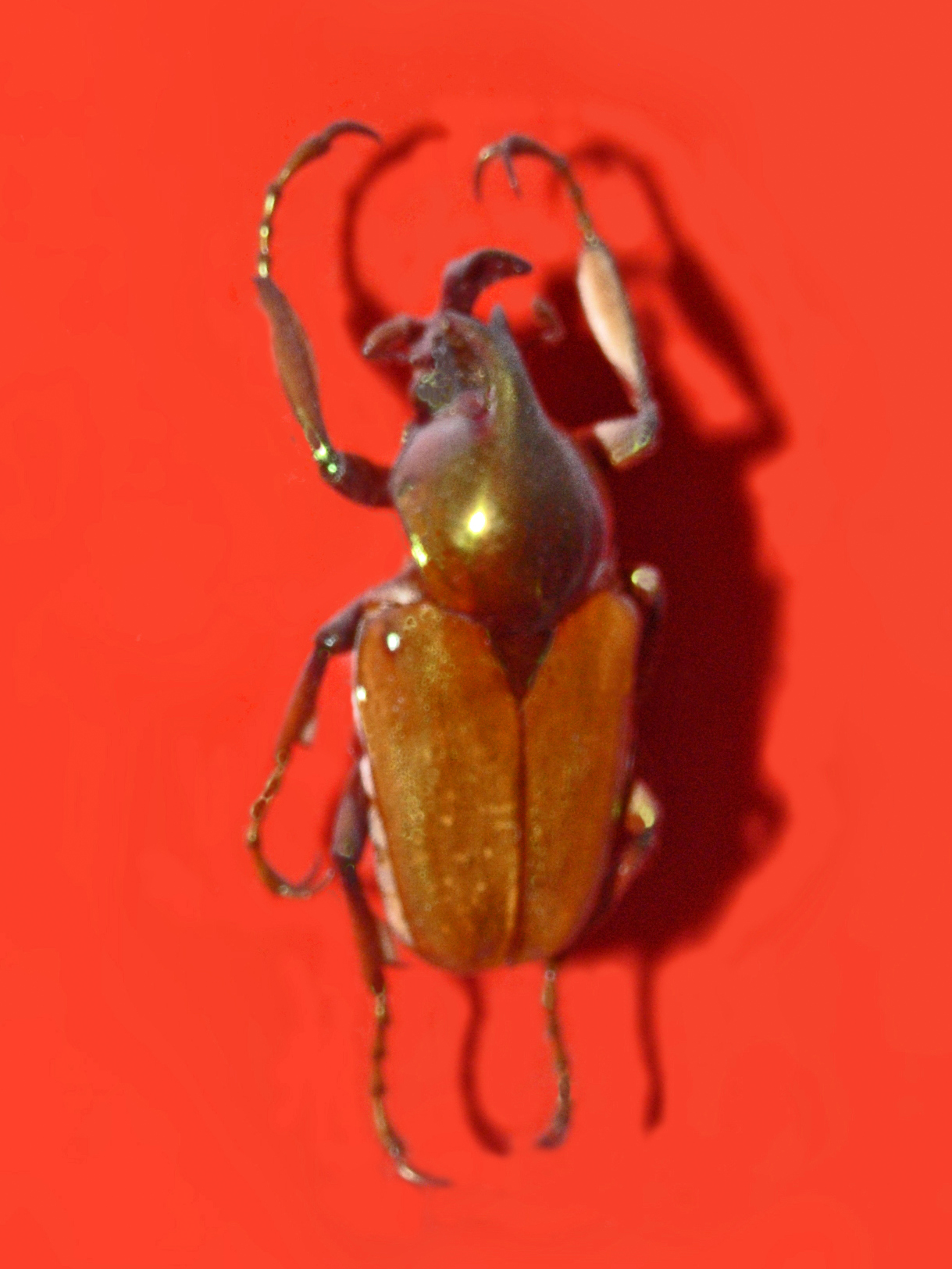
- Mounted specimen of Phaedimus cumingi

Scientific classification
- Kingdom: Animalia
- Phylum: Arthropoda
- Class: Insecta
- Order: Coleoptera
- Suborder: Polyphaga
- Infraorder: Scarabaeiformia
- Family: Scarabaeidae
- Genus: Phaedimus
- Species: P. cumingi

Binomial name
- Phaedimus cumingi (Waterhouse, 1841)

= Phaedimus cumingi =

Species of beetle

Phaedimus cumingi is a beetle species belonging to the family Scarabaeidae, subfamily Cetoniinae.

== Description ==
Phaedimus cumingi can reach a length of about 20–23 millimetres (0.79–0.91 in). Pronotum and legs are metallic green, while elytra are yellowish.

== Distribution ==
This beetle is present in Philippines.

== Etymology ==
Named to honour the collector Hugh Cuming.
