= Ramphotyphlops =

Scientific classification
- Kingdom: Animalia
- Phylum: Chordata
- Class: Reptilia
- Order: Squamata
- Suborder: Serpentes
- Family: Typhlopidae
- Genus: Ramphotyphlops; Fitzinger, 1843

Synonyms
- Typhlina Wagler, 1830; Ramphotyphlops Fitzinger, 1843; Pseudotyphlops Fitzinger, 1843; Pilidion A.M.C. Duméril & Bibron, 1844; Typhlinalis Gray, 1845; Typhlira Jan, 1861

Genus of snakes

Common names: long-tailed blindsnakes, long-tailed blind snakes, worm snakes.

Ramphotyphlops is a genus of nonvenomous blind snakes of the family Typhlopidae. Member species of the genus are native to southern Asia and southeast Asia, as well as many islands in the southern Pacific Ocean. They occur in a wide variety of habitats. As of 2025, 23 species are recognized as being valid.

== Description and ecology ==
Growing to 50–750 mm (2–30 in) in length, snakes of the genus Ramphotyphlops occur in a variety of colors from light beige, to red, to blackish brown. They are often difficult to identify properly without the aid of optical magnification. Their heads are conical and tapered into their bodies.

These snakes can be found in ant and termite nests, as well as under fallen leaves and in holes in logs. They are believed to feed on earthworms, as well as the larvae and eggs of ants and termites. They are thought to be oviparous, although this has only been observed in a few species.

== Species ==
Species	Taxon author *	Subsp.**	Common name	Geographic range
R. acuticauda	(W. Peters, 1877)	0	Palau Island blind snake	Palau, Micronesia
R. adocetus	Wynn, Reynolds, Buden, Falanruw & Lynch, 2012	0		Caroline Islands, Micronesia
R. angusticeps	(W. Peters, 1877)	0	arboreal blind snake	Solomon Islands
R. becki	(W. Tanner, 1948)	0	Beck's blind snake	Guadalcanal, Solomon Islands
R. bipartitus	(Sauvage, 1879)	0	Southern New Guinea blind snake	Tidore, Maluku Islands
R. conradi	(W. Peters, 1875)	0	Conrad's worm snake	Sulawesi, Indonesia
R. cumingii	(Gray, 1845)	0	Cuming's blind snake	Philippines
R. depressus	(W. Peters, 1880)	0	Melanesia blind snake	sw Pacific: Maluku; New Guinea; Bismarcks; Solomons; Fiji
R. erebus	Kraus, 2023	0		Papua New Guinea
R. exocoeti	(Boulenger, 1887)	0	Christmas Island blind snake	Christmas Island (Australia)
R. flaviventer	(W. Peters, 1864)	0	yellow-bellied blind snake	Maluku; New Guinea; Fiji
R. hatmaliyeb	Wynn, Reynolds, Buden, Falanruw, & Lynch, 2012	0		Caroline Islands, Micronesia
R. lineatus	(Schlegel, 1839)	0	striped blind snake, striped worm snake, lined blind snake	Singapore
R. lorenzi	(F. Werner, 1909)	0	Lorenz's blind snake	Borneo
R. mansuetus	(Barbour, 1921)	0	small-headed blind snake	Solomon Islands
R. marxi	(Wallach, 1993)	0	Marx's worm snake	Philippines
R.mollyozakiae	(Wallach, 2020)	0	Molly Ozaki’s blind snake	Thailand
R. multilineatus^{T}	(Schlegel, 1839)	0	hook-nosed blind snake	Kai Islands and Salawati, Indonesia
R. olivaceus	(Gray, 1845)	0	olive blind snake	Borneo; Philippines; Sulawesi; Maluku; Solomon Islands
R. similis	(Brongersma, 1934)	0	Manukwari blind snake	New Guinea
R. suluensis	(Taylor, 1918)	0		Sulu Archipelago, Philippines
R. supranasalis	(Brongersma, 1934)	0	Salawati blind snake	Salawati Island, Indonesia
R. willeyi	(Boulenger, 1900)	0	Loyalty Islands blind snake	Loyalty Islands, New Caledonia

*) A taxon author in parentheses indicates that the species was originally described in a genus other than Ramphotyphlops.
**) Not including the nominate subspecies.
^{T}) Type species.
