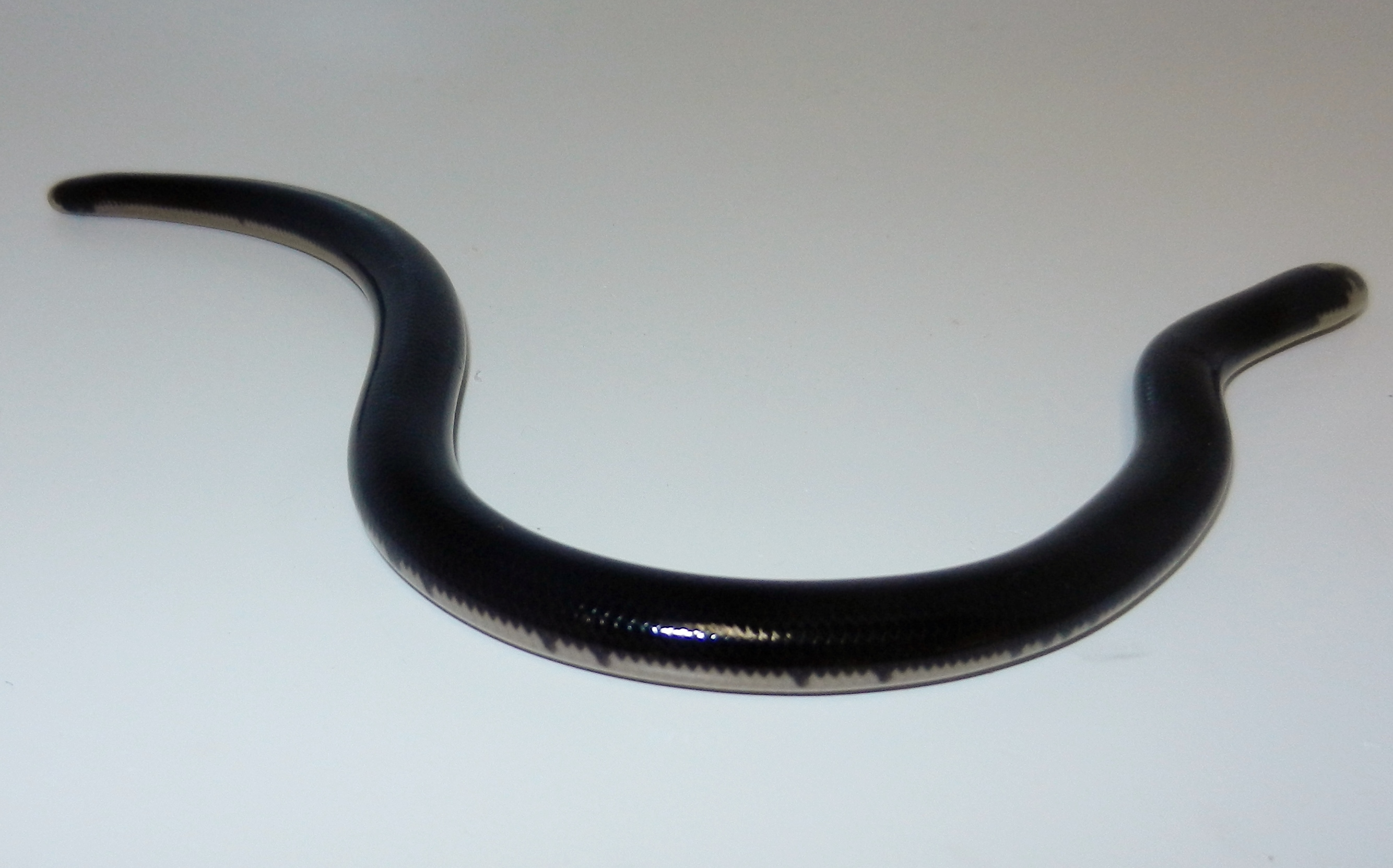
- Amerotyphlops reticulatus, reticulate worm snake

Scientific classification
- Kingdom: Animalia
- Phylum: Chordata
- Class: Reptilia
- Order: Squamata
- Suborder: Serpentes
- Family: Typhlopidae
- Genus: Amerotyphlops; Hedges, Marion, Lipp, Marin & Vidal, 2014

= Amerotyphlops =

Genus of snakes

Amerotyphlops is a genus of snakes in the family Typhlopidae.

== Distribution ==
The 19 species of this genus are found from Mexico through South America.

== Species ==
The following species are recognized as being valid.

- Amerotyphlops amoipira (Rodrigues & Juncá, 2002)
- Amerotyphlops arenensis Graboski, Pereira Filho, Silva, Prudente & Zaher, 2015
- Amerotyphlops brongersmianus (Vanzolini, 1976)
- Amerotyphlops caetanoi Graboski, Arredondo, Grazziotin, Guerra-Fuentes, Pereira Filho, Silva, Prudente, Pinto, Rodrigues, Bonatto & Zaher 2022
- Amerotyphlops costaricensis (Jiménez & Savage, 1963)
- Amerotyphlops illusorium Graboski, Arredondo, Grazziotin, Guerra-Fuentes, Pereira Filho, Silva, Prudente, Pinto, Rodrigues, Bonatto & Zaher, 2022
- Amerotyphlops lehneri (Roux, 1926)
- Amerotyphlops martis Graboski, Arredondo, Grazziotin, Guerra-Fuentes, Pereira Filho, Silva, Prudente, Pinto, Rodrigues, Bonatto & Zaher, 2022
- Amerotyphlops microstomus (Cope, 1866)
- Amerotyphlops minuisquamus (Dixon & Hendricks, 1979)
- Amerotyphlops montanum Graboski, Arredondo, Grazziotin, Guerra-Fuentes, Pereira Filho, Silva, Prudente, Pinto, Rodrigues, Bonatto & Zaher, 2022
- Amerotyphlops paucisquamus (Dixon & Hendricks, 1979)
- Amerotyphlops reticulatus (Linnaeus, 1758)
- Amerotyphlops stadelmani (Schmidt, 1936)
- Amerotyphlops tasymicris (Thomas, 1974)
- Amerotyphlops tenuis (Salvin, 1860)
- Amerotyphlops trinitatus (Richmond, 1965)
- Amerotyphlops tycherus (Townsend, Wilson, Ketzler & Luque-Montes, 2008)
- Amerotyphlops yonenagae (Rodrigues, 1991)

Nota bene: A binomial authority in parentheses indicates that the species was originally described in a genus other than Amerotyphlops.
