= Bluff Downs giant python =

Bluff Downs giant python Temporal range: Early Pliocene 4 Ma

Scientific classification
- Kingdom: Animalia
- Phylum: Chordata
- Class: Reptilia
- Order: Squamata
- Suborder: Serpentes
- Family: Pythonidae
- Genus: Liasis
- Species: †L. dubudingala

Binomial name
- †Liasis dubudingala Scanlon and Mackness, 2002

Extinct species of snake

The Bluff Downs giant python (Liasis dubudingala) is an extinct species of snake from Queensland, Australia, that lived during the Early Pliocene. Named in 2002, Liasis dubudingala was likely the biggest snake found in Australia, with a total length of up to 9 m (30 ft). This length rivals the largest extant snake species, the reticulated python from Asia and the green anaconda from South America. It may have fed on larger prey such as juvenile diprotodontids, but it is also possible that it was a skilled climber capable of catching birds and arboreal marsupials.

== History and naming ==
The first fossil remains of Liasis dubudingala were discovered in 1975 by Australian paleontologist Mike Archer in the early Pliocene sediments of the Allingham Formation, Queensland. The trunk vertebra was initially assigned to the genus Morelia by Archer, but later research found sufficient evidence to assign the material to the genus Liasis, with Scanlon and Mackness erecting a new species for the material in 2002. The trunk vertebra discovered by Archer, QMF 9132, was chosen to be the holotype, but a number of additional fossils including vertebrae, ribs, teeth and a dentary were also referred to the species.

The species name "dubudingala" is a combination of the words dubu ("ghost") and dingal ("to squeeze"), both deriving from the Guugu Yalandji language. This combination, effectively meaning "ghost squeezer", was chosen to reflect the likely constricting habits of the python. The Australian Museum furthermore coined the vernacular name Bluff Downs giant python.

== Description ==
The neural spines of Liasis dubudingala were higher than they were long and slope backwards, however the dorsoposterior angle of said slope is blunt rather than accute. In general the entire vertebra is notably higher than long, with the neural spine, neural arch and centrum all contributing to the height in equal measures. The roof of the zygosphene slopes at a steep angle and its junction with the neural spine is blunt. The articular processes are almost horizontal with a slope of less than 5%. The hypapophysis below the centrum grows gradually more shallow from the front to the back, rather than doing so more abruptly. Additionally, the haemal keel of Liasis dubudingala is pronounced throughout the trunk of the vertebrae. While the holotype vertebra is from the middle of the snake's trunk, the most numerous vertebrae correspond with the anterior trunk region, before the heart. These precardiac vertebrae are higher than they are long like those of the middle trunk, however to a much greater degree, expressing a ratio of almost 2:1 between height and length. This ratio is less well developed in the posterior trunk vertebrae, which also display longer vertebral centra and less horizontal zygapophyses. At least one vertebra, alongside a dentary fragment, appear to belong to a juvenile specimen. The dentary preserves a large portion of the posterior tooth row, showing ten alveoli situated on a raised ridge. Safe for the second, fourth and sixth of these alveoli, all teeth in the dentary fragment are ankylosed, meaning they are permanently fused to the jaw bone. The curvature is similar to those of the modern olive python, although the teeth are smaller in diameter.

Liasis dubudingala was likely among the largest snakes to have existed in Australia, with the largest vertebra measuring a total of 59.1 mm (2.33 in) wide. Using Scanlon's 1993 method of estimating the size of fossil snakes, this would result in a total length of 8.35 m (27.4 ft). However, this method is based on the proportions of the extant Black-headed python, which is known to have a spine composed of 394 individual vertebrae, contrasting with the average of 450 vertebrae that make up the skeleton of large Liasis species. This would increase the length of Liasis dubudingala to roughly 9 m (30 ft). With this length the Bluff Downs giant python would have been the largest snake of Australia, even exceeding the madtsoiid snake Yurlunggur.

== Classification ==
In the type description of Liasis dubudingala, Scanlon and MacKnees consider the genera Antaresia, Bothrochilus, Leiopython and Apodora to all be synonymous with Liasis. The authors subsequently diagnose the genus based on a variety of traits including the anatomy of the skull, overall proportions, scales and the anatomy of the hemipenis. Although none of the traits used to define Liasis sensu lato in this manner could be observed in the Bluff Downs giant python, the authors nevertheless assign it to the genus based on general similarities. While the high neural spine can also be found in Morelia and Python, the Bluff Downs giant python was found to lack several derived traits that would connect it to the aforementioned genera. Outside of Morelia and Python, high neural spines are also found in the species of Liasis sensu stricto, meaning Liasis species in the strictest definition (Liasis olivacea and Liasis mackloti). Scanlon and MacKnees conclude that based on the available characteristics, Liasis dubudingala was likely either a sister taxon to or part of Liasis sensu stricto.

== Paleoecology ==
Liasis dubudingala coexisted with a multitude of other reptiles, including multiple crocodilians and a large-bodied monitor lizard. Besides Quinkana babarra, other predators of the Bluff Downs Local Fauna include the two marsupials Thylacoleo crassidentatus and Dasyurus dunmalli. Like modern pythons, Liasis dubudingala likely hunted using heat sensitive pits located around the mouth. However due to the lack of adult skull material, the gape and consequently the maximum prey size could not be determined. Determining head size based on body size meanwhile is a complicated matter, as different snakes may vary greatly in proportions. Morelia amethistina for example is known to be relatively slender, but specimens with a body length of less than 6 m (20 ft) are still known to be capable of killing and feeding on wallabies. The reticulated python meanwhile, which is close in size to Liasis dubudingala, is known to feed on large prey including but not limited to pigs, deer and primates. Prey availability is an equally important factor and the Pliocene Bluff Downs was likely similar to the modern Kakadu National Park, although potentially with patches of more closed forest. The climate was also favorable to large snakes, with the warm temperatures and humidity being important factors that aid in snake digestion.

Based on environment, size and the favorable climatic conditions, it's possible that Liasis dubudingala could have fed on relatively large prey including juvenile diprotodontids. At the same time, the high neural spine is a possible indicator that the python was a capable climber that may have also preyed on birds, reptiles and arboreal mammals, which would match the presence of more densely forested areas during the Pliocene.
