= Olive blind snake =

Scientific classification
- Domain: Eukaryota
- Kingdom: Animalia
- Phylum: Chordata
- Class: Reptilia
- Order: Squamata
- Suborder: Serpentes
- Family: Typhlopidae
- Genus: Ramphotyphlops
- Species: R. olivaceus

Binomial name
- Ramphotyphlops olivaceus (Gray, 1845)

Synonyms
- Onychophis olivaceus; Onychocephalus olivaceus; Typhlops olivaceus; Typhlops ligorostris; Typhlina olivacea

Species of snake

The olive blind snake (Ramphotyphlops olivaceus) is a species of snake in the Typhlopidae family.
