= Yonenga worm snake =

Conservation status
- Least Concern (IUCN 3.1)

Scientific classification
- Kingdom: Animalia
- Phylum: Chordata
- Class: Reptilia
- Order: Squamata
- Suborder: Serpentes
- Family: Typhlopidae
- Genus: Amerotyphlops
- Species: A. yonenagae

Binomial name
- Amerotyphlops yonenagae (Rodriques, 1991)

Synonyms
- Typhlops yonenagae Rodrigues, 1991; Amerotyphlops yonenagae — Hedges et al., 2014

Species of snake

The Yonenga worm snake (Amerotyphlops yonenagae), also known commonly as Yonenaga's worm snake, is a species of snake in the family Typhlopidae. The species is endemic to Brazil.

== Etymology ==
The specific name, yonenagae (Latin, feminine, genitive singular), is in honor of Yatiyo Yonenaga-Yassuda. She is a Brazilian mammalogist of Japanese descent.

== Geographic range ==
A. yonenagae is found in the Brazilian state of Bahia.

== Habitat ==
The preferred natural habitat of A. yonenagae is forest.

== Description ==
Small for its family, A. yonenagae may attain a total length (including tail) of 20 cm (7.9 in). It has 18 scale rows around the body, for the full length of the body. Dorsally, it is cream-colored, with a darker middorsal line, which is well-marked and extends from the back of the head to the tail. Ventrally, it is immaculate.

== Reproduction ==
A. yonenagae is oviparous.
