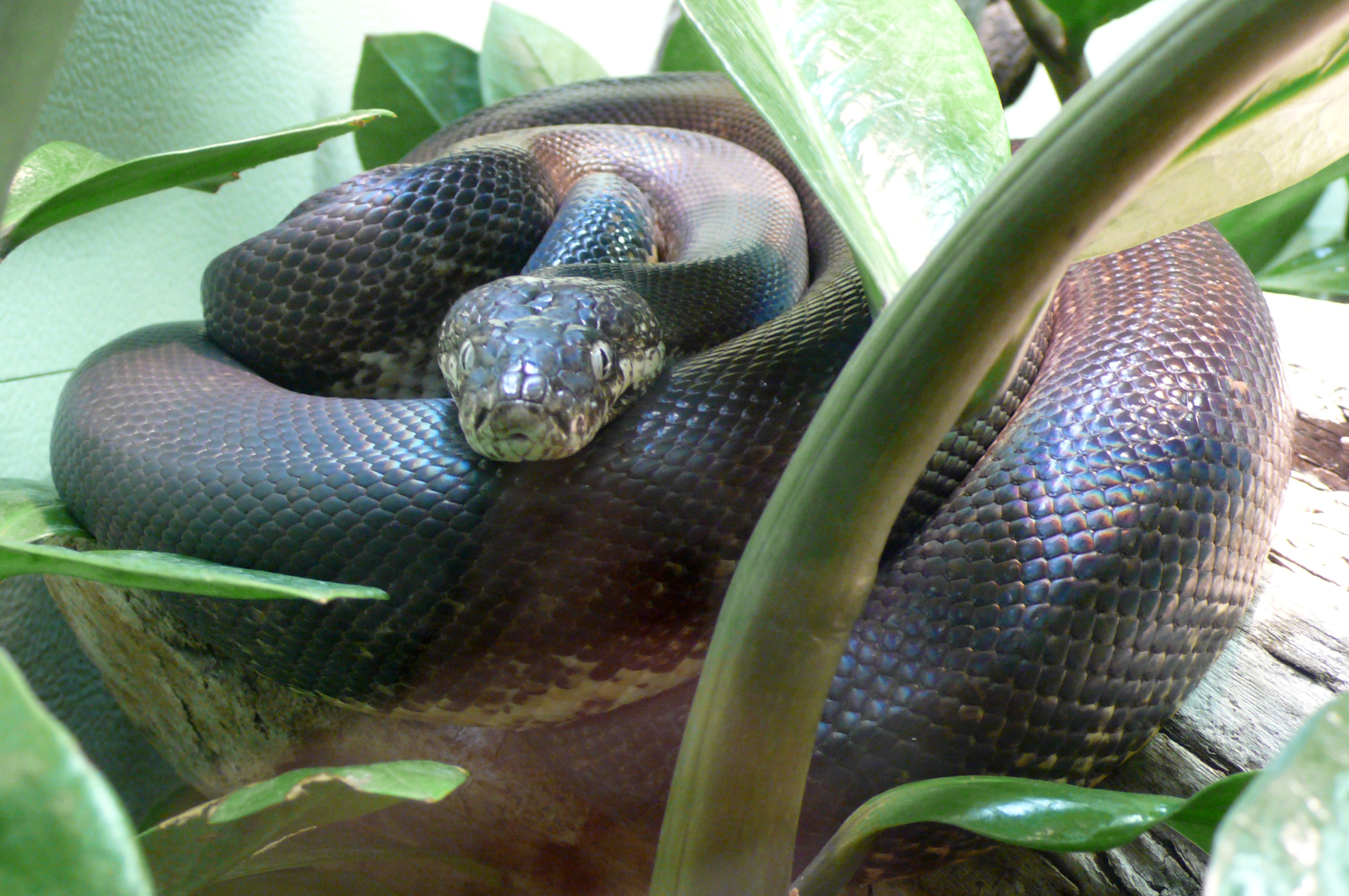
- Liasis mackloti

Scientific classification
- Kingdom: Animalia
- Phylum: Chordata
- Class: Reptilia
- Order: Squamata
- Suborder: Serpentes
- Family: Pythonidae
- Subfamily: Pythoninae
- Genus: Liasis; Gray, 1842

Species
- See text

Synonyms
- Liasis Gray, 1840; Liasis Gray, 1842; Simalia Gray, 1849; Lisalia Gray, 1849

= Liasis =

Genus of snakes

Liasis is a genus of snakes in the family Pythonidae. Species of the genus Liasis are native to Indonesia, New Guinea and Australia. Currently, three extant species are recognized, and one giant fossil species L. dubudingala is estimated to have been around 10 m (33 ft) in length.

== Geographic range ==
Liasis species are found in Indonesia in the Lesser Sunda Islands, east through New Guinea and in northern and western Australia.

== Species ==
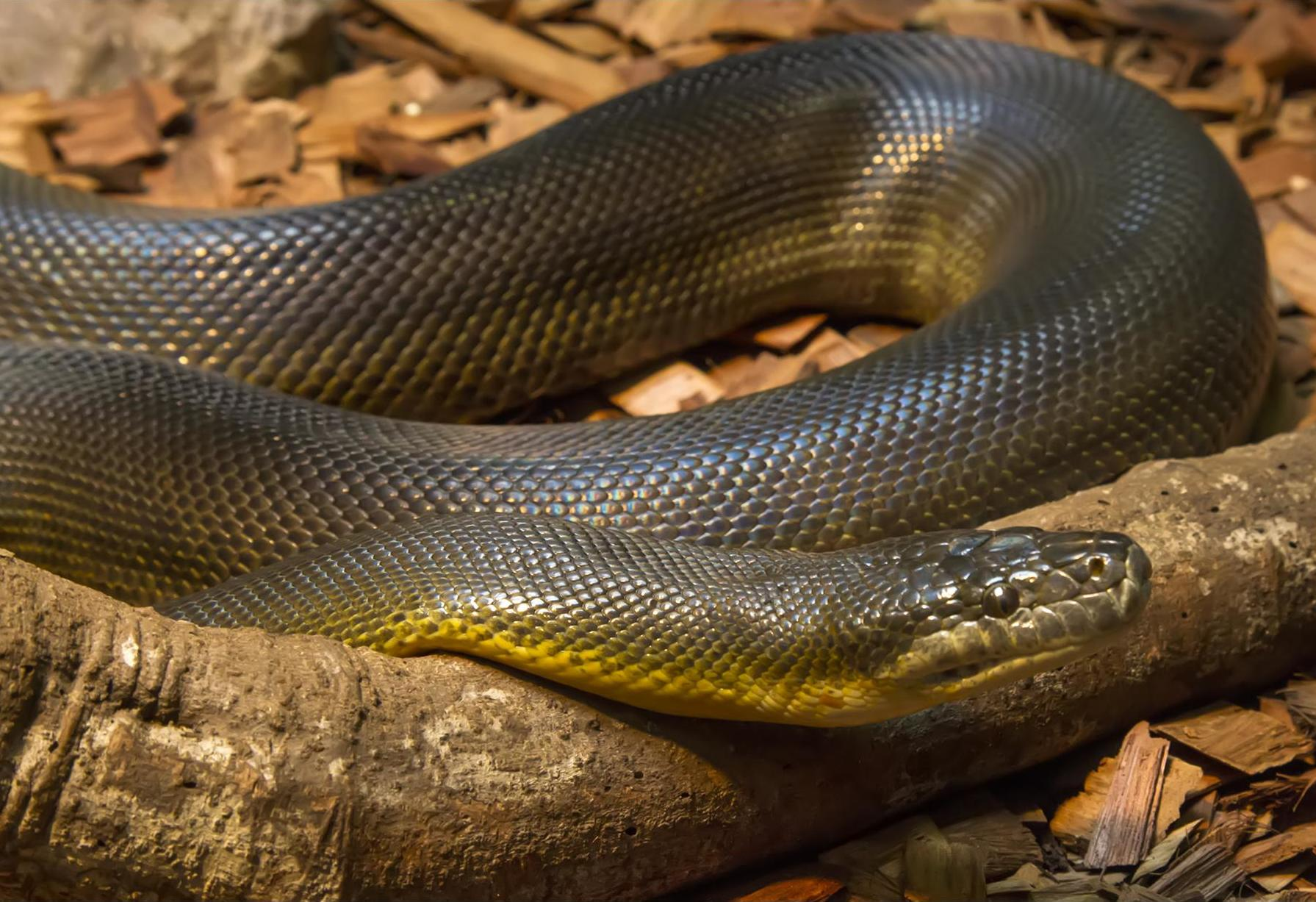
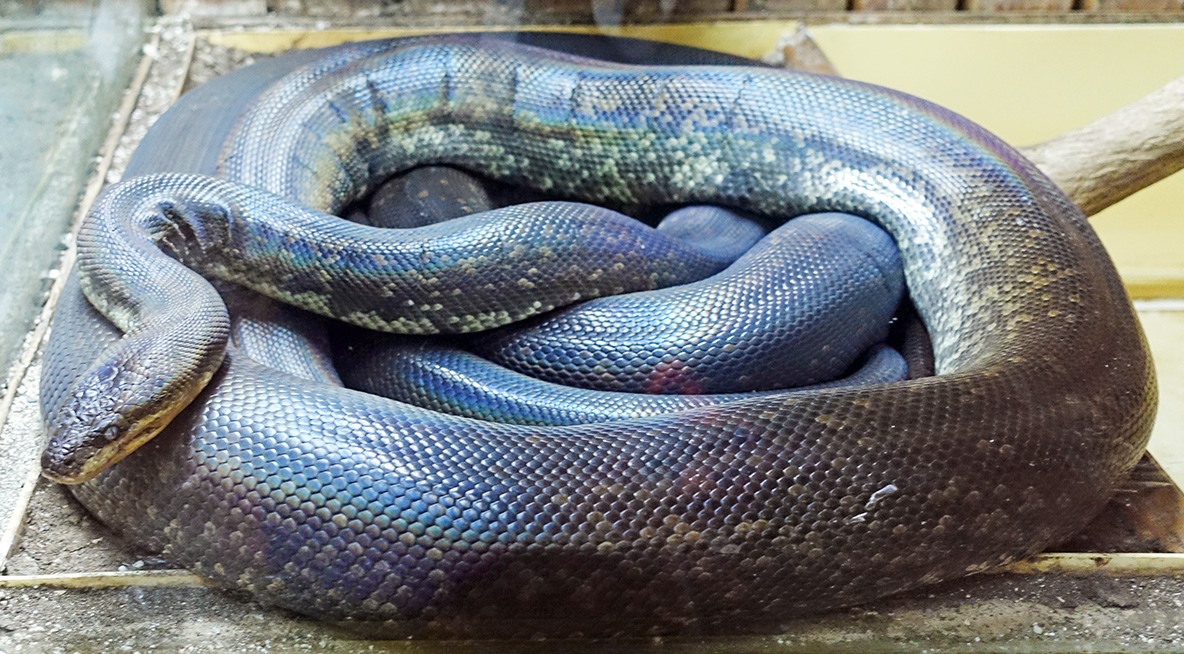
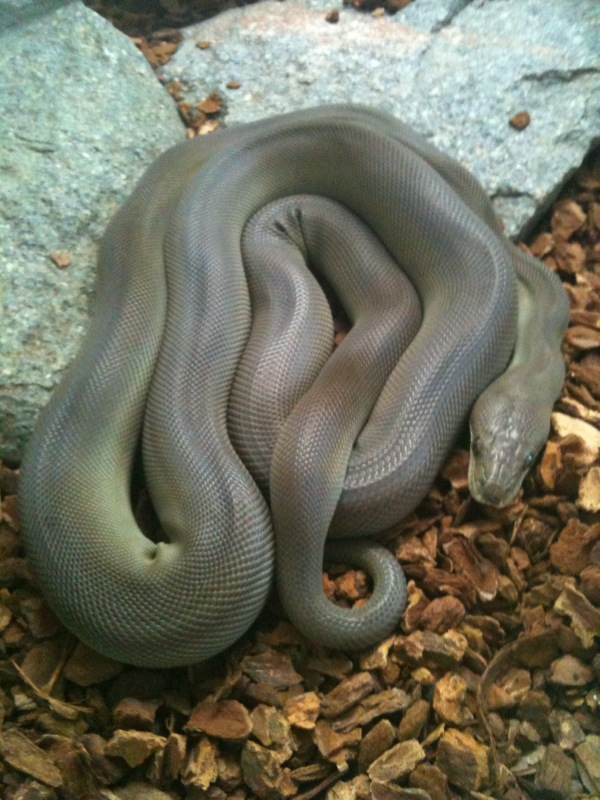
Species	Taxon author	Subsp.*	Common name	Geographic range
L. fuscus	W. Peters, 1873	0	water python	Australia (Western Australia, Northern Territory and Queensland), the Sir Charles Hardy Islands, Cornwallis Island in the Torres Strait, Papua New Guinea (lower Fly River region) and Indonesia (southern Papua)
L. mackloti^{T}	A.M.C. Duméril & Bibron, 1844	2	Macklot's python	Indonesia in the Lesser Sunda Islands of Roti, Samao, Timor, Wetar and Savu
L. olivaceus	Gray, 1842	1	olive python	Australia in Western Australia, Northern Territory and Queensland

)*Not including the nominate subspecies
)^{T}Type species

=== Extinct species ===
Species	Taxon author	Subsp.*	Common name	Geographic range
L.dubudingala	Scanlon and Mackness, 2002	0	Bluff Downs giant python	Australia (Northern Queensland)
