= Southern New Guinea blind snake =

Scientific classification
- Domain: Eukaryota
- Kingdom: Animalia
- Phylum: Chordata
- Class: Reptilia
- Order: Squamata
- Suborder: Serpentes
- Family: Typhlopidae
- Genus: Ramphotyphlops
- Species: R. bipartitus

Binomial name
- Ramphotyphlops bipartitus (Sauvage, 1879)

Synonyms
- Typhlops bipartitus

Species of snake

The southern New Guinea blind snake (Ramphotyphlops bipartitus) is a species of snake in the Typhlopidae family.
