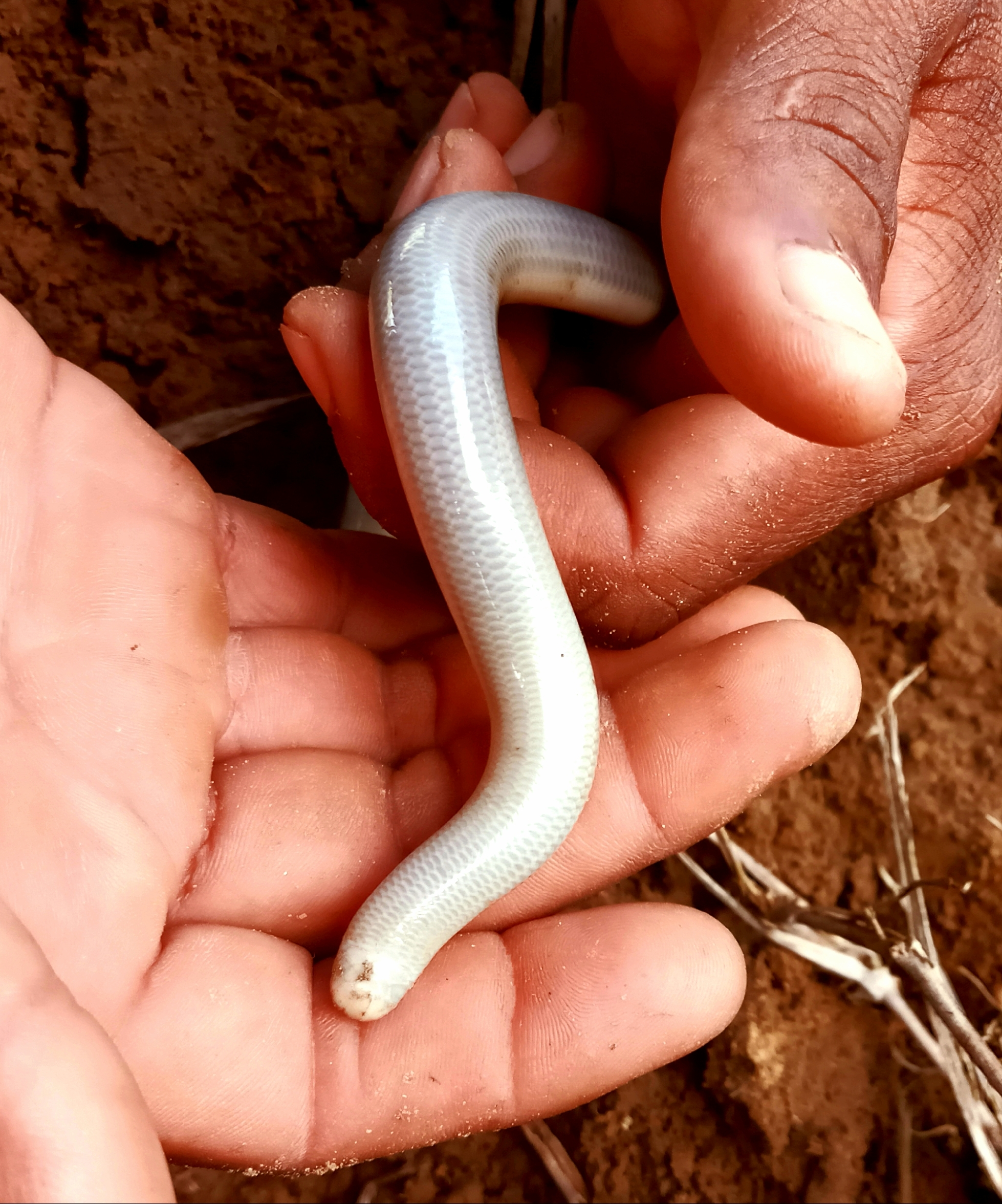

Scientific classification
- Kingdom: Animalia
- Phylum: Chordata
- Order: Squamata
- Suborder: Serpentes
- Family: Typhlopidae
- Genus: Amerotyphlops
- Species: A. paucisquamus

Binomial name
- Amerotyphlops paucisquamus (Dixon, 1979)

Synonyms
- Typhlops paucisquamus

= Pernambuco worm snake =

Species of snake

The Pernambuco worm snake (Amerotyphlops paucisquamus) is a species of snake in the Typhlopidae family.
