= Costa Rica worm snake =

Conservation status
- Least Concern (IUCN 3.1)

Scientific classification
- Kingdom: Animalia
- Phylum: Chordata
- Class: Reptilia
- Order: Squamata
- Suborder: Serpentes
- Family: Typhlopidae
- Genus: Amerotyphlops
- Species: A. costaricensis

Binomial name
- Amerotyphlops costaricensis (Jiménez & Savage, 1963)

Synonyms
- Typhlops costaricensis

Species of snake

The Costa Rica worm snake (Amerotyphlops costaricensis) is a species of snake in the Typhlopidae family.
