= Hook-nosed blind snake =

Conservation status
- Least Concern (IUCN 3.1)

Scientific classification
- Kingdom: Animalia
- Phylum: Chordata
- Class: Reptilia
- Order: Squamata
- Suborder: Serpentes
- Family: Typhlopidae
- Genus: Ramphotyphlops
- Species: R. multilineatus

Binomial name
- Ramphotyphlops multilineatus (Schlegel, 1839)

Synonyms
- Typhlops multilineatus; Rhinotyphlops multilineatus; Onychocephalus multilineatus; Onychophis multicarinatus; Typhlina multilineata

Species of snake

The hook-nosed blind snake (Ramphotyphlops multilineatus) is a species of snake in the Typhlopidae family.
