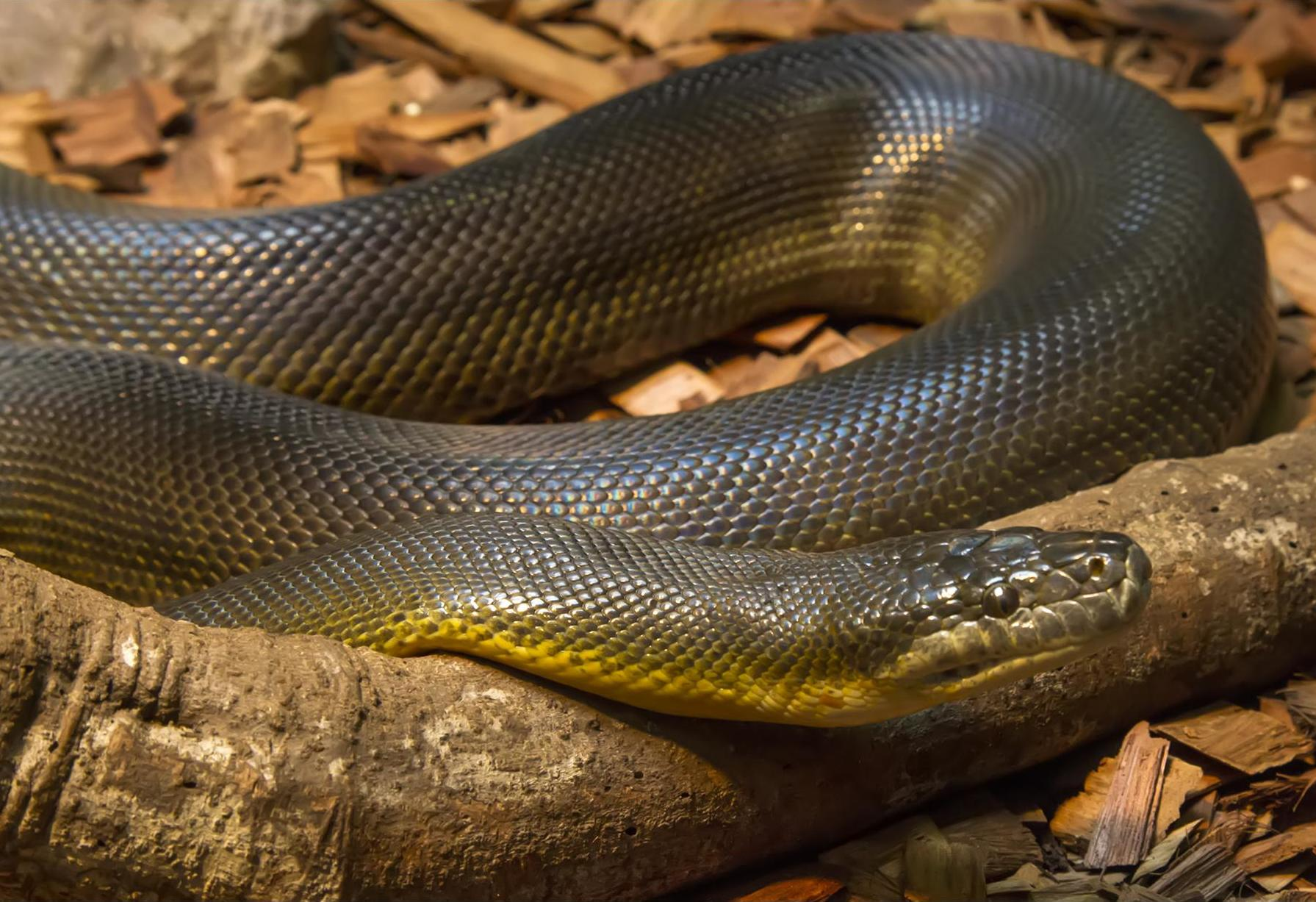
- Captive water python at Australia Zoo

Conservation status
- Least Concern (IUCN 3.1)

Scientific classification
- Kingdom: Animalia
- Phylum: Chordata
- Class: Reptilia
- Order: Squamata
- Suborder: Serpentes
- Family: Pythonidae
- Genus: Liasis
- Species: L. fuscus

Binomial name
- Liasis fuscus Peters, 1873

Synonyms
- Liasis fuscus - Peters, 1873; Liasis cornwallisius - Günther, 1879; Nardoa crassa - Macleay, 1886; Liasis fuscus - Boulenger, 1893; Liasis fuscus fuscus - Stull, 1935; Bothrochilus fuscus - Cogger, Cameron & Cogger, 1983; Lisalia fuscus - Wells & Wellington, 1984; Lisalia fusca - Wells & Wellington, 1985; Morelia fusca - Underwood & Stimson, 1990; Liasis fuscus - Cogger, 1992

= Water python =

Species of snake

The water python (Liasis fuscus) is a python species found in Australia and Papua New Guinea. No subspecies are currently recognized. Like all other pythons, it is not venomous.

== Taxonomy ==
German naturalist Wilhelm Peters described the water python in 1873. It is also known as the brown water python.

== Description ==
Adults average about 6–8 feet (2+ meters) in length, but may reach 10 feet (3.0 meters). Robustly built, it has a long head that is slightly distinct from the neck. The anterior supralabials have thermosensitive pits.

Scalation includes a pair of undivided parietal scales and a single loreal scale on either side of the head. On the body, the dorsal scales number 45-55 at midbody, the ventral scales 270-300, the anal scale is single, with 60-90 paired subcaudal scales.

The color pattern consists of a uniform, iridescent dark blackish brown dorsal color. The belly is a dull to bright yellow that includes the first few rows of dorsal scales. The throat is cream colored, while the upper labials are light gray-brown with dark brown or black spots.

== Distribution and habitat ==
They are found in Australia in the Kimberley district of northern Western Australia from around Broome east through Northern Territory at least as far south as Mataranka to the coast of central Queensland to near Mackay. Also found in the Sir Charles Hardy Islands, on Cornwallis Island in the Torres Strait, and in Papua New Guinea, Western District, in the lower Fly River region at least as far inland as Lake Daviumbo. It can also be found in the southern part of Papuan province of Indonesia. The type locality given is "Port Bowen" (Port Clinton, Queensland, Australia).

The highest population density is reached on the Adelaide River floodplains in the Northern Territory.

== Behavior ==
Despite its common name, many individuals are found far from water for most of the year. They are usually nocturnal, seeking shelter during the day in hollow logs, in riverbank dens, and in vegetation. When surprised, most attempt to flee into any available water.

== Feeding ==
An opportunistic feeder, its diet consists of a variety of vertebrates. However, on the Adelaide River floodplains, this species preys mainly on dusky rats (Rattus colletti).

In North Johnstone River, potential prey of water pythons include long-finned eels, freshwater catfish, bullrout, sooty grunters, spotted tilapia, sleepy cod, and prawns.

== Reproduction ==
Mating takes place in July–August, which is the middle of the dry season. This is followed by a gestation period of about a month, after which females lay an average of 12 eggs. The hatchlings emerge after 57–61 days of incubation and are each about 30 cm in length.
