= Arthur Willey =

Director of Colombo Museum, Ceylon

Arthur Willey FRS (9 October 1867 in Scarborough, North Yorkshire – 26 December 1942) was a British-Canadian zoologist.

After education at Kingswood School, Bath, he matriculated in 1887 at University College London and graduated there with B.Sc. in 1890.

During the long vacation of 1889 and again in the following year he proceeded to Messina at the instance of Lankester and there carried out the investigations of Amphioxus which formed the subject matter of his first published papers. In 1891 he spent some months at Freiburg under Weismann and later on spent a year at the Marine Stations of Plymouth and Naples, working chiefly on the development of the Ascidians.

After returning from the Marine Station (Stazione Zoologica), Naples, he became a fellow at University College London. From 1892 to 1894 he was a biological tutor at Columbia University. From 1894 to 1899 he held the Balfour Studentship of Cambridge, during which he went to the East Indies to investigate the embryology of the pearly nautilus. From 1899 to 1901 he was a lecturer in biology at Guy's Hospital. In 1902 he was elected F.R.S. From 1902 to 1909 he was the director of the Colombo Museum and the editor of Spolia Zeylanica. In 1907 he was a marine biologist for the Ceylon Government. In 1910 he became the Strathcona Professor at McGill University in Montreal and retired there as professor emeritus in 1932. In 1902 in Hendon, Middlesex, he married Emily Constance Bowd, and after his retirement in 1932 they lived in a cottage about an hour's drive from Montreal.

== Eponyms ==
- Balanoglossus jamaicensis Willey, 1899
- Ramphotyphlops willeyi (Boulenger, 1900)

== Selected publications ==
- Amphioxus and the ancestry of the vertebrates. CIHM/ICMH Microfiche series = CIHM/ICMH collection de microfiches; no. 28165. Mcmillan. 1894. ISBN 9780665281655; With a preface by Henry Fairfield Osborn
- Zoological results based on material from New Britain, New Guinea, Loyalty Islands and elsewhere, collected during the years 1895, 1896 and 1897. Columbia University biological series,2. Macmillan. 1898.
- Convergence in evolution. E.P. Dutton. 1911.
- Crustacea, Part K: marine Copepoda. Canadian Arctic Expedition 1913–18, Volume VII: Crustacea, Part K. T. Mulvey. 1920. ISBN 9780665828416.
