= Emoia brongersmai =

Conservation status
- Least Concern (IUCN 3.1)

Scientific classification
- Kingdom: Animalia
- Phylum: Chordata
- Class: Reptilia
- Order: Squamata
- Family: Scincidae
- Genus: Emoia
- Species: E. brongersmai

Binomial name
- Emoia brongersmai W.C. Brown, 1991

Species of lizard

Emoia brongersmai, also known commonly as Brongersma's emo skink and Brongersma's forest skink, is a species of lizard in the family Scincidae. The species is native to Indonesia.

== Etymology ==
The specific name, brongersmai, is in honor of Dutch herpetologist Leo Brongersma.
