= Yucatán worm snake =

Conservation status
- Least Concern (IUCN 3.1)

Scientific classification
- Kingdom: Animalia
- Phylum: Chordata
- Class: Reptilia
- Order: Squamata
- Suborder: Serpentes
- Family: Typhlopidae
- Genus: Amerotyphlops
- Species: A. microstomus

Binomial name
- Amerotyphlops microstomus (Cope, 1866)

Synonyms
- Typhlops microstomus

Species of snake

The Yucatán worm snake (Amerotyphlops microstomus) is a species of snake in the Typhlopidae family.
