= Manukwari blind snake =

Conservation status
- Data Deficient (IUCN 3.1)

Scientific classification
- Kingdom: Animalia
- Phylum: Chordata
- Class: Reptilia
- Order: Squamata
- Suborder: Serpentes
- Family: Typhlopidae
- Genus: Ramphotyphlops
- Species: R. similis

Binomial name
- Ramphotyphlops similis (Brongersma, 1934)

Synonyms
- Typhlops similis

Species of snake

The Manukwari blind snake (Ramphotyphlops similis) is a species of snake in the Typhlopidae family.
