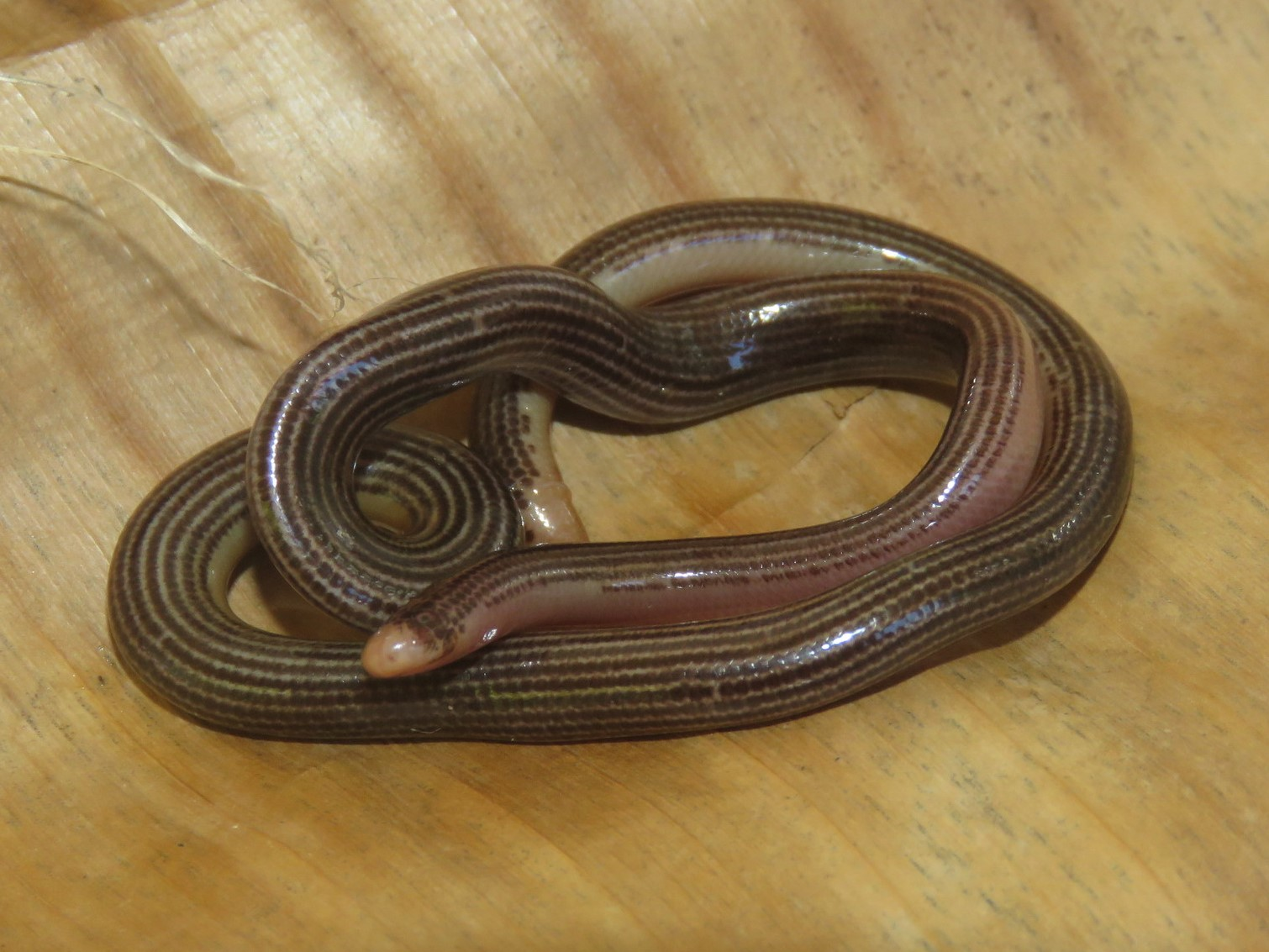

Conservation status
- Endangered (IUCN 3.1)

Scientific classification
- Kingdom: Animalia
- Phylum: Chordata
- Class: Reptilia
- Order: Squamata
- Suborder: Serpentes
- Family: Typhlopidae
- Genus: Amerotyphlops
- Species: A. trinitatus

Binomial name
- Amerotyphlops trinitatus (Richmond, 1965)

Synonyms
- Typhlops trinitatus Richmond, 1965; Amerotyphlops trinitatus — Hedges et al., 2014; Typhlops trinitatus — Wallach et al., 2014

= Amerotyphlops trinitatus =

Species of snake

Amerotyphlops trinitatus, known commonly as the Trinidad blindsnake, Trinidad worm snake, and Trinidad burrowing snake, is a harmless blind snake species in the family Typhlopidae. The species is endemic to Trinidad and Tobago. There are no subspecies that are recognized as being valid.

== Description ==
A. trinitatus grows to a maximum total length (including tail) of 24 cm (9.4 in).

== Geographic range ==
Found mostly on the island of Tobago, A. trinitatus is known from widely scattered locations, and from a single location on the island of Trinidad, which happens to be the type locality. This is described as "Trinidad [County of St. George], ... Arima Road, 3 miles above [north of] Simla [Research Station]".

== Habitat ==
The preferred natural habitat of A. trinitatus is forest, at altitudes of 10–300 m (33–984 ft).

== Reproduction ==
Amerotyphlops trinitatus is oviparous.
