= Cuming's blind snake =

Conservation status
- Data Deficient (IUCN 3.1)

Scientific classification
- Kingdom: Animalia
- Phylum: Chordata
- Class: Reptilia
- Order: Squamata
- Suborder: Serpentes
- Family: Typhlopidae
- Genus: Ramphotyphlops
- Species: R. cumingii

Binomial name
- Ramphotyphlops cumingii (Gray, 1845)

Synonyms
- Onychophis cumingii Gray, 1845; Onycocephalus cumingii — Boettger, 1886; Typhlops cumingii — Boulenger, 1893; Typhlops rugosa Taylor, 1919; Typhlops longicauda Taylor, 1919; Typhlops dendrophis Taylor, 1922; Typhlops mindanensis Taylor, 1922; Typhlina cumingii — McDowell, 1974; Ramphotyphlops cumingii — McDiarmid, Campbell & Touré, 1999

Species of snake

Cuming's blind snake (Ramphotyphlops cumingii) is a species of snake in the family Typhlopidae. The species is endemic to the Philippines.

== Etymology ==
The specific name, cumingii, is in honor of English conchologist and botanist Hugh Cuming.

== Geographic range ==
In the Philippines, R. cumingii is found on Bohol, Marinduque, Mindanao, Negros, Panay, and Polillo.

== Habitat ==
The preferred natural habitat of R. cumingii is forest.

== Reproduction ==
R. cumingii is oviparous.
