= Palau Island blind snake =

Conservation status
- Least Concern (IUCN 3.1)

Scientific classification
- Kingdom: Animalia
- Phylum: Chordata
- Class: Reptilia
- Order: Squamata
- Suborder: Serpentes
- Family: Typhlopidae
- Genus: Ramphotyphlops
- Species: R. acuticauda

Binomial name
- Ramphotyphlops acuticauda (Peters, 1877)

Synonyms
- Typhlops acuticauda; Ramphotyphlops acuticaudus

Species of snake

The Palau Island blind snake (Ramphotyphlops acuticauda) is a species of snake in the Typhlopidae family.
