= Ramphotyphlops adocetus =

Scientific classification
- Kingdom: Animalia
- Phylum: Chordata
- Class: Reptilia
- Order: Squamata
- Suborder: Serpentes
- Family: Typhlopidae
- Genus: Ramphotyphlops
- Species: R. adocetus

Binomial name
- Ramphotyphlops adocetus Wynn, Reynolds, Buden, Falanruw & Lynch, 2012

Species of blind snake

Ramphotyphlops adocetus is a species of blind snake that is endemic to Micronesia. The specific epithet adocetus (“unexpected” or “surprising”) refers to the unexpected discovery of this snake on a remote atoll.

== Distribution ==
The species occurs in the Caroline Islands in the Federated States of Micronesia. The type locality is Pasa Island, Ant Atoll.
