= Basin worm snake =

Scientific classification
- Kingdom: Animalia
- Phylum: Chordata
- Order: Squamata
- Suborder: Serpentes
- Family: Typhlopidae
- Genus: Amerotyphlops
- Species: A. minuisquamus

Binomial name
- Amerotyphlops minuisquamus (Dixon, 1979)

Synonyms
- Typhlops minuisquamus

Species of snake

The Basin worm snake (Amerotyphlops minuisquamus) is a species of snake in the Typhlopidae family. It has been reported in Colombia, Peru, Brazil (Amazonas) and Guyana.
