= Moluccan bow-fingered gecko =

Conservation status
- Vulnerable (IUCN 3.1)

Scientific classification
- Kingdom: Animalia
- Phylum: Chordata
- Class: Reptilia
- Order: Squamata
- Suborder: Gekkota
- Family: Gekkonidae
- Genus: Cyrtodactylus
- Species: C. deveti

Binomial name
- Cyrtodactylus deveti (Brongersma, 1948)
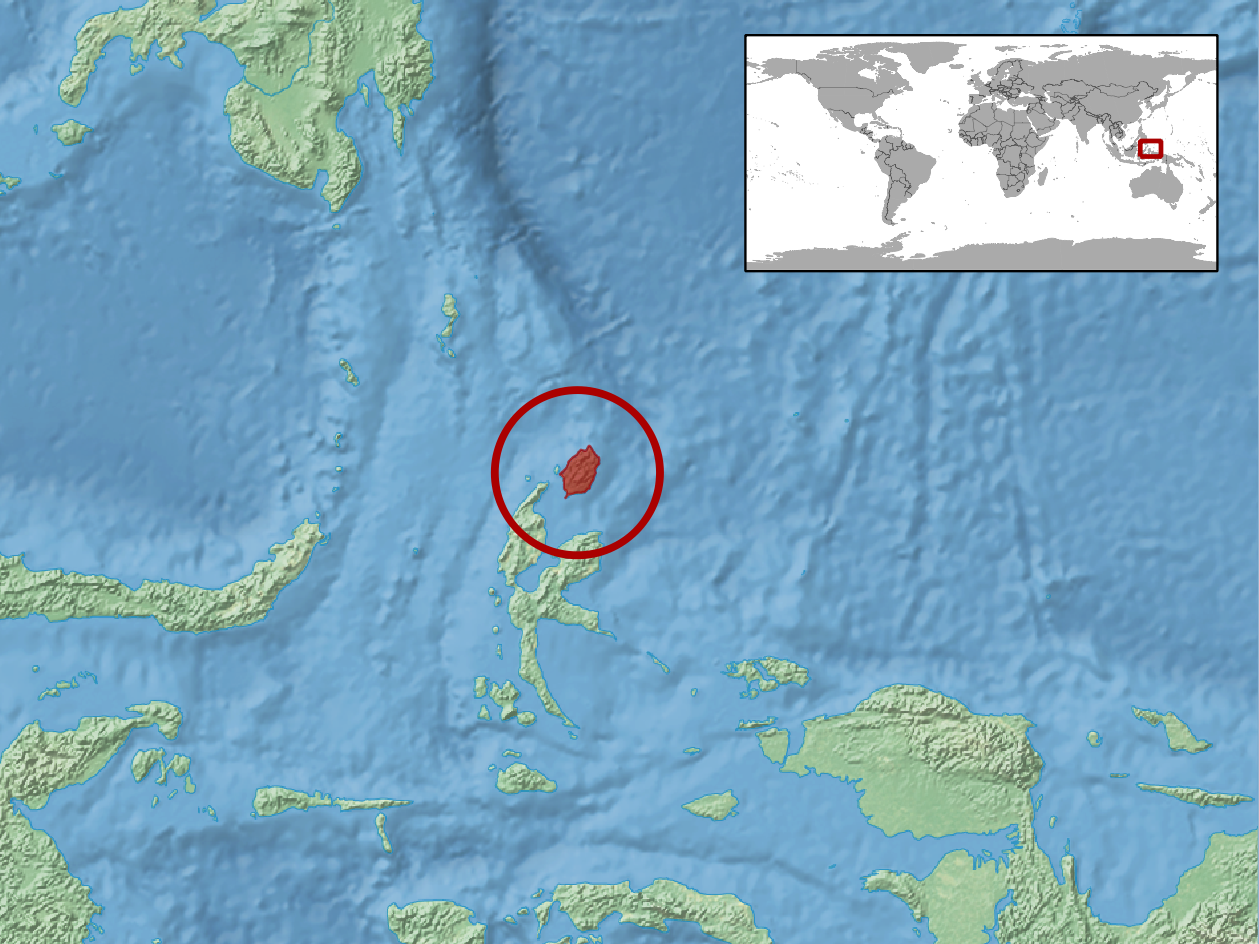

Synonyms
- Gymnodactylus deveti Brongersma, 1948; Cyrtodactylus deveti — Rösler, 2000

Species of lizard

The Moluccan bow-fingered gecko (Cyrtodactylus deveti) is a species of lizard in the family Gekkonidae. The species is endemic to the Moluccas in Indonesia.

== Etymology ==
The specific name, deveti, is in honor of Dutch neurosurgeon Arnold C. De Vet (1904–2001).

== Geographic range ==
C. deveti is found in the northern Moluccas, on the islands of Halmahera and Morotai.

== Habitat ==
The preferred natural habitat of C. deveti is forest, at altitudes from sea level to 600 m (2,000 ft).

== Reproduction ==
C. deveti is oviparous.
