= Ramphotyphlops mansuetus =

Scientific classification
- Domain: Eukaryota
- Kingdom: Animalia
- Phylum: Chordata
- Class: Reptilia
- Order: Squamata
- Suborder: Serpentes
- Family: Typhlopidae
- Genus: Ramphotyphlops
- Species: R. mansuetus

Binomial name
- Ramphotyphlops mansuetus (Barbour, 1921)

Synonyms
- Typhlops cumingii mansuetus Barbour, 1921; Ramphotyphlops mansuetus Wallach, 2003

Species of blind snake

Ramphotyphlops mansuetus, also known as the small-headed blind snake, is a species of blind snake that is native to the Solomon Islands archipelago. The specific epithet mansuetus is Latin for “tame”.

== Distribution and habitat ==
The type locality is Makira (San Cristobal) in the Solomon Islands. The snake has also been collected on Bougainville Island, politically part of Papua New Guinea.
