= Grenada worm snake =

Conservation status
- Endangered (IUCN 3.1)

Scientific classification
- Kingdom: Animalia
- Phylum: Chordata
- Class: Reptilia
- Order: Squamata
- Suborder: Serpentes
- Family: Typhlopidae
- Genus: Amerotyphlops
- Species: A. tasymicris

Binomial name
- Amerotyphlops tasymicris (Thomas, 1974)

Synonyms
- Typhlops tasymicris

Species of snake

The Grenada worm snake or Grenada Bank blindsnake (Amerotyphlops tasymicris) is a species of blind snake that is endemic to Grenada, an island in the Caribbean Lesser Antilles.

It reaches a total length of 180 mm. It has light lines on its dorsal surface, and its ventral surface is unpigmented.
