= Melanesia blind snake =

Conservation status
- Least Concern (IUCN 3.1)

Scientific classification
- Kingdom: Animalia
- Phylum: Chordata
- Class: Reptilia
- Order: Squamata
- Suborder: Serpentes
- Family: Typhlopidae
- Genus: Ramphotyphlops
- Species: R. depressus

Binomial name
- Ramphotyphlops depressus (Peters, 1880)

Synonyms
- Typhlops aluensis; Typhlops depressus; Typhlops philococos; Typhlops philococcus; Typhlops buehleri; Ramphotyphlops aluensis; Ramphotyphlops buehleri

Species of snake

The Melanesia blind snake (Ramphotyphlops depressus) is a species of snake in the Typhlopidae family.
