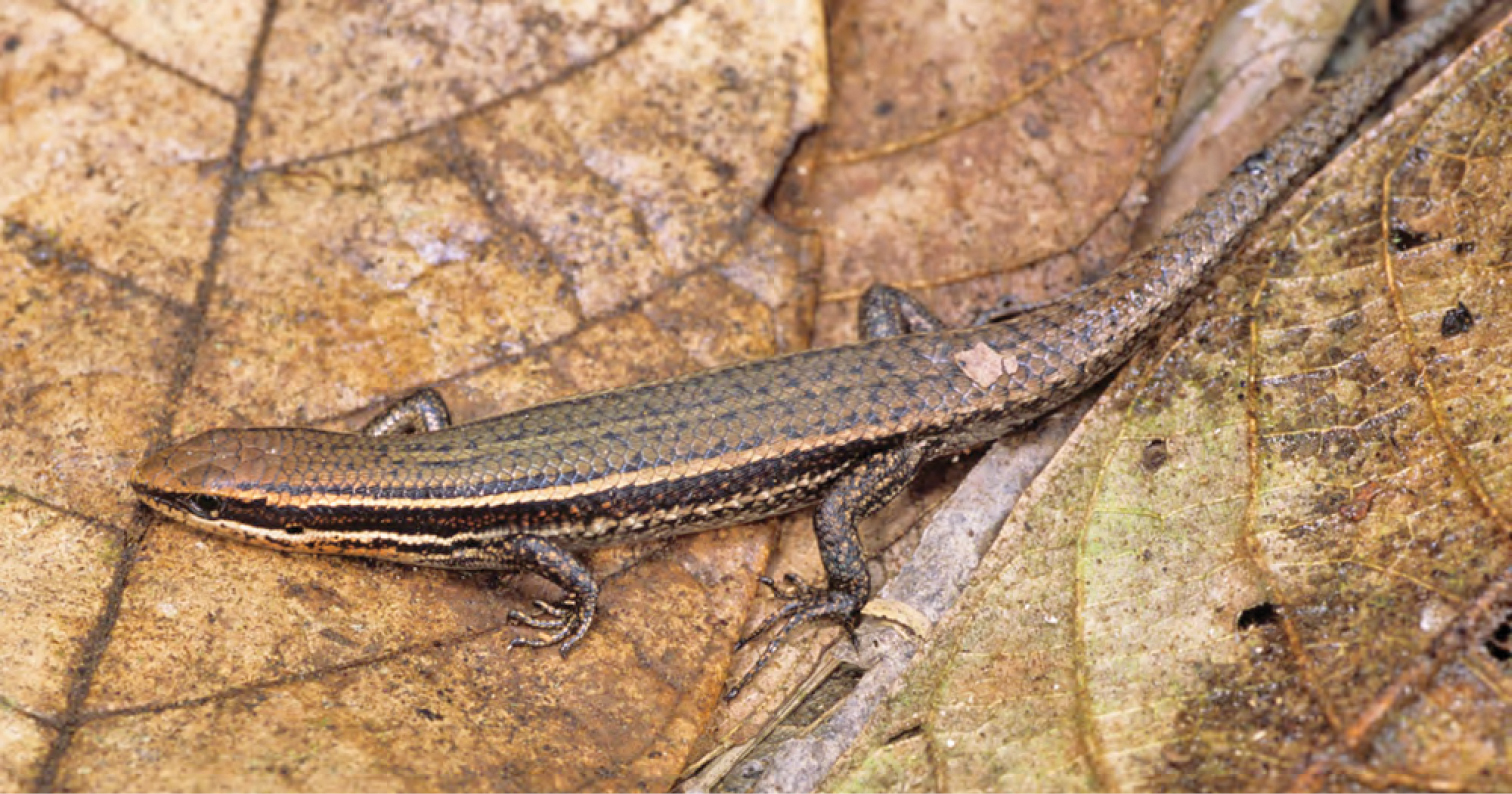

Conservation status
- Least Concern (IUCN 3.1)

Scientific classification
- Kingdom: Animalia
- Phylum: Chordata
- Class: Reptilia
- Order: Squamata
- Family: Scincidae
- Genus: Eutropis
- Species: E. cumingi

Binomial name
- Eutropis cumingi (W.C. Brown & Alcala, 1980)

Synonyms
- Mabuya cumingi W.C. Brown & Alcala, 1980; Eutropis cumingi — Mausfeld et al., 2002

= Eutropis cumingi =

Species of lizard

Eutropis cumingi, also known commonly as Cuming's eared skink, Cuming's mabouya, and Cuming's mabuya, is a species of lizard in the family Scincidae. The species is endemic to the Philippines.

== Etymology ==
The specific name, cumingi, is in honor of English naturalist, Hugh Cuming, who collected the holotype.

== Geographic range ==
E. cumingi is found in the northern parts of the Philippines (Luzon, Calayan, Camiguin, and Lubang) as well as in Orchid Island southeast of Taiwan.

== Habitat ==
The preferred natural habitats of E. cumingi are forest and shrubland, at altitudes from sea level to 900 m (3,000 ft).

== Diet ==
E. cumingi preys upon cockroaches and other insects.

== Reproduction ==
E. cumingi is oviparous. Clutch size is two eggs.
