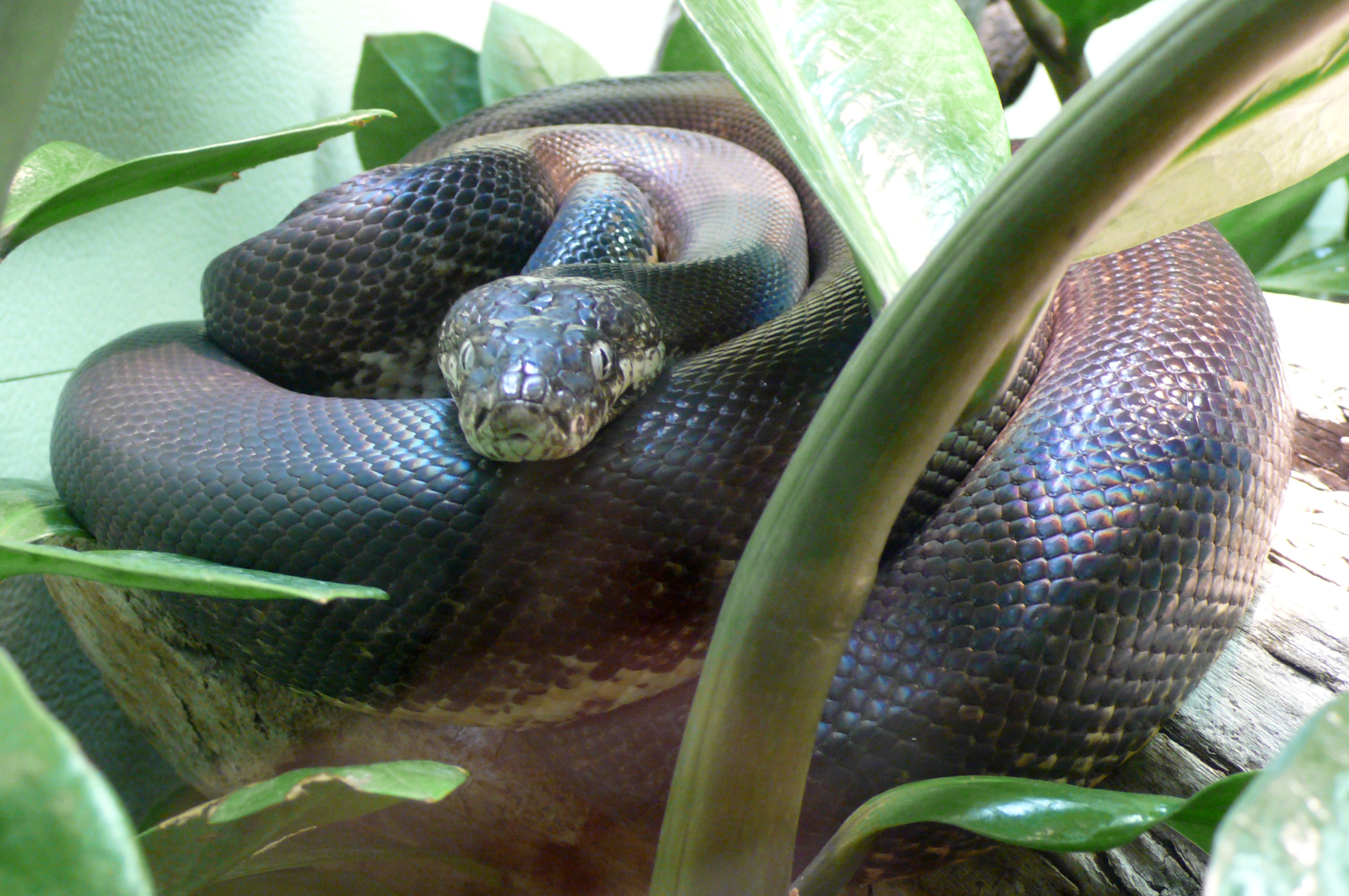
- Liasis mackloti savuensis

Conservation status
- Least Concern (IUCN 3.1)

Scientific classification
- Kingdom: Animalia
- Phylum: Chordata
- Class: Reptilia
- Order: Squamata
- Suborder: Serpentes
- Family: Pythonidae
- Genus: Liasis
- Species: L. mackloti

Binomial name
- Liasis mackloti A.M.C. Duméril & Bibron, 1844

Synonyms
- Liasis Mackloti A.M.C. Duméril & Bibron, 1844; Python timorensis S. Müller, 1844; Liasis (Simalia) Macklotii — Gray, 1849; Python timorensis — S. Müller, 1857; Liasis mackloti — Boulenger, 1893; Liasis Mackloti — F. Werner, 1897; Liasis macloti Barbour, 1912 (ex errore); Liasis mackloti mackloti — Stull, 1932; Liasis mackloti dunni Stull, 1932; Lisalia mackloti — Wells & Wellington, 1985; Morelia mackloti — Underwood & Stimson, 1990; Liasis mackloti — Kluge, 1993

= Liasis mackloti =

Species of snake

Liasis mackloti, commonly known as Macklot's python or the freckled python, is a species of python, a non-venomous snake in the family Pythonidae. The species is native to Indonesia, Timor-Leste, Papua New Guinea, and coastal northern Australia. Three subspecies are recognized, including the nominate subspecies described here.

== Etymology ==
The specific name, mackloti, is in honor of naturalist and taxidermist Heinrich Christian Macklot.

The subspecific name, dunni, is in honor of American herpetologist Emmett Reid Dunn.

== Description ==
Attaining 7 ft (2.13 m) or more in total length (tail included), Macklot's python is large and if not treated properly can be a poor-tempered snake. Its coloration consists of a blackish-brown to green base color, with yellow to ochre sides, and a white belly that is patterned with small and dispersed yellow spots or black speckles, while the labial scales are pale in color.

== Reproduction ==
Liasis mackloti is known to breed easily in captivity. It is oviparous.

== Geographic range ==
Liasis mackloti is found in Indonesia in the Lesser Sunda Islands of Savu, Roti, Samao, Timor and Wetar, in East Timor, Papua New Guinea, and coastal northern Australia. The type locality given is "les îles de Timor et de Samao ". Brongersma (1968) restricted the type locality to "Timor" by lectotype designation.

== Subspecies ==
Subspecies	Taxon author	Common name	Geographic range
L. m. mackloti	A.M.C. Duméril & Bibron, 1844	Macklot's python	Timor and Wetar, East Nusa Tenggara
L. m. dunni	Stull, 1932	Dunn's python
L. m. savuensis	Brongersma, 1956	Savu python	Savu, East Nusa Tenggara

== Exotic trade and captive care ==
Liasis mackloti is a snake that is known and sold in the live exotic animal trade, bringing it far beyond its native range, to as far as the United Kingdom, and North America, where it is sold and kept in captivity from pet stores, speciality shops, and conventions.

== Gallery ==
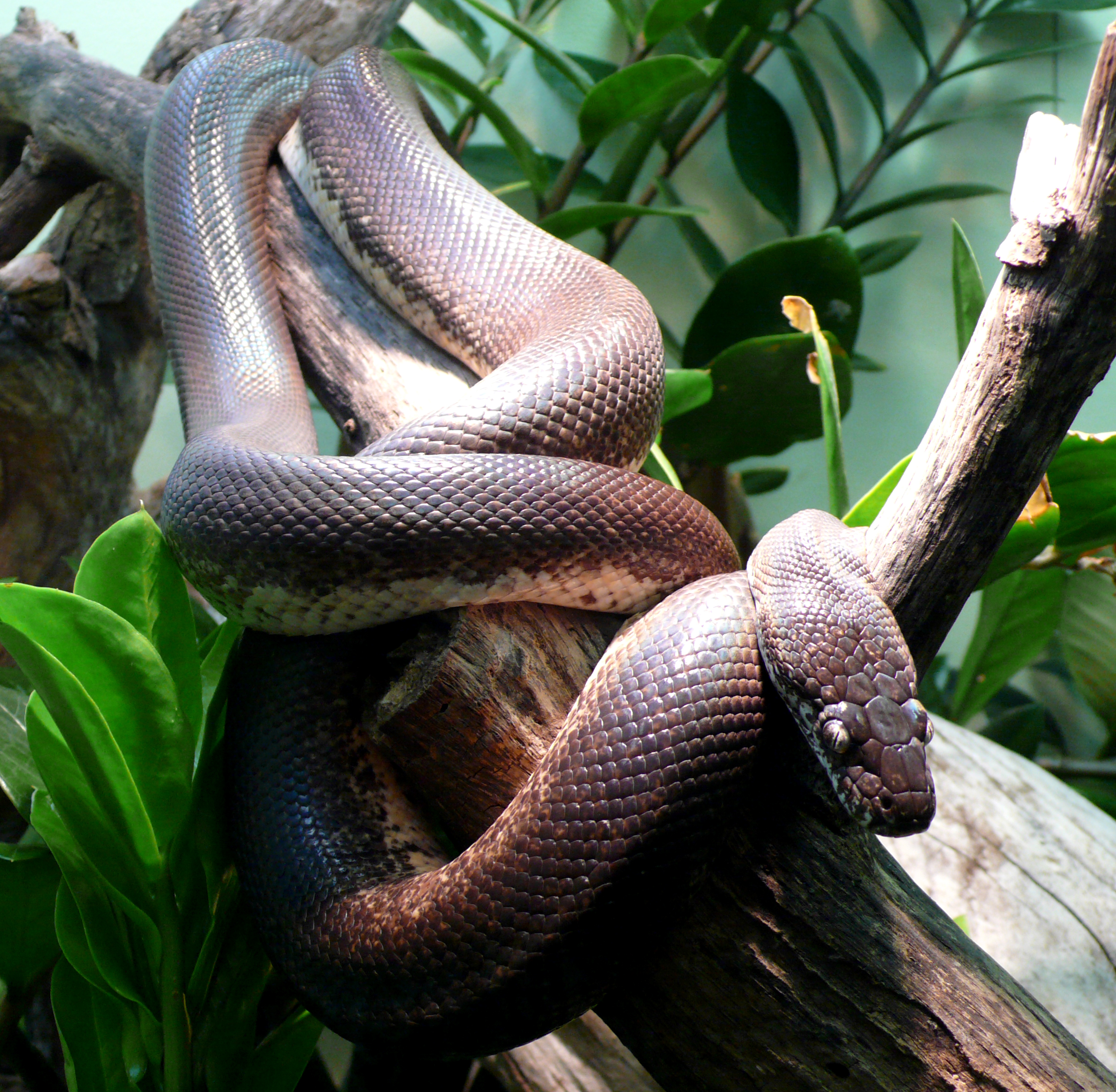

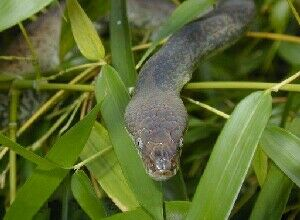

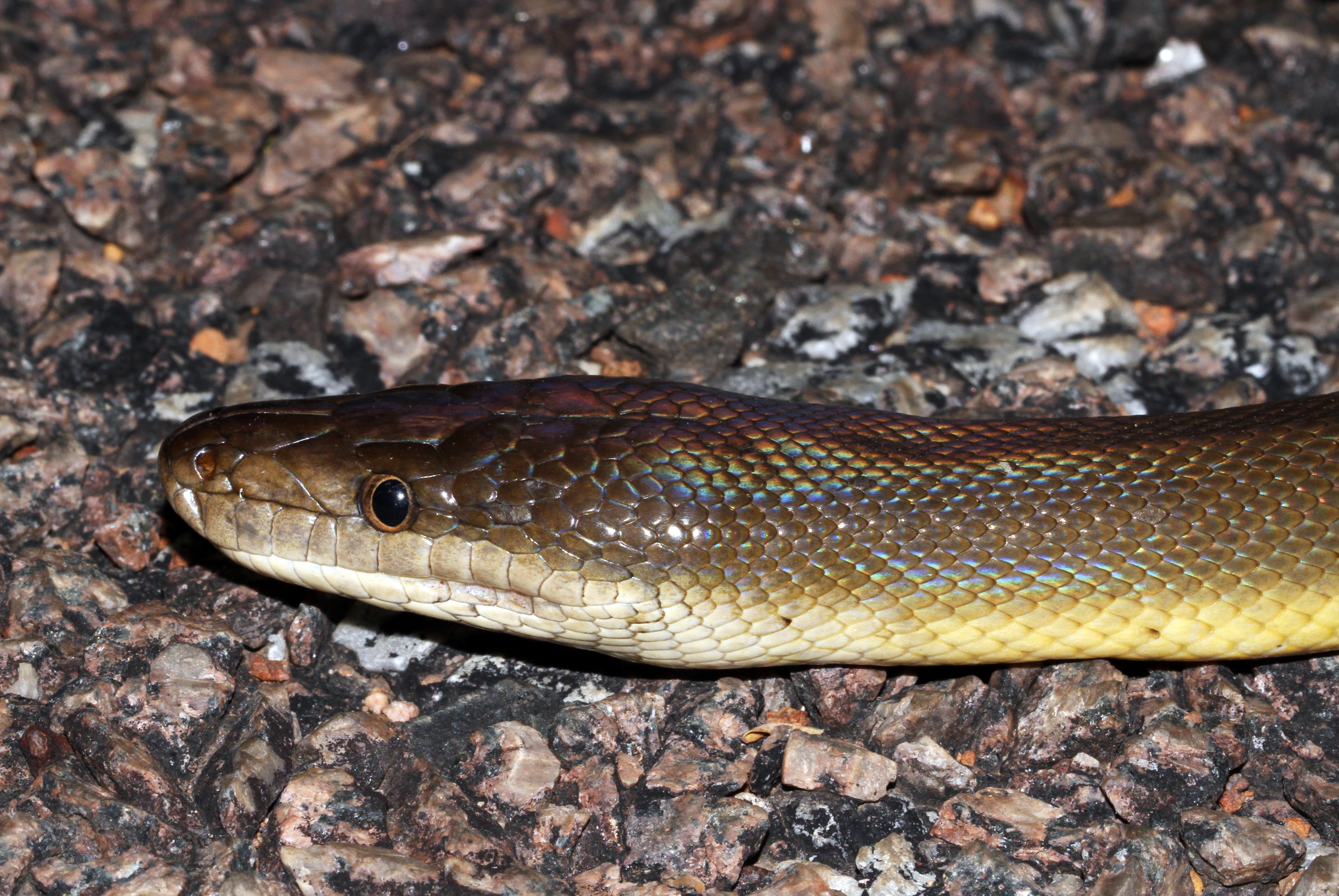

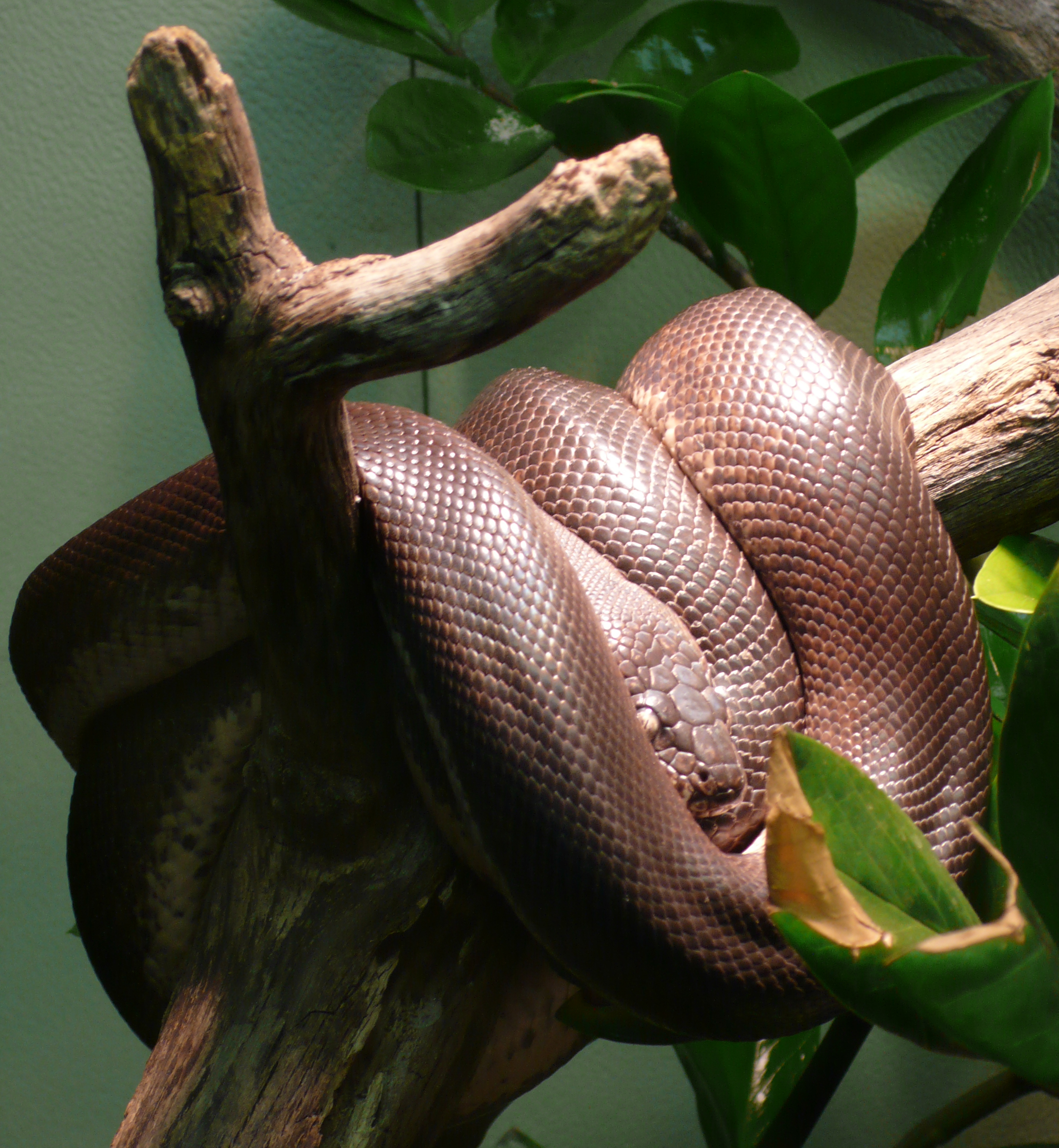

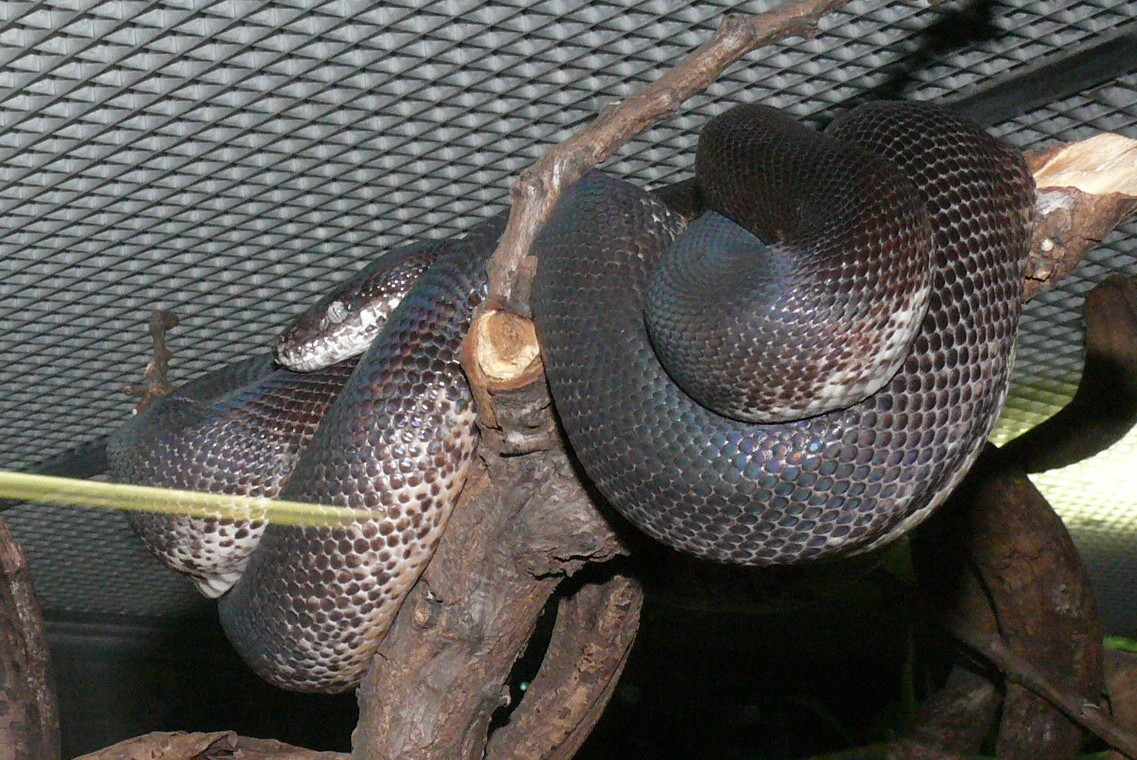
