= Striped blind snake =

Conservation status
- Least Concern (IUCN 3.1)

Scientific classification
- Kingdom: Animalia
- Phylum: Chordata
- Class: Reptilia
- Order: Squamata
- Suborder: Serpentes
- Family: Typhlopidae
- Genus: Ramphotyphlops
- Species: R. lineatus

Binomial name
- Ramphotyphlops lineatus (Schlegel, 1839)

Synonyms
- Typhlops lineatus; Typhlops lineata; Acontias lineatus; Pilidion lineatum; Typhlinahs lineatum; Typhlina lineata

Species of snake

The striped blind snake (Ramphotyphlops lineatus) is a species of snake in the Typhlopidae family. Once claimed as being extinct, it was rediscovered in the Bukit Timah Nature Reserve in Singapore after 172 years. The snake was found dead, and it was 4 cm longer than the previous maximum limit of the snake's length, 48 cm.
