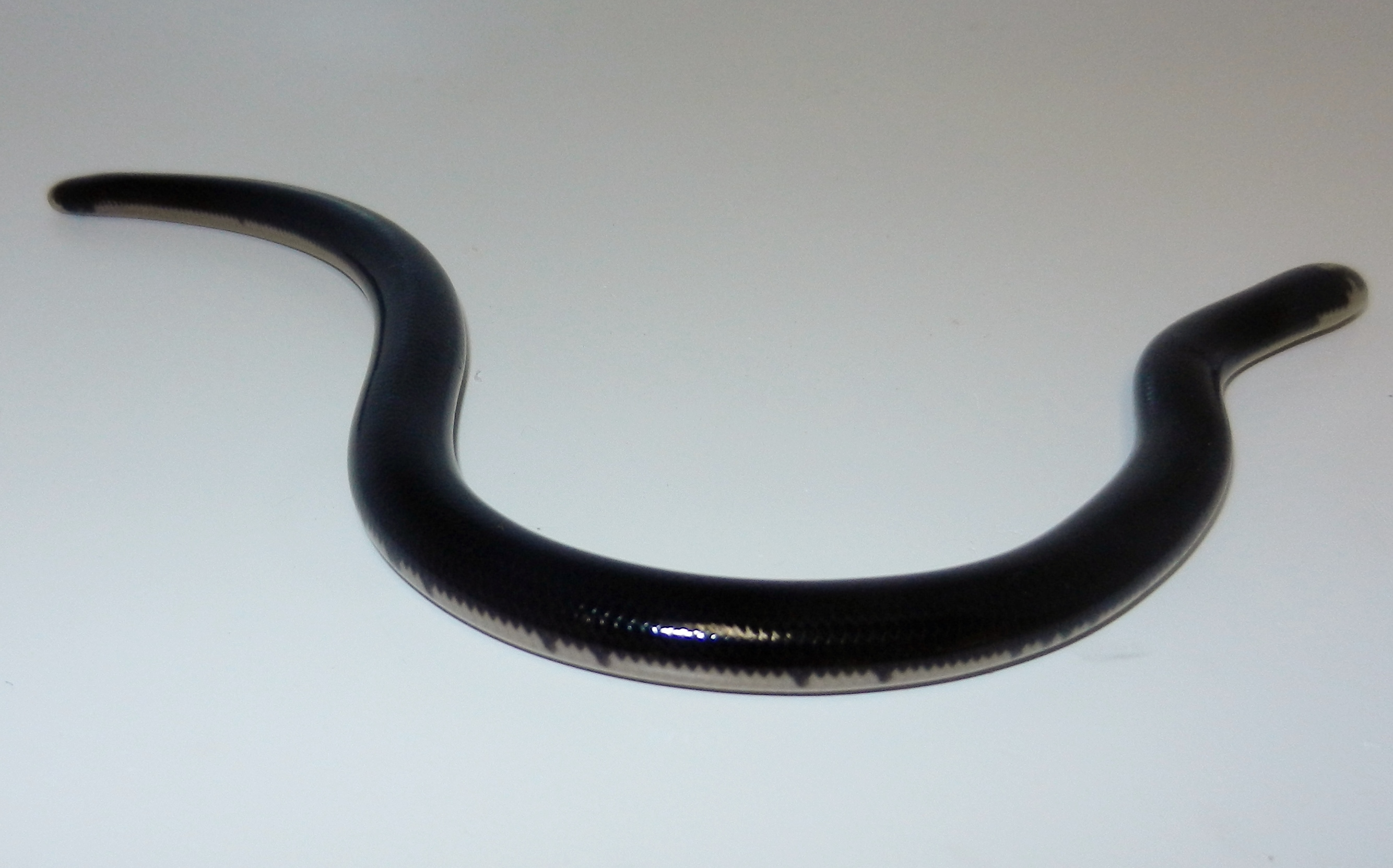

Conservation status
- Least Concern (IUCN 3.1)

Scientific classification
- Kingdom: Animalia
- Phylum: Chordata
- Class: Reptilia
- Order: Squamata
- Suborder: Serpentes
- Family: Typhlopidae
- Genus: Amerotyphlops
- Species: A. reticulatus

Binomial name
- Amerotyphlops reticulatus (Linnaeus, 1758)

Synonyms
- Anguis reticulata; Anguis rostralis; Anguis nasutus; Anguis crocotatus; Anguis rostratus; Typhlops leucogaster; Typhlops reticulatus; Agryrophis reticulatus; Ophthalmidion crassum; Typhlops lumbricalis var. troscheli; Altmantyphlops reticulatus

= Reticulate worm snake =

Species of snake

The reticulate worm snake (Amerotyphlops reticulatus) is a species of snake in the Typhlopidae family. The snake has been reported in Colombia, Peru, Bolivia, Brazil, the Guyanas and Venezuela.
