= Estado Falcón worm snake =

Conservation status
- Data Deficient (IUCN 3.1)

Scientific classification
- Kingdom: Animalia
- Phylum: Chordata
- Class: Reptilia
- Order: Squamata
- Suborder: Serpentes
- Family: Typhlopidae
- Genus: Amerotyphlops
- Species: A. lehneri

Binomial name
- Amerotyphlops lehneri (Roux, 1926)

Synonyms
- Typhlops lehneri Roux, 1926; Amerotyphlops lehneri — Hedges et al., 2014

Species of snake

The Estado Falcón worm snake (Amerotyphlops lehneri) is a species of snake in the family Typhlopidae. The species is endemic to Venezuela.

== Etymology ==
The specific name, lehneri, is in honor of geologist Ernst Lehner.

== Geographic range ==
A. lehneri is found in the Venezuelan state of Falcón.

== Habitat ==
The preferred natural habitat of A. lehneri is forest, at altitudes of 50–150 m (160–490 ft).

== Description ==
A. lehneri is a small species of blind snake. It has 20 scale rows around the body. Dorsally, it is yellowish with 11 brown lines. Ventrally, it is yellow. The rostral and the tail spine are bright yellow.

== Behavior ==
A. lehneri is terrestrial and fossorial.

== Reproduction ==
A. lehneri is oviparous.
