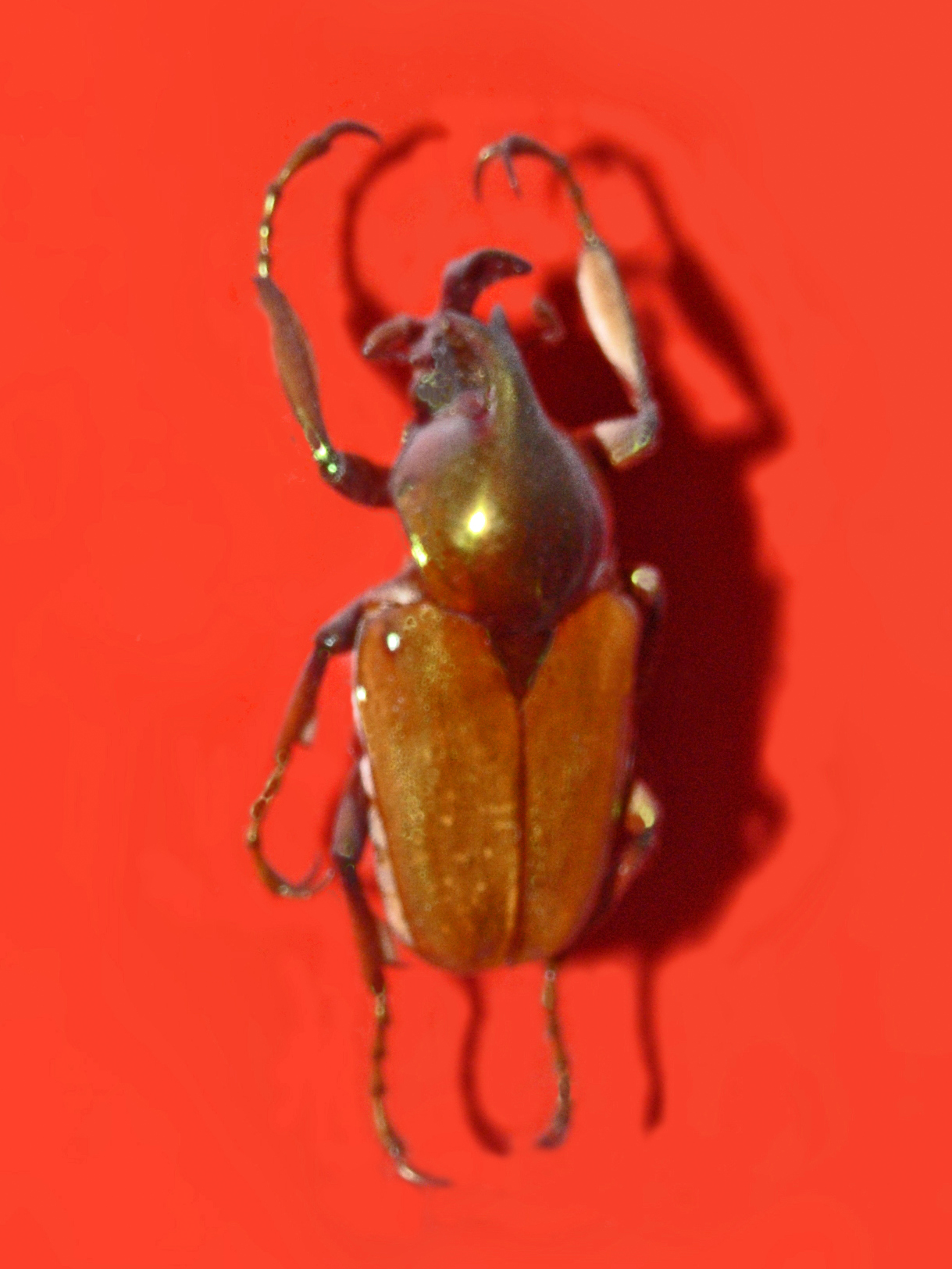
- Mounted specimen of Phaedimus cumingi

Scientific classification
- Kingdom: Animalia
- Phylum: Arthropoda
- Class: Insecta
- Order: Coleoptera
- Suborder: Polyphaga
- Infraorder: Scarabaeiformia
- Family: Scarabaeidae
- Subfamily: Cetoniinae
- Tribe: Phaedimini
- Genus: Phaedimus; Waterhouse, 1841

= Phaedimus =

Genus of beetles

Phaedimus is a genus of Asian beetles belonging to the family Scarabaeidae, subfamily Cetoniinae.

== Selected species ==
- Phaedimus cumingi (Waterhouse, 1841)
- Phaedimus zebuanus Mikšič 1972
