= Ramphotyphlops hatmaliyeb =

Scientific classification
- Kingdom: Animalia
- Phylum: Chordata
- Class: Reptilia
- Order: Squamata
- Suborder: Serpentes
- Family: Typhlopidae
- Genus: Ramphotyphlops
- Species: R. hatmaliyeb

Binomial name
- Ramphotyphlops hatmaliyeb Wynn, Reynolds, Buden, Falanruw & Lynch, 2012

Species of blind snake

Ramphotyphlops hatmaliyeb is a species of blind snake that is endemic to the Caroline Islands of Micronesia. The specific epithet hatmaliyeb is a transliteration of the Ulithian name for the snake.

== Distribution and habitat ==
The type locality is Giilab Island, Ulithi Atoll, in the Federated States of Micronesia. The snake normally lives beneath debris and rocks on the ground, though it has been recorded climbing Pisonia trees at night.
