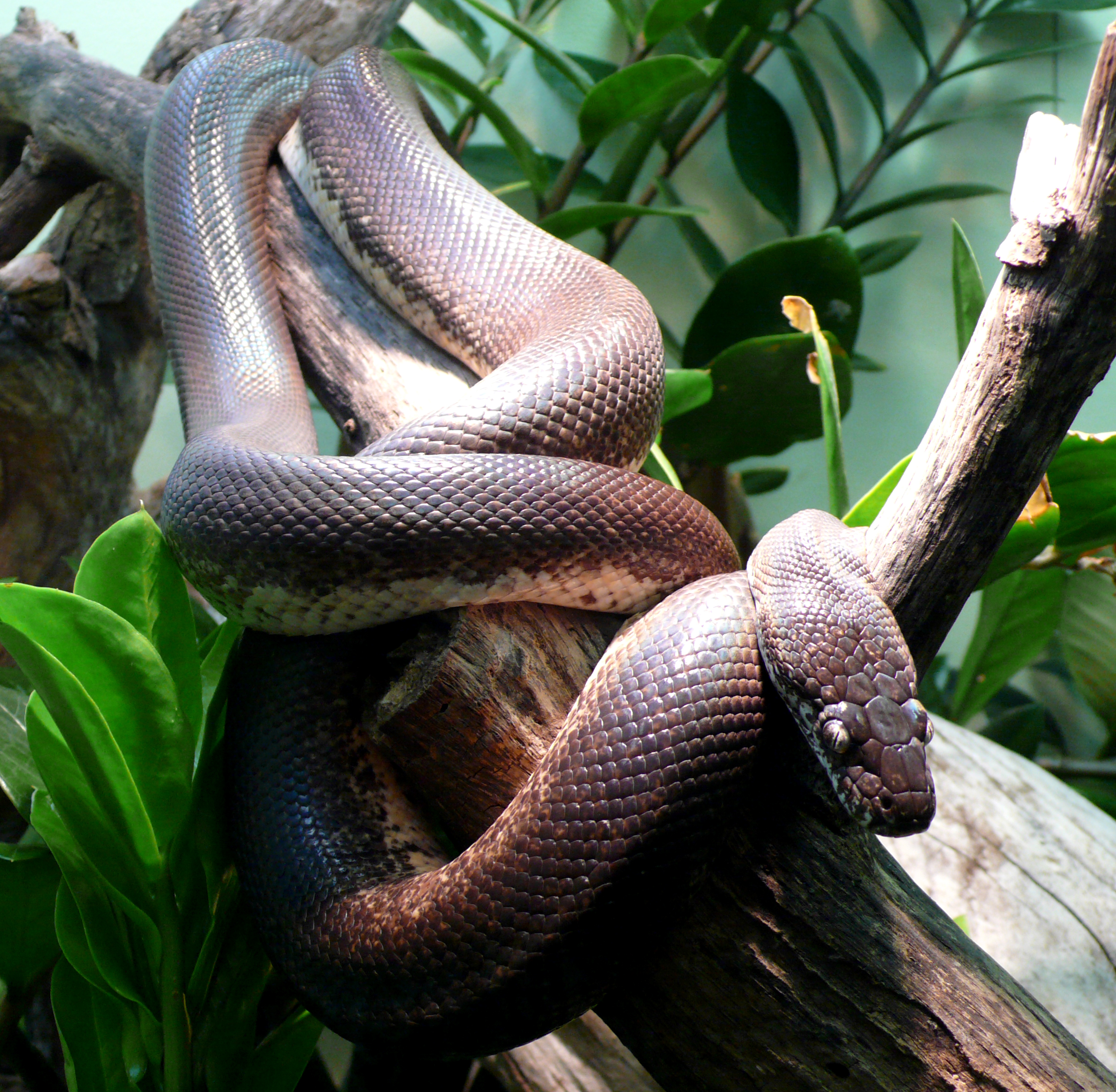

Conservation status
- Endangered (IUCN 3.1)

Scientific classification
- Kingdom: Animalia
- Phylum: Chordata
- Class: Reptilia
- Order: Squamata
- Suborder: Serpentes
- Family: Pythonidae
- Genus: Liasis
- Species: L. mackloti
- Subspecies: L. m. savuensis

Trinomial name
- Liasis mackloti savuensis Brongersma, 1956

Synonyms
- Liasis mackloti savuensis - Brongersma, 1956

= Liasis mackloti savuensis =

Subspecies of snake

Liasis mackloti savuensis, known as the Savu python, is a python subspecies found in Indonesia. It is known by the locals as sanca mata putih (white-eyed python).

== Distribution and habitat ==
The type locality given is "Savu Id." (=Sawoe, Indonesia).

== See also ==
- Daletvirus boae
