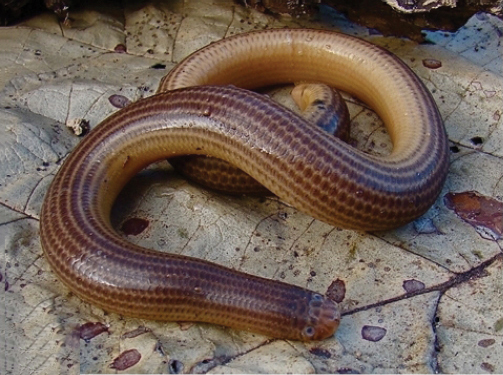

Conservation status
- Least Concern (IUCN 3.1)

Scientific classification
- Kingdom: Animalia
- Phylum: Chordata
- Class: Reptilia
- Order: Squamata
- Suborder: Serpentes
- Family: Typhlopidae
- Genus: Amerotyphlops
- Species: A. brongersmianus

Binomial name
- Amerotyphlops brongersmianus Vanzolini, 1976

Synonyms
- Typhlops brongersmai Vanzolini, 1972; Typhlops brongersmianus Vanzolini, 1976 (nomen novum); Amerotyphlops brongersmianus Hedges, 2014.

= Amerotyphlops brongersmianus =

Species of snake

Amerotyphlops brongersmianus, known commonly as Brongersma's worm snake or the South American striped blindsnake, is a species of harmless blind snake in the family Typhlopidae. The species is native to South America and Trinidad and Tobago in the Caribbean. No subspecies are currently recognized.

== Etymology ==
The specific name, brongersmianus, is in honor of Dutch herpetologist Leo Brongersma.

== Geographic range ==
A. brongersmianus is found in South America (and the Caribbean island of Trinidad) south through mainland South America (east of the Andes) as far as Buenos Aires Province in Argentina. In between it is also known to occur in Colombia, Venezuela, Guyana, Suriname, Peru, Brazil, Bolivia and Paraguay.

The type locality given is "Barra de Itaipe, Ilheus, Bahia [Salvador]", [Brazil].

== Habitat ==
The preferred natural habitats of A. brongersmianus are forest and savanna.

== Description ==
A. brongersmianus may attain a total length (including tail) of 32.5 cm (12.8 in). It has 20 scale rows around the body. The number of dorsal scales from the rostral scale to the terminal spine is, on average, 232.

== Diet ==
The diet of A. brongersmianus from a semideciduous forest in Central Brazil consisted of ants of all stages of development, while earlier studies also mention termites and unspecified insects.

== Reproduction ==
The species A. brongersmianus is oviparous.
