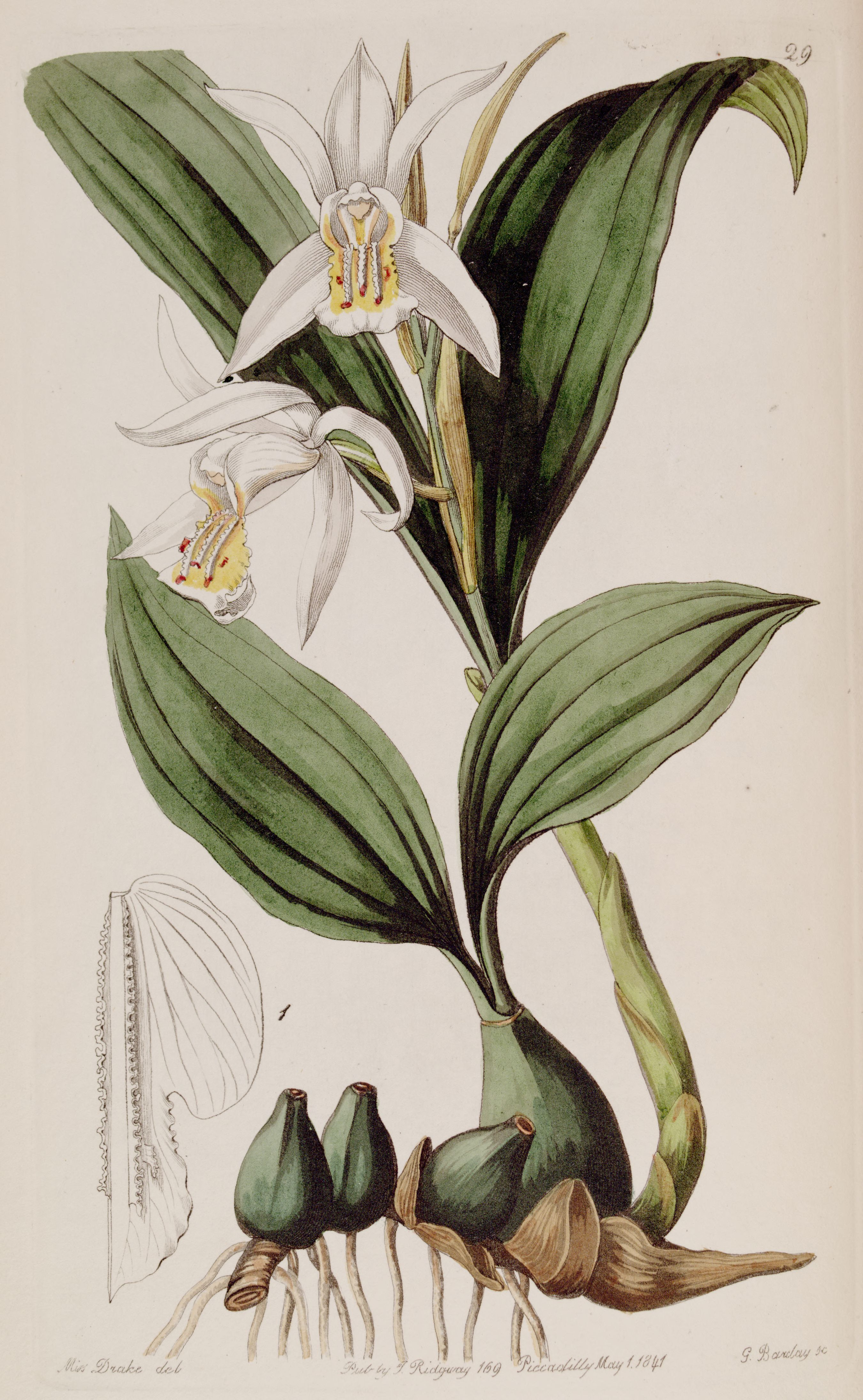

Scientific classification
- Kingdom: Plantae
- Clade: Tracheophytes
- Clade: Angiosperms
- Clade: Monocots
- Order: Asparagales
- Family: Orchidaceae
- Subfamily: Epidendroideae
- Tribe: Arethuseae
- Genus: Coelogyne
- Species: C. cumingii

Binomial name
- Coelogyne cumingii Lindl. (1821)

Synonyms
- Coelogyne longibracteata Hook.f. (1890); Pleione cumingii (Lindl.) Kuntze (1891); Pleione longibracteata (Hook.f.) Kuntze (1891); Coelogyne casta Ridl. (1897)

= Coelogyne cumingii =

Species of orchid

Coelogyne cumingii is a species of orchid. It is named after Hugh Cuming, the 19th century collector.
