= Yellow-bellied blind snake =

Conservation status
- Least Concern (IUCN 3.1)

Scientific classification
- Kingdom: Animalia
- Phylum: Chordata
- Class: Reptilia
- Order: Squamata
- Suborder: Serpentes
- Family: Typhlopidae
- Genus: Ramphotyphlops
- Species: R. flaviventer

Binomial name
- Ramphotyphlops flaviventer (Peters, 1864)

Synonyms
- Typhlops flaviventer

Species of snake

The yellow-bellied blind snake (Ramphotyphlops flaviventer) is a species of snake in the Typhlopidae family.
