= Conrad's worm snake =

Conservation status
- Data Deficient (IUCN 3.1)

Scientific classification
- Kingdom: Animalia
- Phylum: Chordata
- Class: Reptilia
- Order: Squamata
- Suborder: Serpentes
- Family: Typhlopidae
- Genus: Ramphotyphlops
- Species: R. conradi

Binomial name
- Ramphotyphlops conradi (W. Peters, 1875)

Synonyms
- Typhlops conradi W. Peters, 1875; Ramphotyphlops conradi — Hedges et al., 2014

Species of snake

Conrad's worm snake (Ramphotyphlops conradi) is a species of snake in the family Typhlopidae. The species is endemic to Indonesia.

== Etymology ==
The specific name, conradi, is in honor of German Captain Paul Conrad (1836 – ca. 1873).

== Geographic range ==
R. conradi is found on the island Sulawesi (formerly known as Celebes), Indonesia.

== Habitat ==
The preferred natural habitat of R. conradi is forest.

== Description ==
Dorsally, R. conradi is uniform brown; ventrally, it is lighter brown. The head and the tip of the tail are white. There are 18 scales around the body at midbody. The holotype measures 17.5 cm (6.9 inches) in total length (including tail).

== Behavior ==
R. conradi is terrestrial and fossorial.

== Reproduction ==
R. conradi is oviparous.
