= Loyalty Islands blind snake =

Conservation status
- Data Deficient (IUCN 3.1)

Scientific classification
- Kingdom: Animalia
- Phylum: Chordata
- Class: Reptilia
- Order: Squamata
- Suborder: Serpentes
- Family: Typhlopidae
- Genus: Ramphotyphlops
- Species: R. willeyi

Binomial name
- Ramphotyphlops willeyi (Boulenger, 1900)

Synonyms
- Typhlops willeyi Boulenger, 1900; Typhlina willeyi — McDowell, 1974; Ramphotyphlops willeyi — Bauer & Vindum, 1990

Species of snake

The Loyalty Islands blind snake (Ramphotyphlops willeyi) is a species of snake in the family Typhlopidae. The species is endemic to Melanesia.

== Etymology ==
The specific name, willeyi, is in honor of British-Canadian zoologist Arthur Willey.

== Geographic range ==
R. willeyi is found in the Loyalty Islands on Lifou and Maré, and on the island of New Caledonia.

== Habitat ==
The preferred natural habitat of R. willeyi is unknown, but the species is known to occur at an elevation of 150 m (490 ft).

== Description ==
The holotype of R. willeyi has a total length (including tail) of 19.5 cm (7.7 in). Its length is 32 times its diameter. Its color (in alcohol) is olive-brown dorsally, and yellowish ventrally. There are 22 scale rows around the body.

== Reproduction ==
R. willeyi is oviparous.
