= Papua bow-fingered gecko =

Conservation status
- Least Concern (IUCN 3.1)

Scientific classification
- Kingdom: Animalia
- Phylum: Chordata
- Class: Reptilia
- Order: Squamata
- Suborder: Gekkota
- Family: Gekkonidae
- Genus: Cyrtodactylus
- Species: C. papuensis

Binomial name
- Cyrtodactylus papuensis (Brongersma, 1934)

Synonyms
- Gymnodactylus arfakensis; Gymnodactylus papuensis; Gonydactylus papuensis

Species of lizard

The Papua bow-fingered gecko (Cyrtodactylus papuensis) is a species of gecko that is endemic to southern Papua New Guinea.
