= Ramphotyphlops suluensis =

Conservation status
- Vulnerable (IUCN 3.1)

Scientific classification
- Kingdom: Animalia
- Phylum: Chordata
- Class: Reptilia
- Order: Squamata
- Suborder: Serpentes
- Family: Typhlopidae
- Genus: Ramphotyphlops
- Species: R. suluensis

Binomial name
- Ramphotyphlops suluensis (Taylor, 1918)

Synonyms
- Typhlops suluensis Taylor, 1918; Ramphotyphlops suluensis Gaulke, 1995

Species of blind snake

Ramphotyphlops suluensis, also known as the Sulu Islands worm snake, is a species of blind snake that is endemic to the Philippines. The specific epithet suluensis refers to the type locality.

== Behaviour ==
The species is oviparous.

== Distribution and habitat ==
The type locality is Bubuan Island in the Tapian group of the Sulu Archipelago.
