= Marx's worm snake =

Conservation status
- Data Deficient (IUCN 3.1)

Scientific classification
- Kingdom: Animalia
- Phylum: Chordata
- Class: Reptilia
- Order: Squamata
- Suborder: Serpentes
- Family: Typhlopidae
- Genus: Ramphotyphlops
- Species: R. marxi

Binomial name
- Ramphotyphlops marxi (Wallach, 1993)

Synonyms
- Typhlops marxi Wallach, 1993

Species of snake

Marx's worm snake (Ramphotyphlops marxi) is a species of snake in the family Typhlopidae. The species is endemic to the Philippines.

== Etymology ==
The specific name, marxi, is in honor of American herpetologist Hymen Marx.

== Description ==
Ramphotyphlops marxi has 30 rows of scales around the body at midbody. Its snout has a horizontal transverse edge.

== Geographic distribution and habitat ==
Ramphotyphlops marxi is known only from the holotype, collected from Samar island in the central Philippines in 1957. It presumably originated from a forested habitat.

== Reproduction ==
Ramphotyphlops marxi is oviparous.
