= Arboreal blind snake =

Conservation status
- Data Deficient (IUCN 3.1)

Scientific classification
- Kingdom: Animalia
- Phylum: Chordata
- Class: Reptilia
- Order: Squamata
- Suborder: Serpentes
- Family: Typhlopidae
- Genus: Ramphotyphlops
- Species: R. angusticeps

Binomial name
- Ramphotyphlops angusticeps (Peters, 1877)

Synonyms
- Typhlops angusticeps; Typhlops olivaceus reduncus; Typhlina angusticeps

Species of snake

The arboreal blind snake (Ramphotyphlops angusticeps) is a species of snake in the Typhlopidae family. The ramphotyphlops angusticeps is a snake native to the Solomon Islands.
