= Leopold dtella =

Conservation status
- Data Deficient (IUCN 3.1)

Scientific classification
- Kingdom: Animalia
- Phylum: Chordata
- Class: Reptilia
- Order: Squamata
- Suborder: Gekkota
- Family: Gekkonidae
- Genus: Gehyra
- Species: G. leopoldi

Binomial name
- Gehyra leopoldi Brongersma, 1930

Synonyms
- Gehyra leopoldi Brongersma, 1930; Peropus leopoldi — Chrapliwy et al., 1961; Gehyra leopoldi — Wermuth, 1965

Species of lizard

The Leopold dtella (Gehyra leopoldi) is a species of gecko, a lizard in the family Gekkonidae. The species is native to Southeast Asia and Oceania.

== Etymology ==
The specific name leopoldi, is in honor of Leopold III, King of the Belgians.

== Geographic range ==
G. leopoldi is found in Indonesia and New Guinea.

== Reproduction ==
G. leopoldi is oviparous.
