= Ramphotyphlops becki =

Scientific classification
- Domain: Eukaryota
- Kingdom: Animalia
- Phylum: Chordata
- Class: Reptilia
- Order: Squamata
- Suborder: Serpentes
- Family: Typhlopidae
- Genus: Ramphotyphlops
- Species: R. becki

Binomial name
- Ramphotyphlops becki (Tanner, 1948)

Synonyms
- Typhlops becki Tanner, 1948; Ramphotyphlops becki Shea & Wallach, 2000

Species of blind snake

Ramphotyphlops becki, also known as Beck's blind snake, is a species of blind snake that is endemic to the Solomon Islands. The specific epithet becki honours zoologist D. Elden Beck of Brigham Young University, collector of the holotype.

== Behaviour ==
The species is oviparous.

== Distribution ==
The type locality is Guadalcanal.
