= Osbert Salvin =

English naturalist and ornithologist (1835–1898)

Osbert Salvin FRS
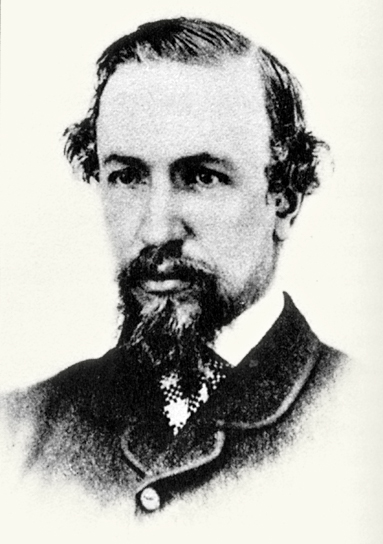
- Born: 25 February 1835; Finchley, England
- Died: 1 June 1898 (aged 63)
- Education: Trinity Hall, Cambridge
- Occupation: naturalist
- Known for: Godman-Salvin Medal
- Spouse: Caroline Octavia Maitland

Osbert Salvin FRS (25 February 1835 – 1 June 1898) was an English naturalist, ornithologist, and herpetologist best known for co-authoring Biologia Centrali-Americana (1879–1915) with Frederick DuCane Godman. This was a 52-volume encyclopedia on the natural history of Central America.

== Biography ==
Osbert Salvin was born in Finchley, north London, the second son of the architect Anthony Salvin, of Hawksfold, Sussex. He was educated at Westminster School and Trinity Hall, Cambridge, taking his degree in 1857. Shortly afterwards he accompanied his second cousin by marriage, Henry Baker Tristram, in a natural history exploration of Tunisia and eastern Algeria. Their account of this trip was published in The Ibis in 1859 and 1860.

In the autumn of 1857, he made the first of several visits to Guatemala, returning there with Frederick DuCane Godman in 1861. It was during this journey that the Biologia Centrali-Americana was planned.

In 1871 Salvin became editor of The Ibis. He was appointed to the Strickland Curatorship in the University of Cambridge, and produced his Catalogue of the Strickland Collection. He was one of the original members of the British Ornithologists' Union. He produced the volumes on the Trochilidae and the Procellariidae in the Catalogue of Birds in the British Museum. One of his last works was the completion of Lord Lilford's Coloured Figures of British Birds (1897).

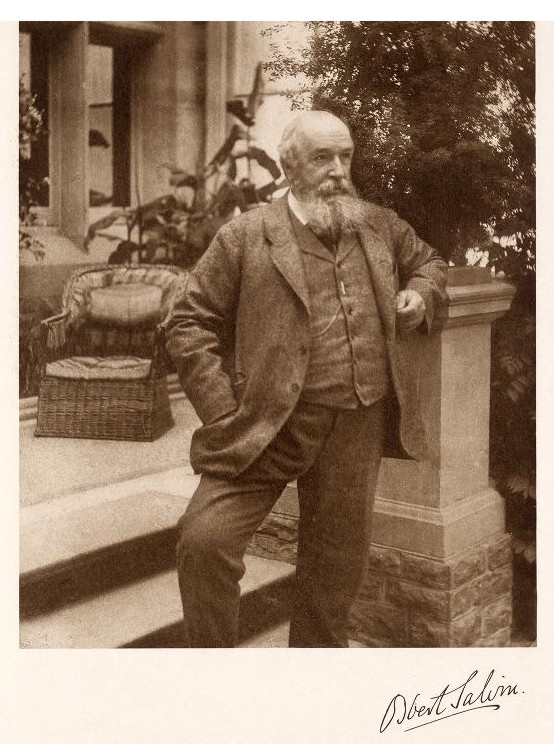

Salvin was elected to honorary membership of the Manchester Literary and Philosophical Society, in 1892, a Fellow of the Royal Society, the Linnean, Zoological and Entomological Societies, and at the time of his death was Secretary of the British Ornithologists' Union.

The Godman-Salvin Medal, a prestigious award of the British Ornithologists' Union, is named after him and Godman.

In the scientific field of herpetology, he described two new species of Central American reptiles: Bothriechis aurifer and Typhlops tenuis. Also, three species and one subspecies of reptiles have been named in his honor: Anolis salvini, Crotalus scutulatus salvini, Sceloporus salvini, and Staurotypus salvinii.

== Family ==
In 1863, he married Caroline Octavia Maitland in Loughton, Essex. They had three daughters, Sybil Maitland Salvin (born 1867), who married Edmund Leveson Calverley in 1893, Heloise Salvin (born 1875) and Viola Salvin (born 1878). Heloise Salvin married biologist John Edmund Sharrock Moore. Osbert's grandson is Ñāṇamoli Bhikkhu, a Theravada Buddhist monk and translator of Pali literature; he was originally also named Osbert after his grandfather.

== Sources ==
- Fisher, Clemency Thorne (2004). "Salvin, Osbert (1835–1898), naturalist". Dictionary of National Biography. Oxford Dictionary of National Biography (online ed.). Oxford University Press. doi:10.1093/ref:odnb/24586. (Subscription, Wikipedia Library access or UK public library membership required.)
- Mullens and Swann – A Bibliography of British Ornithology
- Papavero, Nelson; Ibáñez-Bernal, Sergio (2003). "Contributions to a history of Mexican dipterology.– Part 2. The Biologia Centrali-Americana". Acta Zoológica Mexicana (n.s.) 88: 143–232.
- Woodward, Bernard Barham (1901). "Salvin, Osbert" . In Lee, Sidney (ed.). Dictionary of National Biography (1st supplement). London: Smith, Elder & Co.
