= Hugh Cuming =

English collector

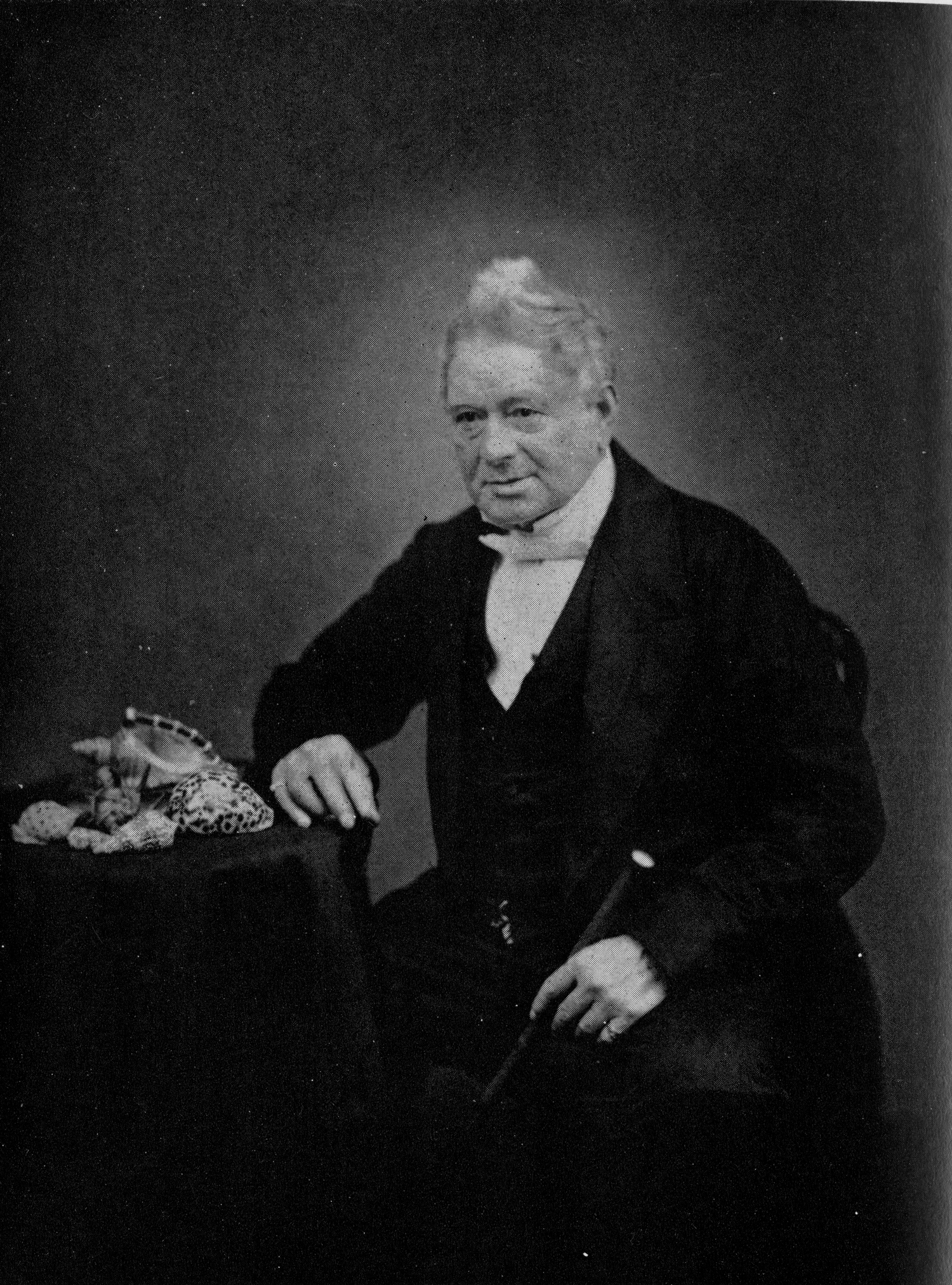
A portrait of Hugh Cuming late in his life, with shells of some tropical species of sea snails on the table next to him

Hugh Cuming (14 February 1791 – 10 August 1865) was an English collector who was interested in natural history, particularly in conchology and botany. He has been described as the "Prince of Collectors".

Born in England, he spent a number of years in Chile, where he became a successful businessman. He used the money he saved to buy a ship that was specifically built for collecting specimens, and travelled extensively on collecting trips amassing many thousands of specimens. After his death, much of his material was bought by the Natural History Museum in London. A number of species are named after him.

== Early life ==
Cuming was born at Washbrook, West Alvington in Devon to Richard and Mary Cuming, one of three children in a family of modest means. As a child he displayed an avid interest in plants and shells, and through his acquaintance with naturalist George Montagu, his love of natural history was encouraged and developed. At the age of thirteen he was apprenticed to a sailmaker. He met seafaring men who fired his imagination with their stories of remote ports and life at sea. Seeking adventure, in 1819 he shipped out on a voyage to South America, settling in Valparaíso, Chile.

== Collecting in Chile, Mexico and the South Pacific ==
In Valparaíso, he met Mr. Nugent, the British consul, and Lieutenant Frambly, a noted conchologist, who both stimulated and assisted him in shipping plants and shells back to England. The specimens were eagerly received, and returning ships brought increasing orders for exotic materials.

In 1826 Cuming gave up his business and completely devoted his time to collecting. For this purpose he commissioned a yacht to be built according to his own specifications. Christened The Discoverer, the yacht was designed expressly for the collection and stowage of objects of natural history. For nearly twelve months Cuming cruised among the islands of the South Pacific, dredging and collecting on sea and shore.

Consumed with the ambition to increase the collection of shells in the British Museum, he consigned numerous cases to that institution. He also sent many more cases of pressed plants and as much living material as possible to the botanical gardens of England.

Shortly afterward plans were made for an extended trip along the coast of Chile and the Pacific coast of Mexico. For two years he explored the Chilean coast, adding plants and shells from as far north as Acapulco, Mexico. Concluding the trip, Cuming returned to England.

== The Philippines ==
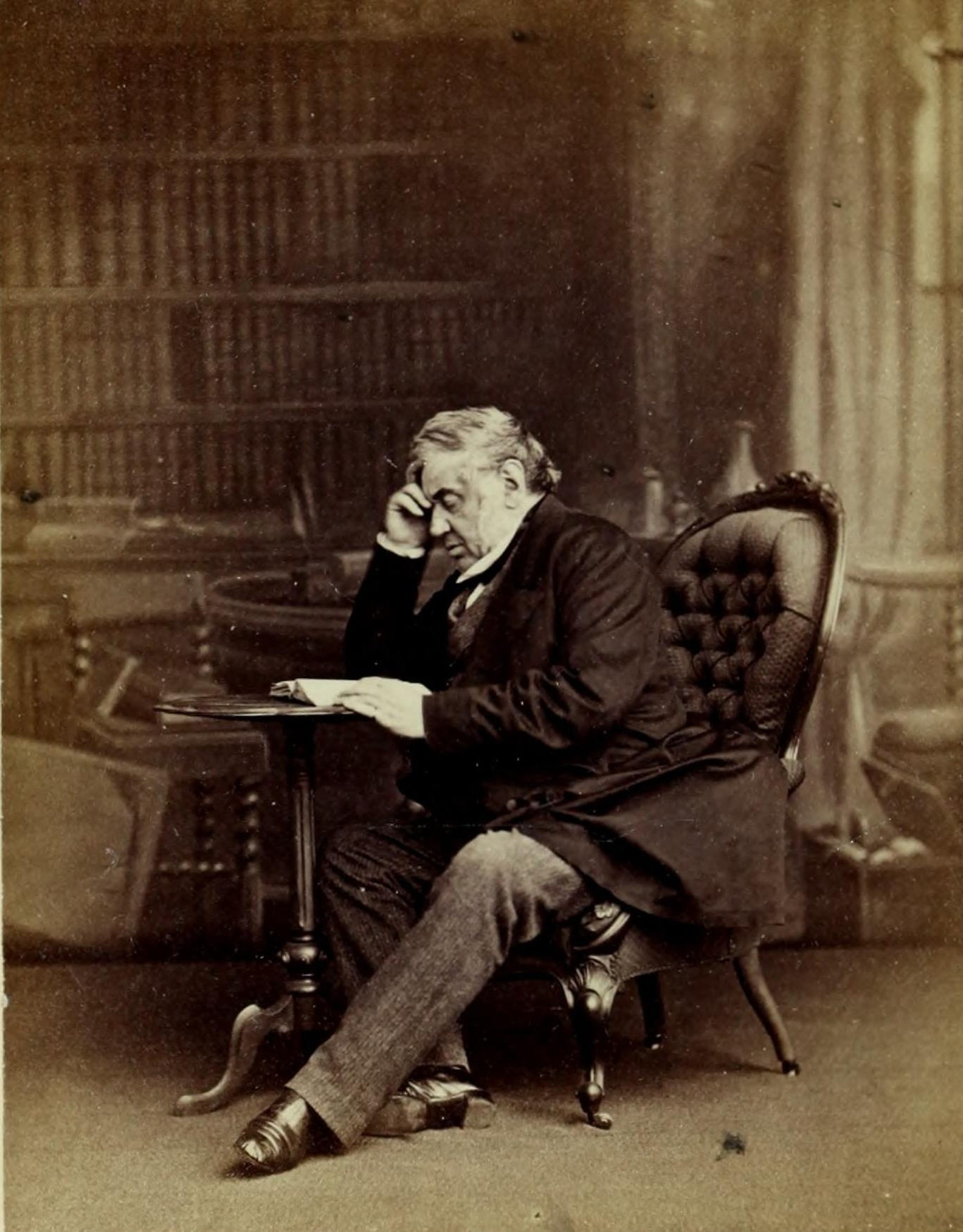

In 1835 he made ready for another exploration, this time to the Philippines. He continued to collect shells there but he also became interested in the rich and varied flora of the islands. In his four years of combing the Philippines, Singapore, St. Helena, and the Malacca areas, he collected magnificent series of the shells of land snails. He was aided greatly in these collections by hiring the services of local schoolchildren, who gladly scoured the wood and forests for plants and snails.

This enabled him to assemble the richest collection gathered by a single individual up to that time. It included 130,000 specimens of dried plant material, 30,000 conchological species and varieties, large numbers of birds, reptiles, quadrupeds and insects, and numerous living orchid plants, thirty-three of them species previously unknown to science. In the Philippine Journal of Science he is quoted as stating: "The greatest object of my ambition is to place my collection in the British Museum that it may be accessible to all the scientific world and where it would afford to the public eye a striking example of what has been done by the personal industry and means of one man." Toward this end, in later years he financed several collectors to carry on the same work.

His orchid discoveries were numerous, and he became the first to ship living orchids successfully from Manila to England. A number of orchids bear his name: Coelogyne cumingii, Podochilus cumingii, etc. The tree fern Cibotium cumingii is also named after Cuming.

Cuming is commemorated in the scientific names of five species of Philippine reptiles: Eutropis cumingi, Luperosaurus cumingi, Otosaurus cumingii, Ramphotyphlops cumingii, and Varanus cumingi. Additionally the scientific identifier of a bird, the Scale-feathered Malkoha , endemic to the northern provinces of The Philippines, carries Cuming's name: Dasylophus Cumingi.

== After his death ==
In 1866, after Cuming's death on August 10, 1865, the Natural History Museum of London purchased 82,992 of his specimens for £6,000. Many important conchological works were based on this collection, including Reeve's Conchologia Iconica (1843-1878, 20 volumes) and the Sowerby's Thesaurus Conchyliorum (1842-1887, five volumes).

Overall, Cuming collected approximately 130,000 herbarium specimens over his life. Botanical specimens collected by Cuming are held by the Moscow University Herbarium, the National Herbarium of the Netherlands, Royal Botanic Gardens, Kew, the Missouri Botanical Garden, the Geneva Botanical Garden, Harvard University Herbaria, Copenhagen University Botanical Museum, the New York Botanical Garden, the United States National Herbarium, National Museum of Natural History, France, and the National Herbarium of Victoria Royal Botanic Gardens Victoria.

== Standard author abbreviation ==
The standard author abbreviation Cuming is used to indicate this person as the author when citing a botanical name.
