= Leo Brongersma =

Dutch zoologist, herpetologist, author, and lecturer

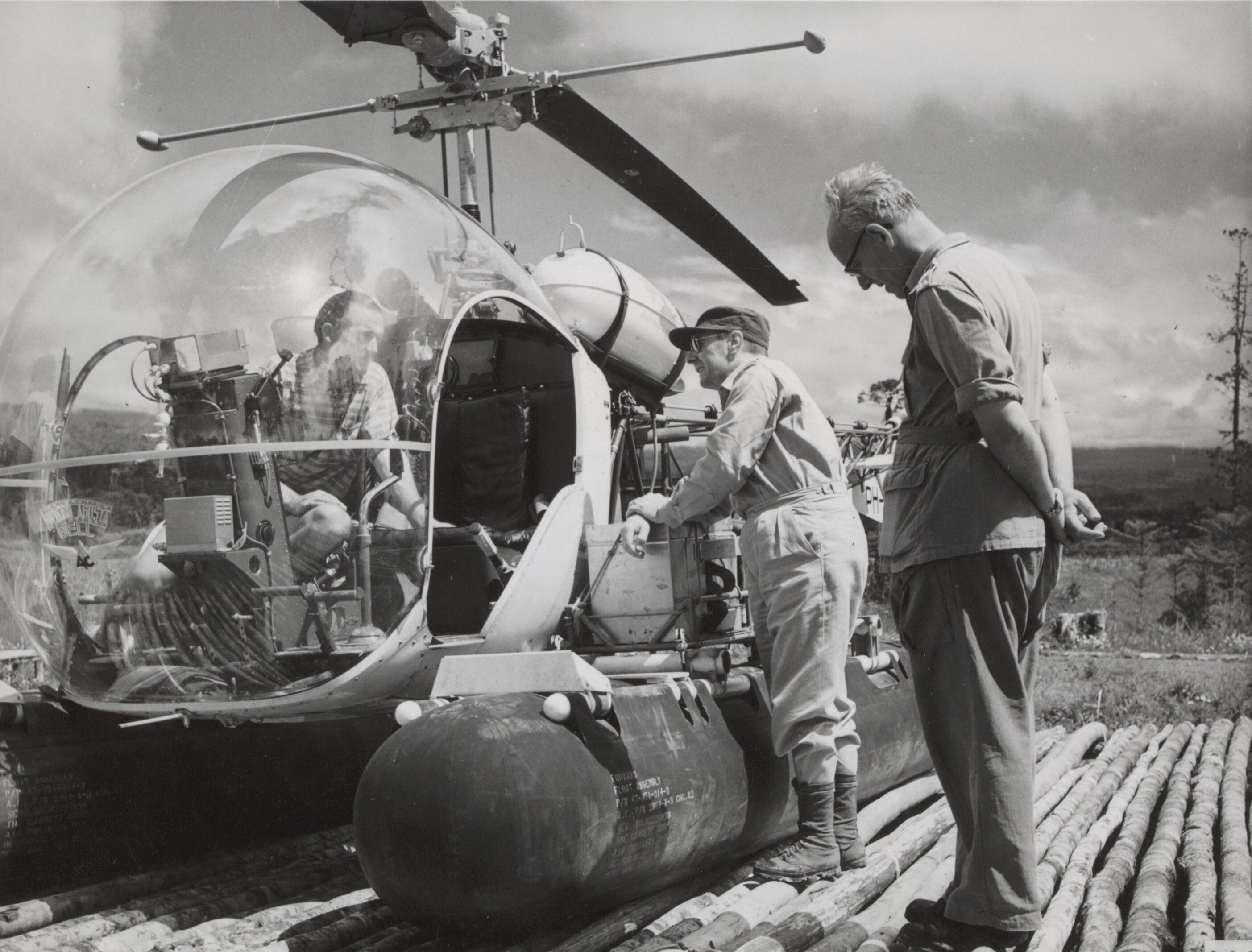
Brongersma (near the helicopter) in 1959

Leo Daniel Brongersma (17 May 1907 in Bloemendaal, North Holland – 24 July 1994 in Leiden) was a Dutch zoologist, herpetologist, author, and lecturer.

Brongersma was born in Bloemendaal, North Holland, and earned his PhD at the University of Amsterdam in 1934. He was probably best known for his scientific paper, "European Atlantic Turtles", which was published in 1972, but he also served as the director of the Natural History Museum, Leiden and lectured at Leiden University until he retired at age 65. In the 1950s he led several expeditions to collect zoological specimens in New Guinea. He described many new reptile species from the Indo-Australian Archipelago and New Guinea. He was also a Member of the Royal Netherlands Academy of Arts and Sciences since 1952 and an Honorary Foreign Member of the American Society of Ichthyologists and Herpetologists. He died at his home in Leiden in 1994.

== Amphibian and reptile taxa described by Brongersma ==
Species and subspecies are listed in the order they were described. Only species and subspecies still recognized are listed. A taxon author in parentheses indicates that the species or subspecies was originally described in a different genus.

- Gehyra leopoldi Brongersma, 1930 – Leopold's dtella
- Hemiphyllodactylus margarethae Brongersma, 1931 – Sumatran dwarf tree gecko
- Scinax proboscideus (Brongersma, 1933) – Gran Rio snouted treefrog
- Cyrtodactylus papuensis (Brongersma, 1934) – Papuan bow-fingered gecko
- Nactus vankampeni (Brongersma, 1934) – Van Kampen's bow-fingered gecko
- Ramphotyphlops similis (Brongersma, 1934) – Manokwari blindsnake
- Ramphotyphlops supranasalis (Brongersma, 1934) – Salawati blindsnake
- Typhlops koekkoeki Brongersma, 1934 – Bunyu Island blindsnake
- Sphenomorphus necopinatus Brongersma, 1942 – Bogor forest skink
- Sphenomorphus vanheurni (Brongersma, 1942) – Van Heurn's forest skink
- Cyrtodactylus deveti (Brongersma, 1948) – Moluccan bow-fingered gecko
- Tropidonophis multiscutellatus (Brongersma, 1948) – long-tailed keelback
- Lipinia venemai Brongersma, 1953 – Venema's moth skink
- Morelia boeleni (Brongersma, 1953) – Boelen's python
- Liasis mackloti savuensis Brongersma, 1956 – Sawu Island python
- Cryptophis boschmai (Brongersma & Knaap-van Meeuven, 1961) – Carpentaria whipsnake

== Amphibian and reptile species named in Brongersma's honour ==
Species are listed in the order they were described. Only species still recognized are listed.

- Phrynobatrachus brongersmai Parker, 1936 – Boulenger's African river frog
- Python brongersmai Stull, 1938 – Malaysian blood python, red blood python
- Litoria brongersmai (Loveridge, 1945) – Snow Mountains treefrog
- Calamaria brongersmai Inger & Marx, 1965 – Brongersma's reed snake
- Trimeresurus brongersmai Hoge, 1969 – Brongersma's pitviper
- Bufo brongersmai Hoogmoed, 1972 – Brongersma's toad
- Eremiascincus brongersmai (Storr, 1972) – Brongersma's night skink, Brongersma's tree skink
- Lobulia brongersmai (Zweifel, 1972) – Brongersma's highland skink, Brongersma's lobulia
- Amerotyphlops brongersmianus Vanzolini, 1972 – Brongersma's worm snake
- Tribolonotus brongersmai Cogger, 1973 – Admiralty crocodile skink, Brongersma's helmet skink
- Emoia brongersmai W. Brown, 1991 – Brongersma's emo skink
