= List of typhlopid species and subspecies =

This is a list of all genera, species and subspecies of the family Typhlopidae, otherwise referred to as typical blind snakes, or typhlopids. It follows the taxonomy currently provided by ITIS, which is based on the continuing work of Dr. Roy McDiarmid.

- Acutotyphlops
  - Acutotyphlops infralabialis
  - Acutotyphlops kunuaensis
  - Acutotyphlops solomonis
  - Acutotyphlops subocularis
- Cyclotyphlops
  - Cyclotyphlops deharvengi
- Ramphotyphlops, long-tailed blind snakes
  - Ramphotyphlops acuticaudus, Palau blind snake
  - Ramphotyphlops affinis
  - Ramphotyphlops albiceps
  - Ramphotyphlops angusticeps
  - Ramphotyphlops australis, southern blindsnake
  - Ramphotyphlops batillus
  - Ramphotyphlops bituberculatus
  - Ramphotyphlops braminus, brahminy blind snake
  - Ramphotyphlops broomi
  - Ramphotyphlops centralis
  - Ramphotyphlops chamodracaena
  - Ramphotyphlops cumingii
  - Ramphotyphlops depressus
  - Ramphotyphlops diversus
  - Ramphotyphlops endoterus
  - Ramphotyphlops erycinus
  - Ramphotyphlops exocoeti, Christmas Island blind snake
  - Ramphotyphlops flaviventer
  - Ramphotyphlops grypus
  - Ramphotyphlops guentheri
  - Ramphotyphlops hamatus
  - Ramphotyphlops howi
  - Ramphotyphlops kimberleyensis
  - Ramphotyphlops leptosomus
  - Ramphotyphlops leucoproctus
  - Ramphotyphlops ligatus
  - Ramphotyphlops lineatus
  - Ramphotyphlops lorenzi
  - Ramphotyphlops margaretae
  - Ramphotyphlops micromma
  - Ramphotyphlops minimus
  - Ramphotyphlops multilineatus
  - Ramphotyphlops nigrescens
  - Ramphotyphlops olivaceus
  - Ramphotyphlops pilbarensis
  - Ramphotyphlops pinguis
  - Ramphotyphlops polygrammicus
    - Ramphotyphlops polygrammicus brongersmai
    - Ramphotyphlops polygrammicus elberti
    - Ramphotyphlops polygrammicus florensis
    - Ramphotyphlops polygrammicus polygrammicus
    - Ramphotyphlops polygrammicus undecimlineatus
  - Ramphotyphlops proximus
  - Ramphotyphlops silvia
  - Ramphotyphlops similis
  - Ramphotyphlops supranasalis
  - Ramphotyphlops tovelli
  - Ramphotyphlops troglodytes
  - Ramphotyphlops unguirostris
  - Ramphotyphlops waitii
  - Ramphotyphlops wiedii
  - Ramphotyphlops willeyi
  - Ramphotyphlops yampiensis
  - Ramphotyphlops yirrikalae
- Rhinotyphlops
  - Rhinotyphlops acutus
  - Rhinotyphlops anomalus
  - Rhinotyphlops ataeniatus
  - Rhinotyphlops boylei
  - Rhinotyphlops caecus
  - Rhinotyphlops crossii
  - Rhinotyphlops debilis
  - Rhinotyphlops erythraeus
  - Rhinotyphlops feae
  - Rhinotyphlops gracilis
  - Rhinotyphlops graueri
  - Rhinotyphlops kibarae
  - Rhinotyphlops lalandei
  - Rhinotyphlops leucocephalus
  - Rhinotyphlops lumbriciformis
  - Rhinotyphlops newtonii
  - Rhinotyphlops pallidus
  - Rhinotyphlops praeocularis
  - Rhinotyphlops rufescens
  - Rhinotyphlops schinzi
  - Rhinotyphlops schlegelii
    - Rhinotyphlops schlegelii brevis
    - Rhinotyphlops schlegelii mucruso
    - Rhinotyphlops schlegelii petersii
    - Rhinotyphlops schlegelii schlegelii
  - Rhinotyphlops scorteccii
  - Rhinotyphlops simoni
  - Rhinotyphlops somalicus
  - Rhinotyphlops stejnegeri
  - Rhinotyphlops sudanensis
  - Rhinotyphlops unitaeniatus
  - Rhinotyphlops wittei
- Typhlops, Blind snakes
  - Typhlops andamanensis
  - Typhlops angolensis
  - Typhlops arenarius
  - Typhlops ater
  - Typhlops beddomii
  - Typhlops bibronii
  - Typhlops biminiensis
    - Typhlops biminiensis biminiensis
    - Typhlops biminiensis paradoxus
  - Typhlops bipartitus
  - Typhlops bisubocularis
  - Typhlops bothriorhynchus
  - Typhlops boulengeri
  - Typhlops brongersmianus
  - Typhlops canlaonensis
  - Typhlops capitulatus
  - Typhlops cariei
  - Typhlops castanotus
  - Typhlops catapontus
  - Typhlops caymanensis
  - Typhlops ceylonicus
  - Typhlops coecatus
  - Typhlops collaris
  - Typhlops comorensis
  - Typhlops congestus
  - Typhlops conradi
  - Typhlops costaricensis
  - Typhlops cuneirostris
  - Typhlops decorosus
  - Typhlops decorsei
  - Typhlops depressiceps
  - Typhlops diardii
  - Typhlops domergnei
  - Typhlops dominicanus
    - Typhlops dominicanus dominicanus
    - Typhlops dominicanus guadeloupensis
  - Typhlops elegans
  - Typhlops epactius
  - Typhlops exiguus
  - Typhlops floweri
  - Typhlops fornasinii
  - Typhlops fredparkeri
  - Typhlops giadinhensis
  - Typhlops gierrai
  - Typhlops gonavensis
  - Typhlops granti, Grant's blind snake
  - Typhlops grivensis
  - Typhlops hectus
  - Typhlops hedraeus
  - Typhlops hypogius
  - Typhlops hypomethes, coastal blindsnake
  - Typhlops hypsobothrius
  - Typhlops inornatus
  - Typhlops jamaicensis
  - Typhlops jerdoni
  - Typhlops khoratensis
  - Typhlops klemmeri
  - Typhlops koekkoeki
  - Typhlops koshunensis
  - Typhlops kraalii
  - Typhlops lankaensis
  - Typhlops lehneri
  - Typhlops leucomelas
  - Typhlops leucostictus
  - Typhlops lineolatus
  - Typhlops loveridgei
  - Typhlops lumbricalis
  - Typhlops luzonensis
  - Typhlops madagascariensis
  - Typhlops malcolmi
  - Typhlops manilae
  - Typhlops manni
  - Typhlops marxi
  - Typhlops mcdowelli
  - Typhlops microstomus
  - Typhlops minuisquamus
  - Typhlops mirus
  - Typhlops monastus
    - Typhlops monastus geotomus
    - Typhlops monastus monastus
  - Typhlops monensis, Mona blind snake
  - Typhlops mucronatus
  - Typhlops oatesii
  - Typhlops obtusus
  - Typhlops ocularis
  - Typhlops oligolepis
  - Typhlops pammeces
  - Typhlops paucisquamus
  - Typhlops platycephalus, flat-headed blindsnake
  - Typhlops platyrhynchus
  - Typhlops porrectus
  - Typhlops punctatus
    - Typhlops punctatus liberiensis
    - Typhlops punctatus punctatus
  - Typhlops pusillus
  - Typhlops reticulatus
  - Typhlops reuteri
  - Typhlops richardii, Richard's blind snake
  - Typhlops rondoensis
  - Typhlops rostellatus, Puerto Rican wetland blind snake
  - Typhlops ruber
  - Typhlops ruficaudus
  - Typhlops schmidti
    - Typhlops schmidti schmidti
    - Typhlops schmidti wilsoni
  - Typhlops schmutzi
  - Typhlops schwartzi
  - Typhlops siamensis
  - Typhlops socotranus
  - Typhlops steinhausi
  - Typhlops sulcatus, sulcate blind snake
  - Typhlops syntherus
  - Typhlops tasymicris
  - Typhlops tenebrarum
  - Typhlops tenuicollis
  - Typhlops tenuis
  - Typhlops tetrathyreus
  - Typhlops thurstoni
  - Typhlops tindalli
  - Typhlops titanops
  - Typhlops trangensis
  - Typhlops trinitatus, Trinidad worm snake
  - Typhlops uluguruensis
  - Typhlops unilineatus
  - Typhlops veddae
  - Typhlops vermicularis
  - Typhlops violaceus
  - Typhlops wilsoni
  - Typhlops yonenagae
  - Typhlops zenkeri
- Xenotyphlops
  - Xenotyphlops grandidieri
