= A. diversus =

A. diversus may refer to:

- Abacetus diversus, a ground beetle
- Acrolophus diversus, a synonym of Acrolophus kearfotti, a moth found in North America
- Anilios diversus, the northern blind snake, found in Australia
- Archichauliodes diversus, a fishfly found in New Zealand
- Attagenus diversus, a carpet beetle found in Africa
