= North-eastern blind snake =

North-eastern blind snake may refer to:

- Anilios torresianus
- Sundatyphlops polygrammicus
