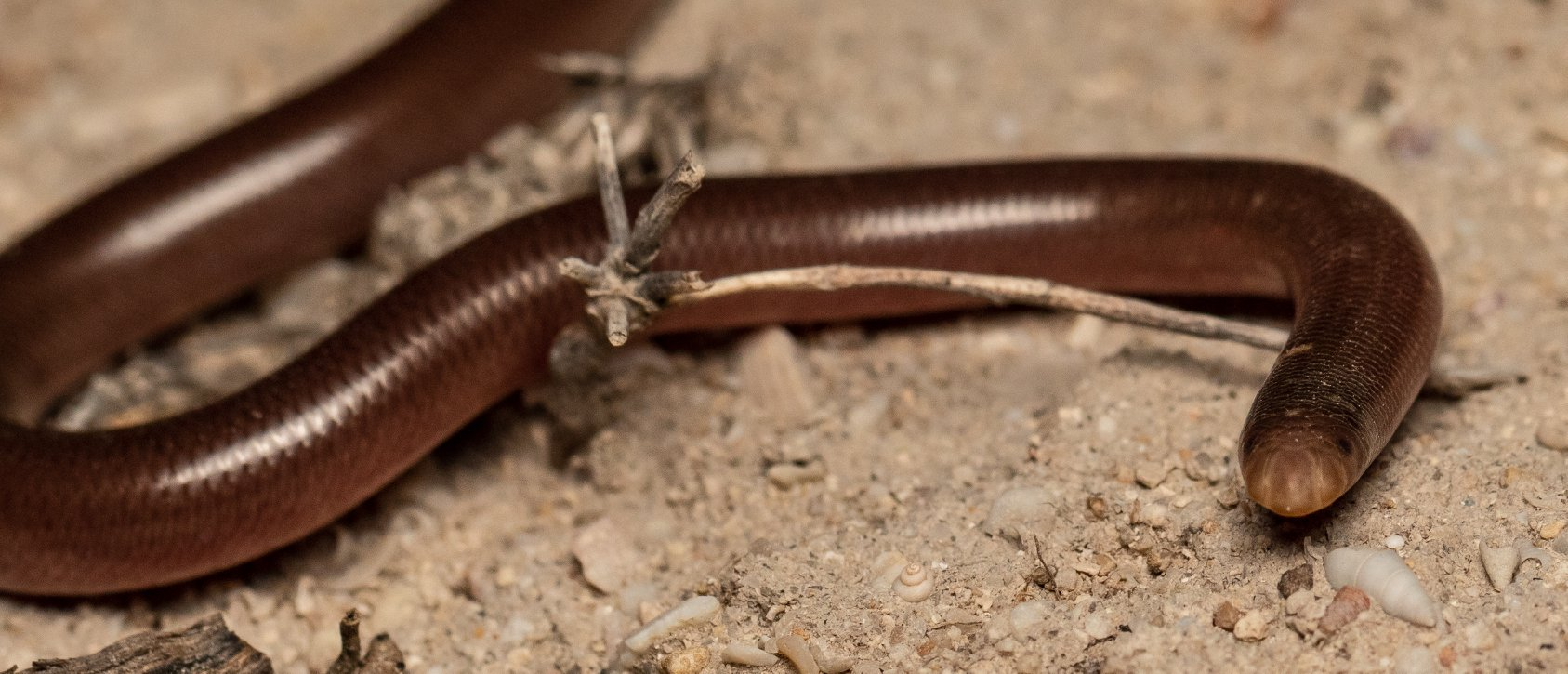
- Anilios bituberculatus

Scientific classification
- Kingdom: Animalia
- Phylum: Chordata
- Class: Reptilia
- Order: Squamata
- Suborder: Serpentes
- Family: Typhlopidae
- Genus: Anilios; Gray, 1845

Type species
- Anilios australis Gray, 1845

= Anilios =

Genus of snakes

Anilios is a genus of snakes in the family Typhlopidae, first described in 1845 by John Edward Gray.

== Geographic range ==
Species of the genus Anilios are found predominantly in Australia, with a few species located in New Guinea.

== Species ==
The following 48 species are recognized as being valid.

- Anilios affinis (Boulenger, 1889)
- Anilios ammodytes (Montague, 1914)
- Anilios aspina (Couper, Covacevich & S. Wilson, 1998)
- Anilios australis Gray, 1845
- Anilios batillus (Waite, 1894)
- Anilios bicolor (W. Peters, 1858)
- Anilios bituberculatus (W. Peters, 1863)
- Anilios broomi (Boulenger, 1898)
- Anilios centralis (Storr, 1984)
- Anilios chamodracaena (Ingram & Covacevich, 1993)
- Anilios diversus (Waite, 1894)
- Anilios endoterus (Waite, 1918)
- Anilios erycinus (F. Werner, 1901)
- Anilios fossor Shea, 2015
- Anilios ganei (Aplin, 1998)
- Anilios grypus (Waite, 1918)
- Anilios guentheri (W. Peters, 1865)
- Anilios hamatus (Storr, 1981)
- Anilios howi (Storr, 1983)
- Anilios insperatus Venchi, S. Wilson & Borsboom, 2015
- Anilios kimberleyensis (Storr, 1981)
- Anilios leptosoma (Robb, 1972)
- Anilios leucoproctus (Boulenger, 1889)
- Anilios ligatus (W. Peters, 1879)
- Anilios longissimus (Aplin, 1998)
- Anilios margaretae (Storr, 1981)
- Anilios micromma (Storr, 1981)
- Anilios minimus (Kinghorn, 1929)
- Anilios nema (Shea & Horner, 1997)
- Anilios nigrescens Gray, 1845
- Anilios obtusifrons Ellis & Doughty, 2017
- Anilios pilbarensis (Aplin & Donnellan, 1993)
- Anilios pinguis (Waite, 1897)
- Anilios proximus (Waite, 1893)
- Anilios robertsi (Couper, Covacevich & S. Wilson, 1998)
- Anilios silvia (Ingram & Covacevich, 1993)
- Anilios splendidus (Aplin, 1998)
- Anilios systenos Ellis & Doughty, 2017
- Anilios torresianus (Boulenger, 1889)
- Anilios tovelli (Loveridge, 1945)
- Anilios troglodytes (Storr, 1981)
- Anilios unguirostris (W. Peters, 1867)
- Anilios vagurima Ellis, 2019
- Anilios waitii (Boulenger, 1895)
- Anilios wiedii (W. Peters, 1867)
- Anilios yampiensis (Storr, 1981)
- Anilios yirrikalae (Kinghorn, 1942)
- Anilios zonula Ellis, 2016

Nota bene: A binomial authority in parentheses indicates that the species was originally described in a genus other than Anilios.
