= Anilios zonula =

Scientific classification
- Domain: Eukaryota
- Kingdom: Animalia
- Phylum: Chordata
- Class: Reptilia
- Order: Squamata
- Suborder: Serpentes
- Family: Typhlopidae
- Genus: Anilios
- Species: A. zonula

Binomial name
- Anilios zonula Ellis, 2016

Species of Australian blind snake

Anilios zonula, also known as the West Kimberley blind snake, is a species of blind snake that is endemic to Australia. The specific epithet zonula (“little belt”) refers to the slender appearance of the species.

== Description ==
The snake grows to about 19 cm in length. It is long and slender, purplish-pink to pale pink in colour. It lacks a tail-spine.

== Distribution and habitat ==
The species occurs in the West Kimberley region of north-west Western Australia. It has only been recorded from Storr and Augustus Islands, where specimens were collected from beneath sandstone rocks. The type locality is Storr Island.
