= Anilios splendidus =

Scientific classification
- Kingdom: Animalia
- Phylum: Chordata
- Class: Reptilia
- Order: Squamata
- Suborder: Serpentes
- Family: Typhlopidae
- Genus: Anilios
- Species: A. splendidus

Binomial name
- Anilios splendidus (Aplin, 1998)

Synonyms
- Rhamphotyphlops splendidus Aplin, 1998; Austrotyphlops splendidus Wallach, 2006

Species of Australian blind snake

Anilios splendidus, also known as the splendid blind snake, is a species of blind snake that is endemic to Australia. The specific epithet splendidus means “splendid” or “magnificent”.

== Description ==
The snake grows to an average of about 15 cm, and a maximum of 20 cm, in length. The upper body is dull grey, the belly white.

== Behaviour ==
The species is oviparous.

== Distribution ==
The species occurs at North West Cape in the Gascoyne region of Western Australia. The type locality is Milyering Well in the Cape Range National Park.
