= Top End blind snake =

Conservation status
- Least Concern (IUCN 3.1)

Scientific classification
- Kingdom: Animalia
- Phylum: Chordata
- Class: Reptilia
- Order: Squamata
- Suborder: Serpentes
- Family: Typhlopidae
- Genus: Anilios
- Species: A. guentheri

Binomial name
- Anilios guentheri (W. Peters, 1865)

Synonyms
- Typhlops (Onychocephalus) güntheri W. Peters, 1865; Typhlops guentheri — Boulenger, 1893; Ramphotyphlops guentheri — Robb, 1966; Typhlina guentheri — McDowell, 1974; Austrotyphlops guentheri — Wallach, 2006; Anilios guentheri — Hedges et al., 2014

Species of snake

The Top End blind snake (Anilios guentheri) is a species of snake in the family Typhlopidae. The species is endemic to Australia.

== Etymology ==
The specific name, guentheri, is in honor of German-born British herpetologist Albert Günther.

== Geographic range ==
In Australia, A. guentheri is found in the state of Western Australia and in Northern Territory.

== Habitat ==
The preferred natural habitat of A. guentheri is grassland.

== Description ==
A. guentheri is small and very slender. Its snout is rounded, not beaked. It has 18 rows of scales at midbody. Its head and body are pale reddish brown, and its tail is blackish.

== Reproduction ==
A. guentheri is oviparous.
