= Anilios australis =

Conservation status
- Least Concern (IUCN 3.1)

Scientific classification
- Kingdom: Animalia
- Phylum: Chordata
- Class: Reptilia
- Order: Squamata
- Suborder: Serpentes
- Family: Typhlopidae
- Genus: Anilios
- Species: A. australis

Binomial name
- Anilios australis Gray, 1845

Synonyms
- Anilios australis Gray, 1845; Onychocephalus verticalis A. Smith, 1846; Typhlops preissi Jan, 1860; Onychocephalus macrurus W. Peters, 1860; Typhlops australis — Boulenger, 1893; Ramphotyphlops australis — Robb, 1966; Typhlina australis — McDowell, 1974; Sivadictus australis — Wells & Wellington, 1985; Austrotyphlops australis — Wallach, 2006; Anilios australis — Wallach et al., 2014

Species of snake

Anilios australis, or the southern blind snake, is a species of snake in the family Typhlopidae. The species is endemic to Australia.

== Geographic range ==
A. australis is found in the following states and territories of Australia: New South Wales, Northern Territory, South Australia, Victoria, and Western Australia.

== Reproduction ==
A. australis is oviparous.
