= Brown-snouted blind snake =

Conservation status
- Least Concern (IUCN 3.1)

Scientific classification
- Kingdom: Animalia
- Phylum: Chordata
- Class: Reptilia
- Order: Squamata
- Suborder: Serpentes
- Family: Typhlopidae
- Genus: Anilios
- Species: A. wiedii

Binomial name
- Anilios wiedii (W. Peters, 1867)

Synonyms
- Typhlops wiedii W. Peters, 1867; Ramphotyphlops wiedii — Robb, 1966; Typhlina wiedii — McDowell, 1974; Ramphotyphlops wiedii — McDiarmid, Campbell & Touré, 1999; Austrotyphlops wiedii — Wallach, 2006; Ramphotyphlops wiedii — S. Wilson & Swan, 2010; Anilios wiedii — Hedges et al., 2014; Ramphotyphlops wiedii — Cogger, 2014

Species of snake

The brown-snouted blind snake (Anilios wiedii), also known commonly as Wied's blind snake, is a species of snake in the family Typhlopidae. The species is endemic to Australia.

== Etymology ==
The specific name, wiedii, is in honor of German naturalist Prince Maximilian of Wied-Neuwied.

== Geographic range ==
A. wiedii is found in the Australian states of New South Wales and Queensland.

== Habitat ==
The preferred habitats of A. wiedii are forests and savannas.

== Description ==
A. wiedii may grow to a total length (including tail) of 29 cm (11 in). It is brownish dorsally, and yellowish ventrally. The snout is very prominent, rounded, with the nostrils inferior. There are 20 rows of scales around the body. The body is slender, about 50 times as long as broad.

== Reproduction ==
A. wiedii is oviparous.
