= Anilios broomi =

Conservation status
- Least Concern (IUCN 3.1)

Scientific classification
- Kingdom: Animalia
- Phylum: Chordata
- Class: Reptilia
- Order: Squamata
- Suborder: Serpentes
- Family: Typhlopidae
- Genus: Anilios
- Species: A. broomi

Binomial name
- Anilios broomi (Boulenger, 1898)

Synonyms
- Typhlops broomi Boulenger, 1898; Ramphotyphlops broomi — Robb, 1966; Typhlina broomi — McDowell, 1974; Australotyphlops broomi — Wallach, 2006; Anilios broomi — Hedges et al., 2014

Species of snake

Anilios broomi, also known commonly as Broom's blind snake, the faint-striped blind snake, and the striate blind snake, is a species of non-venomous snake in the family Typhlopidae. The species is endemic to Australia.

== Geographic range ==
A. broomi is found in northeastern Queensland, Australia.

== Habitat ==
The preferred habitats of A. broomi are woodland, mallee, and arid and semi-arid areas.

== Reproduction ==
A. broomi is oviparous.

== Etymology ==
The specific name, broomi, is in honor of paleontologist Robert Broom.
