= Anilios aspina =

Scientific classification
- Domain: Eukaryota
- Kingdom: Animalia
- Phylum: Chordata
- Class: Reptilia
- Order: Squamata
- Suborder: Serpentes
- Family: Typhlopidae
- Genus: Anilios
- Species: A. aspina

Binomial name
- Anilios aspina (Couper, Covacevich & Wilson, 1998)

Synonyms
- Ramphotyphlops aspina Couper et al., 1998; Austrotyphlops aspina Wallach, 2006; Libertadictus aspina Hoser, 2012; Libertadictus (Buckleytyphlops) aspina Hoser, 2013; Anilios aspinus Wallach et al., 2014

Species of Australian blind snake

Anilios aspina, also known as the no-spined blind snake, is a species of blind snake that is endemic to Australia. The specific epithet aspina (“without spines”) refers to the snake's diagnostic lack of a terminal tail spine.

== Description ==
The species grows to an average of about 28 cm in length.

== Behaviour ==
The species is oviparous.

== Distribution and habitat ==
The snake inhabits the Mitchell Grass Downs of central Queensland. The type locality is Margot Station, some 20 km north of Barcaldine.
