= Anilios vagurima =

Scientific classification
- Domain: Eukaryota
- Kingdom: Animalia
- Phylum: Chordata
- Class: Reptilia
- Order: Squamata
- Suborder: Serpentes
- Family: Typhlopidae
- Genus: Anilios
- Species: A. vagurima

Binomial name
- Anilios vagurima Ellis, 2019

Species of Australian blind snake

Anilios vagurima, also known as the Mornington blind snake, is a species of blind snake that is endemic to Australia. The specific epithet vagurima (“wandering cleft”) refers to the diagnostic morphology of the cleft in the nasal scale.

== Description ==
The snake grows to about 32 cm in length. It is long and slender, with the upper body darker than the underside.

== Distribution and habitat ==
The species occurs in the Central Kimberley bioregion of north-west Western Australia. The type locality is Mornington Sanctuary. Habitat is open savanna woodland of Eucalyptus brevifolia, over a sparse cover of shrubs and tussock grasses, on red-brown clay-loam soils with scattered termite mounds.
