= Acutotyphlops banaorum =

Conservation status
- Data Deficient (IUCN 3.1)

Scientific classification
- Kingdom: Animalia
- Phylum: Chordata
- Class: Reptilia
- Order: Squamata
- Suborder: Serpentes
- Family: Typhlopidae
- Genus: Acutotyphlops
- Species: A. banaorum

Binomial name
- Acutotyphlops banaorum Wallach et al., 2007

Species of snake

Acutotyphlops banaorum is a species of snake in the family Typhlopidae. The species is endemic to the Philippines.

== Etymology ==
The specific name, banaorum, refers to the Banao, a tribe indigenous to northern Luzon island.

== Geographic range ==
Acutotyphlops banaorum is found in the province of Kalinga, which is on the island of Luzon, in the Philippines.

== Habitat ==
The preferred natural habitats of Acutotyphlops banaorum are forest, shrubland, and grassland.

== Behavior ==
Acutotyphlops banaorum is fossorial.

== Reproduction ==
Acutotyphlops banaorum is oviparous.
