= Proximus blind snake =

Conservation status
- Least Concern (IUCN 3.1)

Scientific classification
- Kingdom: Animalia
- Phylum: Chordata
- Class: Reptilia
- Order: Squamata
- Suborder: Serpentes
- Family: Typhlopidae
- Genus: Anilios
- Species: A. proximus

Binomial name
- Anilios proximus (Waite, 1893)

Synonyms
- Typhlops proximus; Ramphotyphlops proximus; Typhlina proxima; Austrotyphlops proximus

Species of snake

The Proximus blind snake or the woodland blind snake (Anilios proximus) is a species of snake in the Typhlopidae family that is native to eastern Australia.

== Description ==
It has an average length of 50 cm, but can reach 75 cm. It is dark brown and glossy in appearance with very small eyes, a bluntly trilobed snout, 20 mid-body scales and no noticeable head. They can often be mistaken for earthworms.

== Distribution ==
It is found in eastern Queensland, New South Wales, northern Victoria and eastern South Australia. Predominately nocturnal and non-venomous, it is a burrowing snake which spends most of its life beneath leaf litter or underground. It is rarely seen in daytime, but would make incidental appearances after heavy rainfall or warm moist nights using rocks and debris for shelter.

== Feeding ==
It mostly feeds on termites, larvae and pupae of ants, and small insects.
