= Anilios systenos =

Scientific classification
- Kingdom: Animalia
- Phylum: Chordata
- Order: Squamata
- Suborder: Serpentes
- Family: Typhlopidae
- Genus: Anilios
- Species: A. systenos

Binomial name
- Anilios systenos Ellis & Doughty, 2017

Species of Australian blind snake

Anilios systenos, also known as the sharp-snouted blind snake, is a species of blind snake that is endemic to Australia. The specific epithet systenos “tapering to a point” refers to the shape of head and snout.

== Description ==
The snake grows to an average of about 27 cm in length. The long, slender body is unpigmented, with the upperparts slightly darker than the underparts.

== Behaviour ==
The species is oviparous.

== Distribution ==
The species occurs in the Geraldton Sandplains bioregion of the Mid West region of Western Australia. The type locality is 15 km east of Geraldton.
