= Anilios longissimus =

Scientific classification
- Kingdom: Animalia
- Phylum: Chordata
- Class: Reptilia
- Order: Squamata
- Suborder: Serpentes
- Family: Typhlopidae
- Genus: Anilios
- Species: A. longissimus

Binomial name
- Anilios longissimus (Aplin, 1998)

Synonyms
- Rhamphotyphlops longissimus Aplin, 1998; Ramphotyphlops longissimus Cogger, 2000; Austrotyphlops longissimus Wallach, 2006

Species of Australian blind snake

Anilios longissimus, also known as the extremely long blind snake, is a species of blind snake that is endemic to Australia. The specific epithet longissimus (“extremely long”) refers to the snake's size and appearance.

== Description ==
The snake grows to an average of about 27 cm in length. The body is unpigmented and appears almost translucent.

== Behaviour ==
The species is oviparous.

== Distribution and habitat ==
The species is known only from Barrow Island, some 50 km off the Pilbara coast of north-western Western Australia. The snake's habitat is subterranean, with the holotype specimen recovered from a well-casing raised from a considerable depth during drilling operations. The type locality on the island is Bandicoot Bay.
