= Anilios robertsi =

Scientific classification
- Kingdom: Animalia
- Phylum: Chordata
- Class: Reptilia
- Order: Squamata
- Suborder: Serpentes
- Family: Typhlopidae
- Genus: Anilios
- Species: A. robertsi

Binomial name
- Anilios robertsi (Couper, Covacevich & Wilson, 1998)

Synonyms
- Ramphotyphlops robertsi Couper, Covacevich & Wilson, 1998; Austrotyphlops robertsi Wallach, 2006

Species of Australian blind snake

Anilios robertsi, also known as Roberts' blind snake, is a species of blind snake that is endemic to Queensland, Australia. It was first described in 1998 by Patrick Couper, Jeanette Covacevich and Steve Wilson as Ramphotyphlops robertsi. The specific epithet robertsi honours naturalist Lewis Roberts, an honorary consultant of the Queensland Museum and collector of the holotype specimen.

== Description ==
The snake grows to about 29 cm in length. The upper body is purplish-brown, the belly white.

== Behaviour ==
The species is oviparous.

== Distribution ==
The species occurs in the south-eastern Cape York Peninsula in the wet tropics of Far North Queensland. The habitat is open forest dominated by blue gum, brown bloodwood and yellow stringybark. The type locality is Romeo Creek, near Shipton's Flat, some 45 km south of Cooktown.
