= Anilios ganei =

Conservation status
- Least Concern (IUCN 3.1)

Scientific classification
- Kingdom: Animalia
- Phylum: Chordata
- Class: Reptilia
- Order: Squamata
- Suborder: Serpentes
- Family: Typhlopidae
- Genus: Anilios
- Species: A. ganei

Binomial name
- Anilios ganei (Aplin, 1998)

Synonyms
- Rhamphotyphlops ganei Aplin, 1998; Ramphotyphlops ganei — Cogger, 2000; Austrotyphlops ganei — Wallach, 2006; Anilios ganei — Hedges et al., 2014

Species of Australian blind snake

Anilios ganei, also known commonly as Gane's blind snake, is a species of snake in the family Typhlopidae. The species is endemic to Australia.

== Etymology ==
The specific epithet, ganei, honours Australian schoolteacher and amateur herpetologist Mr. Lori Gane who collected the first known specimen in 1991.

== Description ==
A. ganei grows to a total length (including tail) of about 30 cm (12 in). The upper body is a deep grey-brown, and the belly is cream.

== Behaviour ==
A. ganei is terrestrial and fossorial.

== Reproduction ==
A. ganei is oviparous.

== Geographic distribution ==
A. ganei is found in the Pilbara region of north-western Western Australia. The type locality is Cathedral Gorge, 30 km [18.6 miles] west of Newman.

== Habitat ==
The preferred natural habitat of A. ganei is grassland.
