= Anilios ammodytes =

Scientific classification
- Domain: Eukaryota
- Kingdom: Animalia
- Phylum: Chordata
- Class: Reptilia
- Order: Squamata
- Suborder: Serpentes
- Family: Typhlopidae
- Genus: Anilios
- Species: A. ammodytes

Binomial name
- Anilios ammodytes (Montague, 1914)

Synonyms
- Typhlops ammodytes Montague, 1914; Typhlops diversus Waite, 1918; Ramphotyphlops diversus ammodytes Storr, 1981; Ramphotyphlops ammodytes Wells & Wellington, 1984; Libertadictus ammodytes Wells & Wellington, 1985; Austrotyphlops ammodytes Wallach, 2006; Libertadictus (Slopptyphlops) ammodytes Hoser, 2013; Libertadictus (Slopptyphlops) richardwellsi Hoser, 2013

Species of Australian blind snake

Anilios ammodytes, also known as the sand-diving blind snake, is a species of blind snake that is endemic to Australia. The specific epithet ammodytes (“sand-diver”) refers to the snake's habits and habitat.

== Description ==
The species is a small, thin and pale blind snake. It grows to an average of about 25 cm in length.

== Behaviour ==
The species is oviparous.

== Distribution and habitat ==
The snake is found in the Pilbara region of Western Australia. The type locality is Hermite Island in the Montebello Islands off the Pilbara coast.
