= Rotund blind snake =

Conservation status
- Least Concern (IUCN 3.1)

Scientific classification
- Kingdom: Animalia
- Phylum: Chordata
- Class: Reptilia
- Order: Squamata
- Suborder: Serpentes
- Family: Typhlopidae
- Genus: Anilios
- Species: A. pinguis

Binomial name
- Anilios pinguis (Waite, 1897)

Synonyms
- Typhlops pinguis; Typhlops opisthopachys; Ramphotyphlops pinguis; Typhlina pinguis; Austrotyphlops pinguis

Species of snake

The rotund blind snake (Anilios pinguis) is a species of snake in the Typhlopidae family. It is found in Western Australia.

== Description ==
A. pinguis has a dark body and a slightly angular snout. A specimen of the species was 27.6 cm in length and weighed 17.2 grams.
