= Batillus blind snake =

Conservation status
- Data Deficient (IUCN 3.1)

Scientific classification
- Kingdom: Animalia
- Phylum: Chordata
- Class: Reptilia
- Order: Squamata
- Suborder: Serpentes
- Family: Typhlopidae
- Genus: Anilios
- Species: A. batillus

Binomial name
- Anilios batillus (Waite, 1894)

Synonyms
- Typhlops batillus; Ramphotyphlops batillus; Typhlina batilla; Ramphotyphlops battillus; Libertadictus batillus; Austrotyphlops batillus

Species of snake

The Batillus blind snake (Anilios batillus) is a species of snake in the Typhlopidae family.
