= Anilios insperatus =

Scientific classification
- Domain: Eukaryota
- Kingdom: Animalia
- Phylum: Chordata
- Class: Reptilia
- Order: Squamata
- Suborder: Serpentes
- Family: Typhlopidae
- Genus: Anilios
- Species: A. insperatus

Binomial name
- Anilios insperatus Venchi, Wilson & Borsboom, 2015

Species of Australian blind snake

Anilios insperatus, also known as the Fassifern blind snake, is a species of blind snake that is endemic to Australia. The specific epithet insperatus (“unexpected”) refers to the unexpected discovery of a new species in a well-populated and well-surveyed region less than 100 km from Brisbane. The common name derives from the type locality.

== Description ==
The single known specimen is 9.7 cm in length. The small, slim body is uniformly pale.

== Behaviour ==
The species is oviparous.

== Distribution ==
The snake was discovered in the Scenic Rim Region of South East Queensland. The type locality is Warrill View in the Fassifern Valley.
