= Long-beaked blind snake =

Conservation status
- Least Concern (IUCN 3.1)

Scientific classification
- Kingdom: Animalia
- Phylum: Chordata
- Class: Reptilia
- Order: Squamata
- Suborder: Serpentes
- Family: Typhlopidae
- Genus: Anilios
- Species: A. grypus

Binomial name
- Anilios grypus (Waite, 1918)

Synonyms
- Typhlops grypus; Typhlops kenti; Typhlops nigroterminatus; Ramphotyphlops nigroterminatus; Ramphotyphlops gryphus; Typhlina grypha; Typhlina nigroterminata; Ramphotyphlops grypus; Austrotyphlops grypus; Austrotyphlops nigroterminatus; Anilios nigroterminatus

Species of snake

The long-beaked blind snake (Anilios grypus) is a species of snake in the family Typhlopidae, first described in 1918 by Edgar Waite as Typhlops grypus, and endemic to northern Australia (in Western Australia, the Northern Territory, and Queensland).
