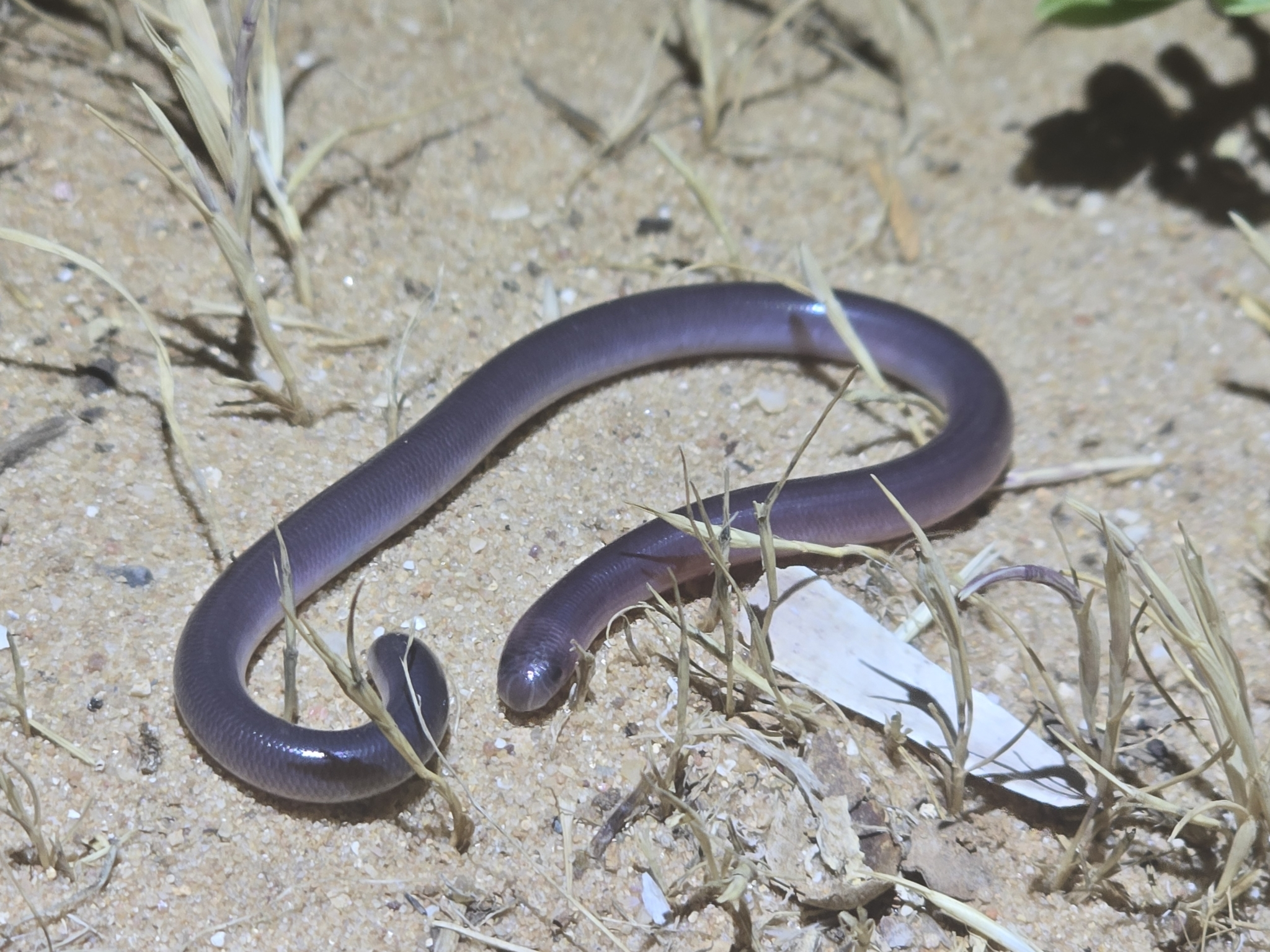

Conservation status
- Least Concern (IUCN 3.1)

Scientific classification
- Kingdom: Animalia
- Phylum: Chordata
- Class: Reptilia
- Order: Squamata
- Suborder: Serpentes
- Family: Typhlopidae
- Genus: Anilios
- Species: A. bicolor

Binomial name
- Anilios bicolor (Peters, 1858)

Synonyms
- Onychocephalus bicolor Peters, 1858; Typhlops bicolor Jan, 1864; Typhlops australis Waite, 1918; Ramphotyphlops australis Storr, 1981; Sivadictus bicolor Wells & Wellington, 1985; Ramphotyphlops bicolor Rabosky et al., 2004; Libertadictus (Bennetttyphlops) bicolor Hoser, 2013

= Anilios bicolor =

Species of Australian blind snake

Anilios bicolor, also known as the dark-spined blind snake, is a species of blind snake that is endemic to southern Australia. The specific epithet bicolor (“two-coloured”) refers to the snake's appearance.

== Description ==
The species grows to an average of about 42 cm in length.

== Behaviour ==
Anilios bicolor is a fossorial species that inhabits sandy to loamy soils. The species is oviparous.

== Distribution and habitat ==
The snake is found in extreme south-eastern Western Australia, much of southern South Australia, western New South Wales and north-western Victoria. The type locality is Adelaide. It typically lives in forests and shrublands, but it is thought to be not dependent on any specific vegetation type.
