= Anilios obtusifrons =

Scientific classification
- Kingdom: Animalia
- Phylum: Chordata
- Order: Squamata
- Suborder: Serpentes
- Family: Typhlopidae
- Genus: Anilios
- Species: A. obtusifrons

Binomial name
- Anilios obtusifrons Ellis & Doughty, 2017

Synonyms
- Ramphotyphlops nema Shea & Horner, 1997; Austrotyphlops nema Wallach, 2006

Species of Australian blind snake

Anilios obtusifrons, also known as the blunt-snouted blind snake, is a species of blind snake that is endemic to Australia. The specific epithet obtusifrons (“blunt-snouted”) refers to the snake's appearance.

== Description ==
The snake grows to about 22.5 cm in length. It is moderately long, slender and unpigmented.

== Behaviour ==
The species is oviparous.

== Distribution ==
The species occurs in the Geraldton Sandplains bioregion of Western Australia. The habitat is typically Acacia woodland or shrubland with scattered mallee on brown loam soils. The type locality is 23 km south of the town of Kalbarri.
