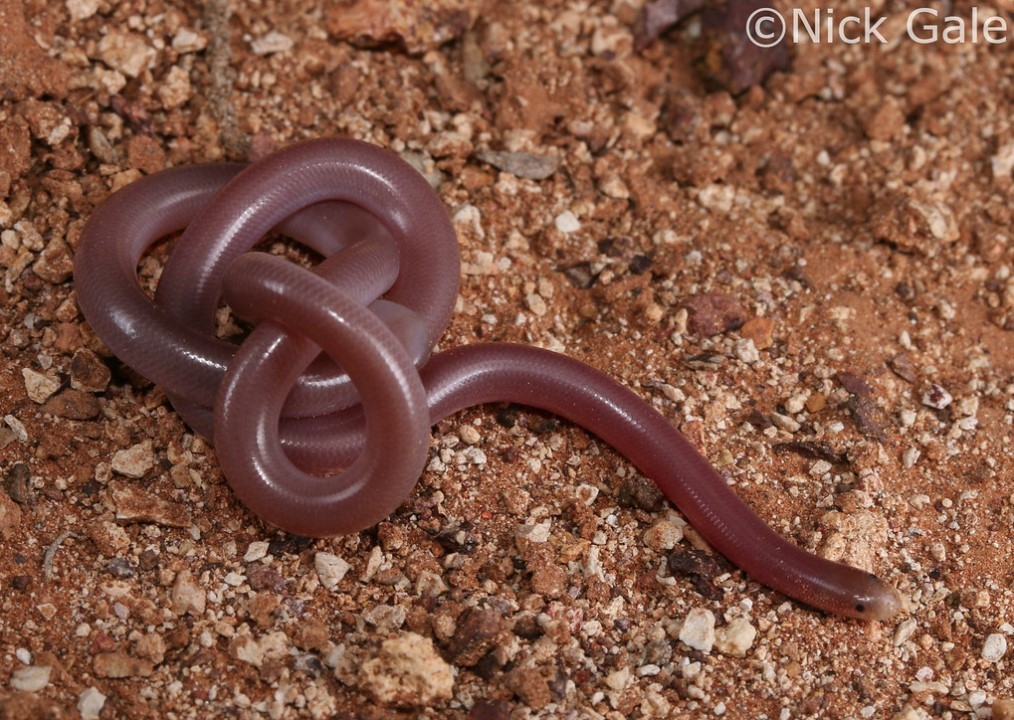

Conservation status
- Least Concern (IUCN 3.1)
- Endangered (NSWBCA)

Scientific classification
- Kingdom: Animalia
- Phylum: Chordata
- Class: Reptilia
- Order: Squamata
- Suborder: Serpentes
- Family: Typhlopidae
- Genus: Anilios
- Species: A. endoterus

Binomial name
- Anilios endoterus (Waite, 1918)
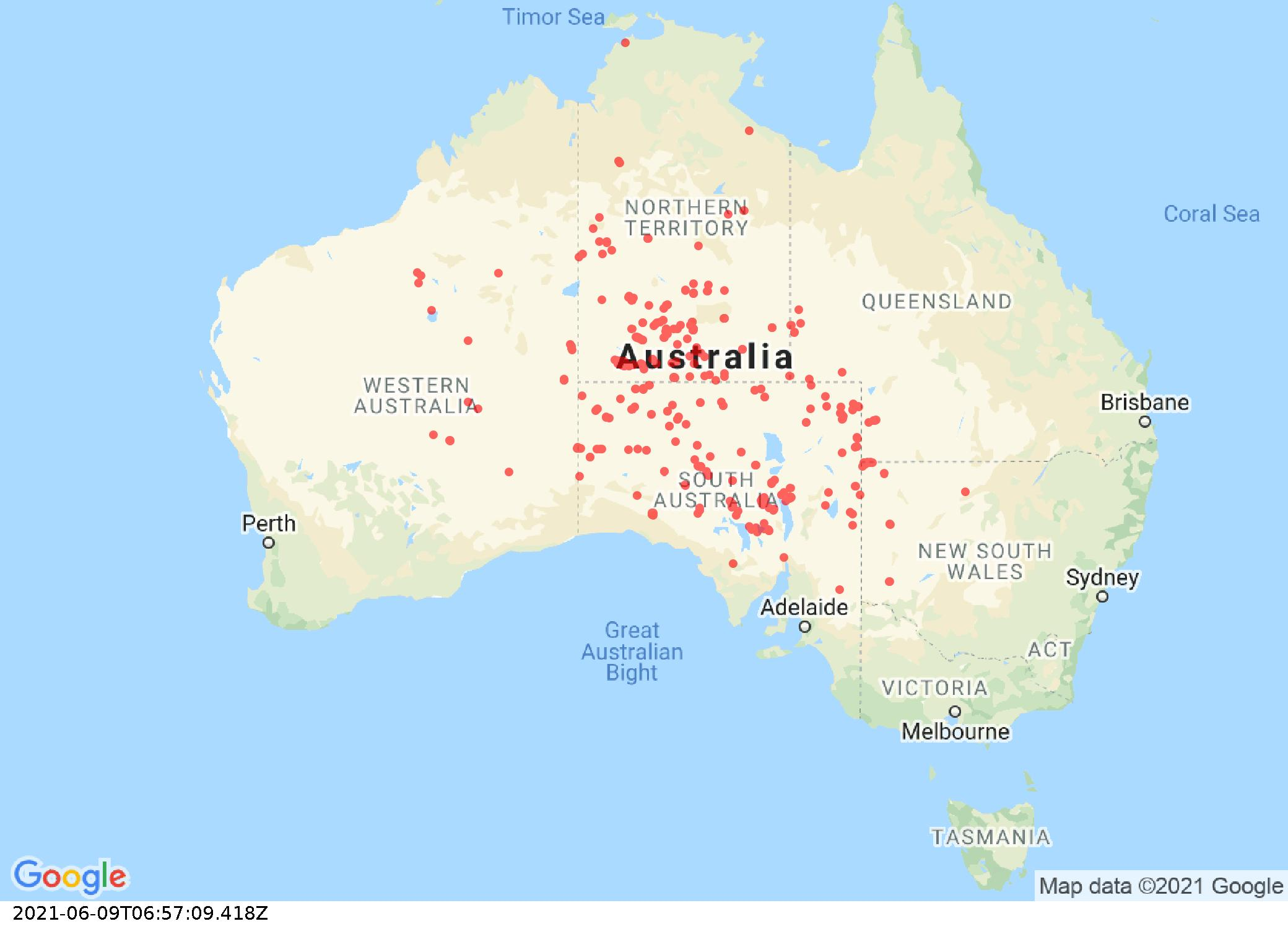
- Occurrence data for A. endoterus

Synonyms
- Typhlops endoterus; Typhlops leonhardii; Ramphotyphlops endoterus; Typhlina endotera; Austrotyphlops endoterus

= Interior blind snake =

Species of reptile

Anilios endoterus is commonly known as the interior blind snake. It is one of 42 species of snake in the genus Anilios (Ramphotyphlops) from the Typhlopidae family living in Australia. These snakes appear to be blind, having vestigial eyes that are extremely sensitive to light. It is a cryptic burrowing snake that lives in tunnels underground, living mainly on a diet of ants. They are found in arid and semi-arid desert regions of central Australia and are considered endangered in New South Wales (NSW).

== Description ==
Anilios endoterus is a terrestrial subterranean species of burrowing snake that has a worm-like appearance. Like many other snakes in the Typhlopidae family, the eyes of the interior blind snake are vestigial and appear like small, dark eye-spots under the scales of their head and are mainly used to detect light.

The dorsal side is brown or reddish-brown with a paler coloured snout, and its underbelly has a white or creamish appearance. The body is covered in smooth, tight-fitting shiny scales that are similar in size and are thick to help protect them from the stings and bites from ants. The tail is typically short with a small spur at the end that helps with anchorage and to push itself forward in the soil and tunnels underground. These snakes are moderately slender and uniform in thickness that grow to an average of 25 cm to a maximum of approximately 40 cm.

They are distinguishable from the 22 scales around the middle of the body, and they have between 406 and 438 ventral (belly) scales. the snout is weakly trilobed from above and bluntly angular in profile, and its mouth is small and is beneath the overhanging snout. The nasal clefts also extend from preocular scale to nostril, or to rostral scale.

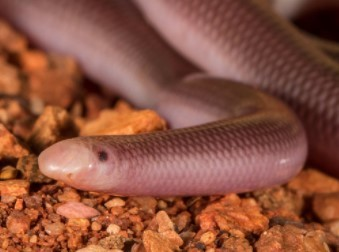
Vestigial eyes that are sensitive to light.

== Ecological studies ==
The genus Anilios is recognized as the most diverse and species rich genus in the Typhlopidae family, and the most abundant genus of Australian snakes. However, blind snakes in general, remain poorly studied and understood in Australia. Detecting and observing the interior blind snake in the wild is challenging for scientists. Their cryptic nature, low densities, similar appearance to other species within the genus, and the fact that this snake spends most of its time underground, have all led to this species remaining one of the most elusive vertebrates in the world.

Studies in behaviour and basic biological functions, such as courtship and mating, have still not been comprehensively documented. Consequently, assumptions about this species is based on the observations of others within the genus. For example, females in this genus tend to be much longer and thicker than the males. We also know that this species has nocturnal habits, as it is extremely sensitive to light, and they are mostly seen above ground at night foraging for food. They have also been observed on the surface at night after heavy rain.

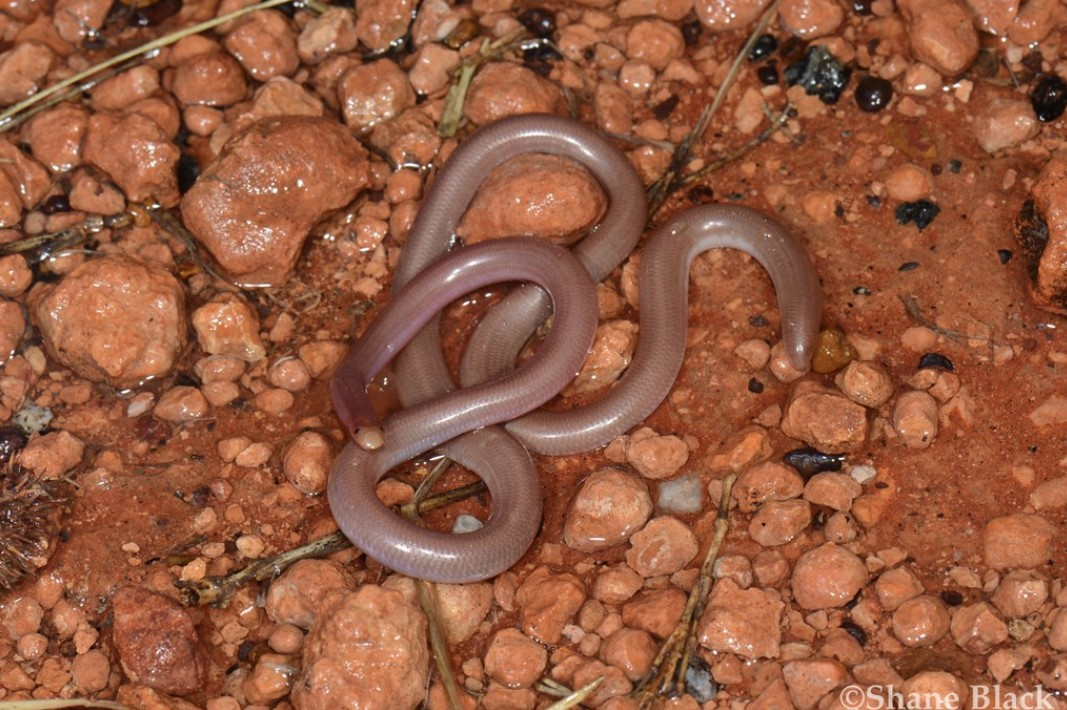
Interior blind snake can often be seen on the surface after heavy rain.

== Taxonomy ==
A description of the Anilios endoterus first appears as Typhlops endoterus in a paper published by Edgar Ravenswood Waite in 1918, titled Review of the Australian blind snakes (family Typhlopidae). According to the paper, three specimens from Hermannsburg in Central Australia were sent to the South Australian Museum for identification.

A paper published by Hedges et al., 2014, titled: A taxonomic framework for Typhlopid snakes from the Caribbean and other regions (Reptilia, Squamata), refers to the interior blind snake as Anilios endoterus, which has now become a widely accepted genus and scientific name for this species.

This species has several synonyms:

- Typhlops endoterus (Waite, 1918)
- Typhlops leonhardii (Sternfeld, 1919)
- Ramphotyphlops endoterus (Robb, 1966)
- Typhlina endotera (McDowell, 1974)
- Austrotyphlops endoterus (Wallach, 2006)
- Ramphotyphlops endoterus (Wilson & Swan, 2010)
- Anilios endoterus (Hedges et al., 2014)

== Distribution ==
The aptly named interior blind snake is mostly found living in the central areas of the continent in arid and semi-arid regions. They are located in Western Australia, the Northern Territory, South Australia, Queensland, and New South Wales.

== Conservation status ==
Anilios endoterus was not known to exist in NSW until herpetological surveys were undertaken at Mutawintji National Park in October 1994, January 1995, April 1995, October 1995, and November 1996. Small numbers have also been discovered living in Sturt National Park, Pooncarie, and in Toorale National Park.

It has been estimated that less than 10% of the total national population live in NSW.

On 8 August 1997, this snake was officially gazetted as an endangered species in NSW.

== Strategies for conservation ==
The interior blind snake has been assigned to the NSW Saving our Species (SoS) program. This program involves volunteers, scientists, businesses, community groups, and the NSW Government to work together with the objective of helping protect and conserve Australia's flora and fauna in the wild.

The Office of Environment & Heritage lists eight activities to help secure the future of the interior blind snake in NSW:

- Reduce or exclude grazing in some areas to allow habitat regeneration
- Retain grasslands, including the full cycle of grass development (seed set to tussock formation)
- Retain stick and leaf litter
- Retain understorey shrubs
- Retain fallen logs as habitat, especially if logs are embedded in the soil
- Maintain exfoliating and soil surface rocks
- Maintain Triodia (spinifex or porcupine grass)
- Report any new sightings of interior blind snake to Office of Environment & Heritage or the NSW National Parks and Wildlife Service

== Threats ==
General threats to the interior blind snake include: feral predators, such as cats; inappropriate fire regimes; habitat degradation and modification.

In New South Wales, the blind snake is threatened by habitat changes associated with overgrazing and soil compaction from feral goats and livestock. Additionally, these small populations are prone to genetic drift (a loss of genetic variation) due to reduced numbers found in this region. These isolated population are also more susceptible to a catastrophic event.

== Habitat ==
Generally, blind snakes can be found living underground in burrows in termite nests, and in loose soil under rocks, logs, and leaf litter. The interior blind snake is mostly found in arid and semi-environments, preferring sandy areas within grassland, shrubland, and spinifex communities.

== Reproduction ==
The interior blind snake is oviparous. Clutches of between 1 and 34 eggs, with an average of 13, have been recorded for Australian blind snakes.
