= Murchison blind snake =

Conservation status
- Least Concern (IUCN 3.1)

Scientific classification
- Kingdom: Animalia
- Phylum: Chordata
- Class: Reptilia
- Order: Squamata
- Suborder: Serpentes
- Family: Typhlopidae
- Genus: Anilios
- Species: A. leptosoma

Binomial name
- Anilios leptosoma (Robb, 1972)

Synonyms
- Ramphotyphlops leptosomus; Typhlina leptosoma; Austrotyphlops leptosomus; Anilios leptosomus

Species of snake

The Murchison blind snake (Anilios leptosoma) is a species of snake in the Typhlopidae family.
