= Anilios silvia =

Conservation status
- Least Concern (IUCN 3.1)

Scientific classification
- Kingdom: Animalia
- Phylum: Chordata
- Class: Reptilia
- Order: Squamata
- Suborder: Serpentes
- Family: Typhlopidae
- Genus: Anilios
- Species: A. silvia

Binomial name
- Anilios silvia (Ingram & Covacevich, 1993)

Synonyms
- Ramphotyphlops silvia Ingram & Covacevich, 1993; Austrotyphlops silvia — Wallach, 2006; Anilios silvia — Hedges et al., 2014

Species of snake

Anilios silvia, also known commonly as the great sandy blind snake or Sylvia's blind snake, is a species of snake in the family Typhlopidae. The species is endemic to northeastern Australia.

== Etymology ==
The specific name, silvia, is in honour of Hannah Sylvia Ingram, the mother of the senior describer of this species. It is also an allusion to Rhea Silvia, who in Roman mythology was the mother of twins Romulus and Remus.

== Geographic range ==
A. silvia is found in the Australian state of Queensland.

== Reproduction ==
A. silvia is oviparous.
