= Oligosoma pachysomaticum =

Scientific classification
- Domain: Eukaryota
- Kingdom: Animalia
- Phylum: Chordata
- Class: Reptilia
- Order: Squamata
- Family: Scincidae
- Genus: Oligosoma
- Species: O. pachysomaticum

Binomial name
- Oligosoma pachysomaticum (Robb, 1975)
- Distribution of Oligosoma pachysomaticum on a map of the North Island Known native range

Species of lizard

The Coromandel skink (Oligosoma pachysomaticum) is a species of skink found in New Zealand.
