= Malayotyphlops =

Scientific classification
- Kingdom: Animalia
- Phylum: Chordata
- Class: Reptilia
- Order: Squamata
- Suborder: Serpentes
- Family: Typhlopidae
- Genus: Malayotyphlops; Hedges, Marion, Lipp, Marin & Vidal, 2014

Genus of snakes

Malayotyphlops is a genus of snakes in the family Typhlopidae.

== Distribution ==
The 12 species of the genus Malayotyphlops are found in Indonesia and the Philippines.

== Species ==
The following species are recognized as being valid.

- Malayotyphlops andyi Wynn, Diesmos & R. Brown, 2016
- Malayotyphlops canlaonensis (Taylor, 1917)
- Malayotyphlops castanotus (Wynn & Leviton, 1993)
- Malayotyphlops collaris (Wynn & Leviton, 1993)
- Malayotyphlops denrorum Wynn, Diesmos & Brown, 2016
- Malayotyphlops hypogius (Savage, 1950)
- Malayotyphlops koekkoeki (Brongersma, 1934)
- Malayotyphlops kraalii (Doria, 1874)
- Malayotyphlops luzonensis (Taylor, 1919)
- Malayotyphlops manilae (Taylor, 1919)
- Malayotyphlops ruber (Boettger, 1897)
- Malayotyphlops ruficauda (Gray, 1845)

Nota bene: A binomial authority in parentheses indicates that the species was originally described in a genus other than Malayotyphlops.
