= Taylor's worm snake =

Conservation status
- Data Deficient (IUCN 3.1)

Scientific classification
- Kingdom: Animalia
- Phylum: Chordata
- Class: Reptilia
- Order: Squamata
- Suborder: Serpentes
- Family: Typhlopidae
- Genus: Malayotyphlops
- Species: M. canlaonensis

Binomial name
- Malayotyphlops canlaonensis (Taylor, 1917)

Synonyms
- Typhlops canlaonensis

Species of snake

Taylor's worm snake (Malayotyphlops canlaonensis) is a species of snake in the Typhlopidae family, endemic to Negros Island in the Philippines. It was described by Edward Harrison Taylor in 1917 based on a single specimen collected from Canlaon Volcano.

== Description ==
The head is slightly wider than the body and somewhat depressed, with a moderately projecting snout. The rostral scale is elliptic and distinctly wider posteriorly than at the tip, not reaching the level of the eyes, and more than one-third the width of the head. The nostrils are lateral and not visible from above. The large nasal scales are not in contact behind the rostral and are only partially divided by the nasal cleft, which arises from the second labial scale and runs through the nostril. The nasal scales contact the first three labials.

The preocular scale of Malayotyphlops canlaonensis is narrowed to a point dorsally and in contact with the supraocular above and the third labial below. The ocular is rectangular, narrowing both above and below, in contact with the third and fourth labials, and bordered behind by two (three on the left) enlarged body scales. The prefrontal scale is wider than tall and larger than the frontal, which is slightly wider than long. Their supraoculars are larger than both and approximately the size of the parietals. The eye is visible at a low level on the ocular, with a distinct whitish pupil. The snake has 30 scale rows around the body, and the tail ends in a sharp spine.

In terms of size, the total length of the holotype is 122 mm. The tail is 2.5 mm long and 4.2 mm wide. The head width ranges from 3.5 to 3.66 mm, and the body width is about 3 mm.

=== Coloration ===
The dorsal surface of Malayotyphlops canlaonensis is shiny greenish-black with a noticeable greenish sheen under certain light. The snout is dark brown. The underside of the snout, belly, and tail are pinkish-yellow, with a clear demarcation from the dorsal coloration, which covers 15 scale rows. Narrow lighter lines partially outline the head scales.
