= Bahamian slender blind snake =

Conservation status
- Least Concern (IUCN 3.1)

Scientific classification
- Kingdom: Animalia
- Phylum: Chordata
- Class: Reptilia
- Order: Squamata
- Suborder: Serpentes
- Family: Typhlopidae
- Genus: Cubatyphlops
- Species: C. biminiensis

Binomial name
- Cubatyphlops biminiensis (Richmond, 1955)

Synonyms
- Typhlops biminiensis Richmond, 1955; Cubatyphlops biminiensis — Hedges et al., 2014

Species of snake

The Bahamian slender blind snake (Cubatyphlops biminiensis) is a species of snake in the family Typhlopidae.

== Geographic range ==
C. biminiensis is endemic to the Bahamas.

== Description ==
C. biminiensis has a long and slender body. The dorsal scales in the vertebral row number 465-500 from the rostral to the tail-tip spine, and the scales around the body number 22–24. The snout is broad and rounded. The rostral scale is wide, half as wide as the head. The preocular is in contact with the second and third upper labials.

== Reproduction ==
C. biminiensis is oviparous.
