= Blackish blind snake =

Conservation status
- Least Concern (IUCN 3.1)

Scientific classification
- Kingdom: Animalia
- Phylum: Chordata
- Class: Reptilia
- Order: Squamata
- Suborder: Serpentes
- Family: Typhlopidae
- Genus: Anilios
- Species: A. nigrescens

Binomial name
- Anilios nigrescens (Gray, 1845)

Synonyms
- Typhlops nigrescens; Typhlops rueppelli; Typhlops temminckii; Typhlops reginae; Typhlops polygrammicus nigrescens; Ramphotyphlops nigrescens; Typhlina polygrammica; Typhlina polygrammica nigrescens; Austrotyphlops nigrescens

Species of snake

The blackish blind snake (Anilios nigrescens) is a species of snake in the Typhlopidae family native to south-eastern Australia.

== Description ==
It is a small burrowing snake with small dark eyes, a forked tongue and smooth scale around its body which permits them to travel through soil. They can grow to a size of 23 inches, with the largest recorded at 32 inches. Colour is brown/purplish on top, with a light shade of pink on the belly. The tail features a pointed tip which is a harmless spur. They can be mistaken for earthworms. Blind snakes move in a side-to-side motion on the ground, but underground they slither with tunnels made by insects.

== Diet ==
The species lives most of its life underground feeding on ants, termites and their larvae. To find their food they flick their tongue to pick up the scent of an ant or termite trail and follow it back to the nest, where they rake the ants into their mouth using their upper jaw and swallow the food whole.
