= Small-headed blind snake =

Conservation status
- Least Concern (IUCN 3.1)

Scientific classification
- Kingdom: Animalia
- Phylum: Chordata
- Class: Reptilia
- Order: Squamata
- Suborder: Serpentes
- Family: Typhlopidae
- Genus: Anilios
- Species: A. affinis

Binomial name
- Anilios affinis (Boulenger, 1889)

Synonyms
- Typhlops affinis; Typhlops kenti; Ramphotyphlops kenti; Ramphotyphlops affinis; Typhlina affinis; Sivadictus affinis; Sivadictus kenti; Austrotyphlops affinis; Libertadictus affinis

Species of snake

The small-headed blind snake (Anilios affinis) is a species of snake in the Typhlopidae family.
