= Typhlops grivensis =

Scientific classification
- Domain: Eukaryota
- Kingdom: Animalia
- Phylum: Chordata
- Class: Reptilia
- Order: Squamata
- Suborder: Serpentes
- Family: Typhlopidae
- Genus: Typhlops
- Species: T. grivensis

Binomial name
- Typhlops grivensis (Hoffstetter, 1946)

Species of snake

Typhlops grivensis is a species of snake in the Typhlopidae family. It is found in Africa.
