= Buff-snouted blind snake =

Conservation status
- Least Concern (IUCN 3.1)

Scientific classification
- Kingdom: Animalia
- Phylum: Chordata
- Class: Reptilia
- Order: Squamata
- Suborder: Serpentes
- Family: Typhlopidae
- Genus: Anilios
- Species: A. margaretae

Binomial name
- Anilios margaretae (Storr, 1981)

Synonyms
- Ramphotyphlops margaretae Storr, 1981; Austrotyphlops margaretae — Wallach, 2006; Anilios margaretae — Hedges et al., 2014

Species of snake

The buff-snouted blind snake (Anilios margaretae) is a species of snake in the family Typhlopidae. The species is endemic to Australia.

== Etymology ==
The specific name, margaretae, is in honour of Margaret Butler who was the wife of Australian naturalist Harry Butler.

== Description ==
Anilios margaretae may attain a total length (tail included) of 30.5 cm (12.0 in). It is a very slender blind snake with 18 rows of scales at midbody. The snout, when viewed from above, appears mildly trilobed. Dorsally, the body is pink to purplish grey. Ventrally, it is pale grey. The snout is pale yellowish brown.

== Geographic range ==
Anilios margaretae is found in the Australian state of Western Australia.

== Habitat ==
The preferred natural habitats of Anilios margaretae are desert and grassland.

== Behaviour ==
Anilios margaretae is terrestrial and fossorial.

== Reproduction ==
Anilios margaretae is oviparous.
