= Malayotyphlops ruber =

Conservation status
- Least Concern (IUCN 3.1)

Scientific classification
- Kingdom: Animalia
- Phylum: Chordata
- Class: Reptilia
- Order: Squamata
- Suborder: Serpentes
- Family: Typhlopidae
- Genus: Malayotyphlops
- Species: M. ruber

Binomial name
- Malayotyphlops ruber (Boettger, 1897)

Synonyms
- Typhlops ruber Boettger, 1897

Species of snake

Malayotyphlops ruber, also known as the Samar blind snake or red worm snake, is a species of snake in the family Typhlopidae. It is endemic to the Philippines, where it is widely distributed. Its type locality is Samar.

Malayotyphlops ruber occurs in secondary forest and wooded grasslands. It is a widespread and adaptable species that is not facing major threats. It is found in the Mount Apo National Park and Camotes Island Mangrove Swamp Forest Reserve.
