= Kunua blind snake =

Conservation status
- Data Deficient (IUCN 3.1)

Scientific classification
- Kingdom: Animalia
- Phylum: Chordata
- Class: Reptilia
- Order: Squamata
- Suborder: Serpentes
- Family: Typhlopidae
- Genus: Acutotyphlops
- Species: A. kunuaensis

Binomial name
- Acutotyphlops kunuaensis Wallach, 1995

Species of snake

The Kunua blind snake (Acutotyphlops kunuaensis) is a species of snake in the Typhlopidae family. It is endemic to the island of Bougainville.
