= Yirrkala blind snake =

Conservation status
- Least Concern (IUCN 3.1)

Scientific classification
- Kingdom: Animalia
- Phylum: Chordata
- Class: Reptilia
- Order: Squamata
- Suborder: Serpentes
- Family: Typhlopidae
- Genus: Anilios
- Species: A. yirrikalae

Binomial name
- Anilios yirrikalae (Kinghorn, 1942)

Synonyms
- Typhlops yirrikalae; Ramphotyphlops yirrikalae; Austrotyphlops yirrikalae

Species of snake

The Yirrkala blind snake (Anilios yirrikalae) is a species of snake in the Typhlopidae family.
