= Darwin blind snake =

Conservation status
- Least Concern (IUCN 3.1)

Scientific classification
- Kingdom: Animalia
- Phylum: Chordata
- Class: Reptilia
- Order: Squamata
- Suborder: Serpentes
- Family: Typhlopidae
- Genus: Anilios
- Species: A. tovelli

Binomial name
- Anilios tovelli (Loveridge, 1945)

Synonyms
- Typhlops tovelli Loveridge, 1945; Typhlina tovelli — Hahn, 1980; Ramphotyphlops tovelli — Cogger, 1994; Austrotyphlops tovelli — Wallach, 2006; Anilios tovelli — Hedges et al., 2014

Species of snake

The Darwin blind snake (Anilios tovelli) is a species of snake in the family Typhlopidae. The species is endemic to Australia.

== Etymology ==
The specific name, tovelli, is in honor of G. T. R. Tovell who collected the holotype while serving as a gunner in the Australian armed forces during World War II.

== Geographic range ==
In Australia, A. tovelli is found in the Northern Territory.

== Habitat ==
The preferred natural habitat of A. tovelli is savanna.

== Reproduction ==
A. tovelli is oviparous.
