= Red blind snake =

Conservation status
- Data Deficient (IUCN 3.1)

Scientific classification
- Kingdom: Animalia
- Phylum: Chordata
- Class: Reptilia
- Order: Squamata
- Suborder: Serpentes
- Family: Typhlopidae
- Genus: Acutotyphlops
- Species: A. infralabialis

Binomial name
- Acutotyphlops infralabialis (Waite, 1918)

Synonyms
- Typhlops infralabialis; Typhlops bergi; Typhlops adamsi

Species of snake

The red blind snake (Acutotyphlops infralabialis) is a species of snake in the Typhlopidae family. It is endemic to the Solomon Islands.
