= Beaked blind snake =

Conservation status
- Least Concern (IUCN 3.1)

Scientific classification
- Kingdom: Animalia
- Phylum: Chordata
- Class: Reptilia
- Order: Squamata
- Suborder: Serpentes
- Family: Typhlopidae
- Genus: Anilios
- Species: A. waitii

Binomial name
- Anilios waitii (Boulenger, 1895)

Synonyms
- Typhlops waitii Boulenger, 1895; Ramphotyphlops waitii — Cogger, 1983; Austrotyphlops waitii — Wallach, 2006; Anilios waitii — Hedges et al., 2014

Species of snake

The beaked blind snake (Anilios waitii), also known commonly as Waite's blind snake, is a species of snake in the family Typhlopidae.

== Etymology ==
The specific name, waitii, is in honor of English-born Australian zoologist Edgar Ravenswood Waite.

== Geographic range ==
A. waitii is endemic to Western Australia.

== Habitat ==
The preferred natural habitats of A. waitii are grassland, shrubland, and savanna.

== Reproduction ==
A. waitii is oviparous.
