= Yampi blind snake =

Conservation status
- Data Deficient (IUCN 3.1)

Scientific classification
- Kingdom: Animalia
- Phylum: Chordata
- Class: Reptilia
- Order: Squamata
- Suborder: Serpentes
- Family: Typhlopidae
- Genus: Anilios
- Species: A. yampiensis

Binomial name
- Anilios yampiensis (Storr, 1981)

Synonyms
- Ramphotyphlops yampiensis; Austrotyphlops yampiensis

Species of snake

The Yampi blind snake (Anilios yampiensis) is a species of snake in the Typhlopidae family.
