= Anilios diversus =

Conservation status
- Least Concern (IUCN 3.1)

Scientific classification
- Kingdom: Animalia
- Phylum: Chordata
- Class: Reptilia
- Order: Squamata
- Suborder: Serpentes
- Family: Typhlopidae
- Genus: Anilios
- Species: A. diversus

Binomial name
- Anilios diversus (Waite, 1894)

Synonyms
- Typhlops diversus Waite, 1894; Ramphotyphlops diversus — Robb, 1966; Typhlina diversa — McDowell, 1974; Austrotyphlops diversus — Wallach, 2006; Anilios diversus — Hedges et al., 2014

Species of snake

Anilios diversus, or the northern blind snake, is a species of snake in the family Typhlopidae. The species is endemic to Australia.

== Geographic range ==
Native to northern Australia, A. diversus is found in Northern Territory, Queensland, and Western Australia.

== Habitat ==
The preferred natural habitats of A. diversus are desert and grassland.

== Reproduction ==
A. diversus is oviparous.
