= White-tailed blind snake =

Conservation status
- Least Concern (IUCN 3.1)

Scientific classification
- Kingdom: Animalia
- Phylum: Chordata
- Class: Reptilia
- Order: Squamata
- Suborder: Serpentes
- Family: Typhlopidae
- Genus: Anilios
- Species: A. leucoproctus

Binomial name
- Anilios leucoproctus (Boulenger, 1889)

Synonyms
- Typhlops leucoproctus; Typhlina leucoprocta; Ramphotyphlops leucoproctus

Species of snake

The white-tailed blind snake (Anilios leucoproctus) is a species of snake in the Typhlopidae family.
