= Anilios pilbarensis =

Conservation status
- Least Concern (IUCN 3.1)

Scientific classification
- Kingdom: Animalia
- Phylum: Chordata
- Class: Reptilia
- Order: Squamata
- Suborder: Serpentes
- Family: Typhlopidae
- Genus: Anilios
- Species: A. pilbarensis

Binomial name
- Anilios pilbarensis (Aplin, 1993)

Synonyms
- Ramphotyphlops pilbarensis; Austrotyphlops pilbarensis

Species of snake

Anilios pilbarensis is a species of snake in the Typhlopidae family.
