= Kimberley shallow-soil blind snake =

Conservation status
- Least Concern (IUCN 3.1)

Scientific classification
- Kingdom: Animalia
- Phylum: Chordata
- Class: Reptilia
- Order: Squamata
- Suborder: Serpentes
- Family: Typhlopidae
- Genus: Anilios
- Species: A. kimberleyensis

Binomial name
- Anilios kimberleyensis (Storr, 1981)

Synonyms
- Ramphotyphlops kimberleyensis; Austrotyphlops kimberleyensis

Species of snake

The Kimberley shallow-soil blind snake (Anilios kimberleyensis) is a species of snake in the Typhlopidae family.
