= Anilios torresianus =

Scientific classification
- Domain: Eukaryota
- Kingdom: Animalia
- Phylum: Chordata
- Class: Reptilia
- Order: Squamata
- Suborder: Serpentes
- Family: Typhlopidae
- Genus: Anilios
- Species: A. torresianus

Binomial name
- Anilios torresianus (Boulenger, 1889)

Synonyms
- Typhlops torresianus Boulenger, 1889; Ramphotyphlops torresianus Robb, 1966; Ramphotyphlops polygrammicus Cogger, 2000

Species of Australian blind snake

Anilios torresianus, also known as the Torres Strait blind snake or north-eastern blind snake (and, formerly, the southern New Guinea blind snake) is a species of blind snake that is native to Australia and New Guinea. The specific epithet torresianus refers to the type locality.

== Description ==
The snake grows to an average of about 25 cm, and a maximum of 40 cm, in length.

== Behaviour ==
The species is oviparous.

== Distribution ==
The species occurs in southern Papua New Guinea and along the north-eastern coast of Queensland. The type locality is Murray Island in the Torres Strait Island Region of Far North Queensland.
