= Malayotyphlops luzonensis =

Conservation status
- Least Concern (IUCN 3.1)

Scientific classification
- Kingdom: Animalia
- Phylum: Chordata
- Class: Reptilia
- Order: Squamata
- Suborder: Serpentes
- Family: Typhlopidae
- Genus: Malayotyphlops
- Species: M. luzonensis

Binomial name
- Malayotyphlops luzonensis (Taylor, 1919)

Synonyms
- Typhlops luzonensis

Species of snake

Malayotyphlops luzonensis, also known as the Luzon blind snake or Luzon worm snake, is a species of snake in the Typhlopidae family.
