= Kei Island worm snake =

Conservation status
- Data Deficient (IUCN 3.1)

Scientific classification
- Kingdom: Animalia
- Phylum: Chordata
- Order: Squamata
- Suborder: Serpentes
- Family: Typhlopidae
- Genus: Malayotyphlops
- Species: M. kraalii

Binomial name
- Malayotyphlops kraalii (Doria, 1874)

Synonyms
- Typhlops kraalii Doria, 1874; Malayotyphlops kraalii — Hedges et al., 2014

Species of snake

The Kei Island worm snake (Malayotyphlops kraalii) is a species of snake in the family Typhlopidae.

== Etymology ==
The specific name, kraalii, is in honor of Captain P.F. Kraal of the Dutch military in the Moluccas, who assisted the Italian expedition on which the holotype was collected.

== Geographic range ==
M. kraalii is found in the Kai Islands of Indonesia.

== Habitat ==
The preferred natural habitat of M. kraalii is forest, at altitudes from sea level to 700 m (2,300 ft), but it has also been found in artificial habitats such as gardens and plantations.

== Behavior ==
M. kraalii is terrestrial and fossorial.

== Reproduction ==
M. kraalii is oviparous.
