= Kimberley deep-soil blind snake =

Conservation status
- Data Deficient (IUCN 3.1)

Scientific classification
- Kingdom: Animalia
- Phylum: Chordata
- Class: Reptilia
- Order: Squamata
- Suborder: Serpentes
- Family: Typhlopidae
- Genus: Anilios
- Species: A. howi

Binomial name
- Anilios howi Storr, 1983

Synonyms
- Rhamphotyphlops howi Storr, 1983; Austrotyphlops howi — Wallach, 2006; Anilios howi — Hedges et al., 2014

Species of snake

The Kimberley deep-soil blind snake (Anilios howi) is a species of snake in the family Typhlopidae. The species is endemic to Australia.

== Etymology ==
The specific name, howi, is in honour of Australian zoologist Richard Alfred How (born 1944).

== Geographic range ==
A. howi is found in the Australian state of Western Australia.

== Habitat ==
The preferred natural habitat of A. howi is grassland.

== Description ==
A. howi has 18 scale rows at midbody, and it has 434 ventrals. The nasal is completely divided, and the nasal cleft proceeds from the second upper labial. The holotype has a total length of 21 cm (8.3 in). Dorsally, it is dark brown, darker on the head, and even darker toward the tail tip. Ventrally, it is lighter brown.

== Behaviour ==
A. howi is terrestrial and fossorial.

== Reproduction ==
A. howi is oviparous.
