= Cape York striped blind snake =

Conservation status
- Least Concern (IUCN 3.1)

Scientific classification
- Kingdom: Animalia
- Phylum: Chordata
- Class: Reptilia
- Order: Squamata
- Suborder: Serpentes
- Family: Typhlopidae
- Genus: Anilios
- Species: A. chamodracaena

Binomial name
- Anilios chamodracaena (Ingram & Covacevich, 1993)

Synonyms
- Ramphotyphlops chamodracaena Ingram & Covacevich, 1993; Austrotyphlops chamodracaena (Ingram & Covacevich, 1993)

Species of snake

The Cape York striped blind snake (Anilios chamodracaena) is a species of snake in the family Typhlopidae. It is endemic to northern Queensland, Australia.
