= Claw-snouted blind snake =

Conservation status
- Least Concern (IUCN 3.1)

Scientific classification
- Kingdom: Animalia
- Phylum: Chordata
- Class: Reptilia
- Order: Squamata
- Suborder: Serpentes
- Family: Typhlopidae
- Genus: Anilios
- Species: A. unguirostris

Binomial name
- Anilios unguirostris (Peters, 1867)

Synonyms
- Typhlops curvirostris; Typhlops unguirostris; Ramphotyphlops unguirostris; Typhlina unguirostris; Austrotyphlops unguirostris

Species of snake

The claw-snouted blind snake (Anilios unguirostris) is a species of snake in the family Typhlopidae.
