= Groote dwarf blind snake =

Conservation status
- Least Concern (IUCN 3.1)

Scientific classification
- Kingdom: Animalia
- Phylum: Chordata
- Class: Reptilia
- Order: Squamata
- Suborder: Serpentes
- Family: Typhlopidae
- Genus: Anilios
- Species: A. minimus

Binomial name
- Anilios minimus (Kinghorn, 1929)

Synonyms
- Typhlops minimus; Ramphotyphlops minimus; Typhlina minima; Austrotyphlops minimus

Species of snake

The Groote dwarf blind snake (Anilios minimus) is a species of snake in the family Typhlopidae. It is endemic to the Northern Territory, Australia.
