= Malayotyphlops castanotus =

Scientific classification
- Kingdom: Animalia
- Phylum: Chordata
- Class: Reptilia
- Order: Squamata
- Suborder: Serpentes
- Family: Typhlopidae
- Genus: Malayotyphlops
- Species: M. castanotus

Binomial name
- Malayotyphlops castanotus (Wynn & Leviton, 1993)

Synonyms
- Typhlops castanotus

Species of snake

Malayotyphlops castanotus, also known as the brown-backed blind snake or Wynn's worm snake, is a species of snake in the Typhlopidae family.
