= Cayman Brac blind snake =

Conservation status
- Critically Endangered (IUCN 3.1)

Scientific classification
- Kingdom: Animalia
- Phylum: Chordata
- Class: Reptilia
- Order: Squamata
- Suborder: Serpentes
- Family: Typhlopidae
- Genus: Cubatyphlops
- Species: C. epactius

Binomial name
- Cubatyphlops epactius (Thomas, 1968)

Synonyms
- Typhlops biminiensis epactia Thomas, 1968; Typhlops epactia — Schwartz & Henderson, 1991; Typhlops epactius — McDiarmid, Campbell & Touré, 1999; Cubatyphlops epactius — Hedges et al., 2014

Species of snake

The Cayman Brac blind snake (Cubatyphlops epactius) is a species of snake in the family Typhlopidae.

== Geographic range ==
C. epactius is endemic to the Cayman Islands.

== Habitat ==
The preferred habitats of C. epactius are coastal marine, supratidal, and forest at altitudes of 2–5 m (6.6–16.4 ft).

== Reproduction ==
C. epactius is oviparous.
