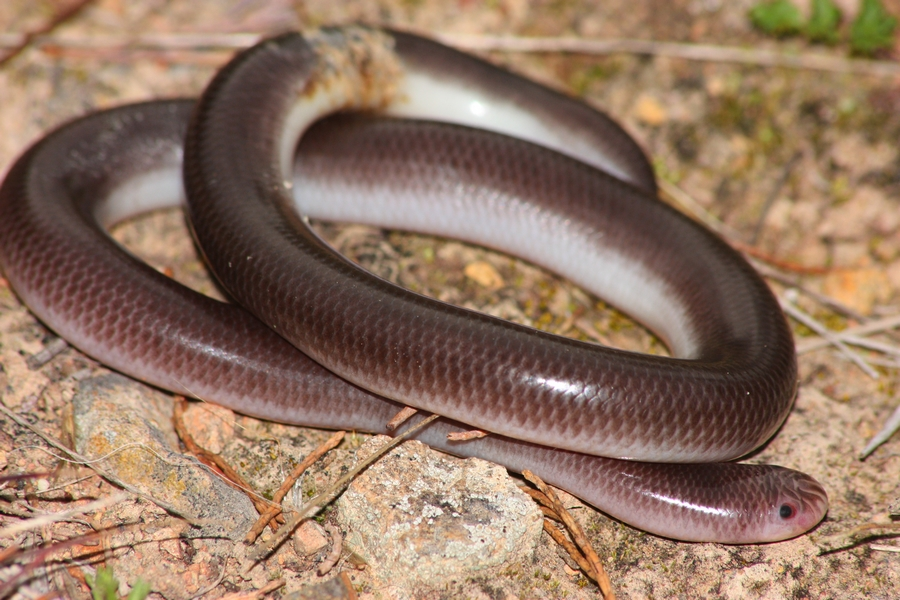

Conservation status
- Least Concern (IUCN 3.1)

Scientific classification
- Kingdom: Animalia
- Phylum: Chordata
- Class: Reptilia
- Order: Squamata
- Suborder: Serpentes
- Family: Typhlopidae
- Genus: Anilios
- Species: A. ligatus

Binomial name
- Anilios ligatus (Peters, 1879)

Synonyms
- Typhlops ligatus; Typhlops curtus; Ramphotyphlops ligatus; Typhlina ligata; Austrotyphlops ligatus

= Robust blind snake =

Species of snake

The robust blind snake (Anilios ligatus) is a species of snake in the Typhlopidae family.
