= Malayotyphlops collaris =

Conservation status
- Data Deficient (IUCN 3.1)

Scientific classification
- Kingdom: Animalia
- Phylum: Chordata
- Class: Reptilia
- Order: Squamata
- Suborder: Serpentes
- Family: Typhlopidae
- Genus: Malayotyphlops
- Species: M. collaris

Binomial name
- Malayotyphlops collaris (Wynn & Leviton, 1993)

Synonyms
- Typhlops collaris

Species of snake

Malayotyphlops collaris, also known as the collared worm snake or light-collared blind snake, is a species of snake in the Typhlopidae family.
