= Cayman worm snake =

Conservation status
- Endangered (IUCN 3.1)

Scientific classification
- Kingdom: Animalia
- Phylum: Chordata
- Class: Reptilia
- Order: Squamata
- Suborder: Serpentes
- Family: Typhlopidae
- Genus: Cubatyphlops
- Species: C. caymanensis

Binomial name
- Cubatyphlops caymanensis (Sackett, 1940)

Synonyms
- Typhlops caymanensis

Species of snake

The Cayman worm snake (Cubatyphlops caymanensis) is a species of snake in the Typhlopidae family.
