= Centralian blind snake =

Conservation status
- Least Concern (IUCN 3.1)

Scientific classification
- Kingdom: Animalia
- Phylum: Chordata
- Class: Reptilia
- Order: Squamata
- Suborder: Serpentes
- Family: Typhlopidae
- Genus: Anilios
- Species: A. centralis

Binomial name
- Anilios centralis (Storr, 1984)

Synonyms
- Ramphotyphlops centralis; Libertadictus centralis; Austrotyphlops centralis

Species of reptile

The Centralian blind snake (Anilios centralis) is a species of snake in the family Typhlopidae.
