= Bismarck sharp-nosed blind snake =

Conservation status
- Least Concern (IUCN 3.1)

Scientific classification
- Kingdom: Animalia
- Phylum: Chordata
- Class: Reptilia
- Order: Squamata
- Suborder: Serpentes
- Family: Typhlopidae
- Genus: Acutotyphlops
- Species: A. subocularis

Binomial name
- Acutotyphlops subocularis (Waite, 1897)

Synonyms
- Typhlops subocularis; Typhlops keasti; Ramphotyphlops keasti; Typhlina subocularis; Ramphotyphlops subocularis

Species of snake

The Bismarck sharp-nosed blind snake (Acutotyphlops subocularis) is a species of snake in the Typhlopidae family. It is found in the Bismarck Archipelago and the Solomon Islands.
