= Sandamara blind snake =

Conservation status
- Least Concern (IUCN 3.1)

Scientific classification
- Kingdom: Animalia
- Phylum: Chordata
- Class: Reptilia
- Order: Squamata
- Suborder: Serpentes
- Family: Typhlopidae
- Genus: Anilios
- Species: A. troglodytes

Binomial name
- Anilios troglodytes (Storr, 1981)

Synonyms
- Ramphotyphlops troglodytes; Austrotyphlops troglodytes

Species of snake

The Sandamara blind snake (Anilios troglodytes) is a species of snake in the Typhlopidae family.
