= Northern New Guinea blind snake =

Conservation status
- Least Concern (IUCN 3.1)

Scientific classification
- Kingdom: Animalia
- Phylum: Chordata
- Class: Reptilia
- Order: Squamata
- Suborder: Serpentes
- Family: Typhlopidae
- Genus: Anilios
- Species: A. erycinus

Binomial name
- Anilios erycinus (Werner, 1901)

Synonyms
- Typhlops erycinus Werner, 1901; Typhlops iridescens Jong, 1930; Typhlina erycina (Werner, 1901); Ramphotyphlops erycinus (Werner, 1901)

Species of snake

Anilios erycinus, the northern New Guinea blind snake, is a species of snake in the Typhlopidae family. It is found in northern New Guinea in both Papua New Guinea and Western New Guinea.

Anilios erycinus is a little known fossorial species occurring in lowland areas. It is oviparous.
