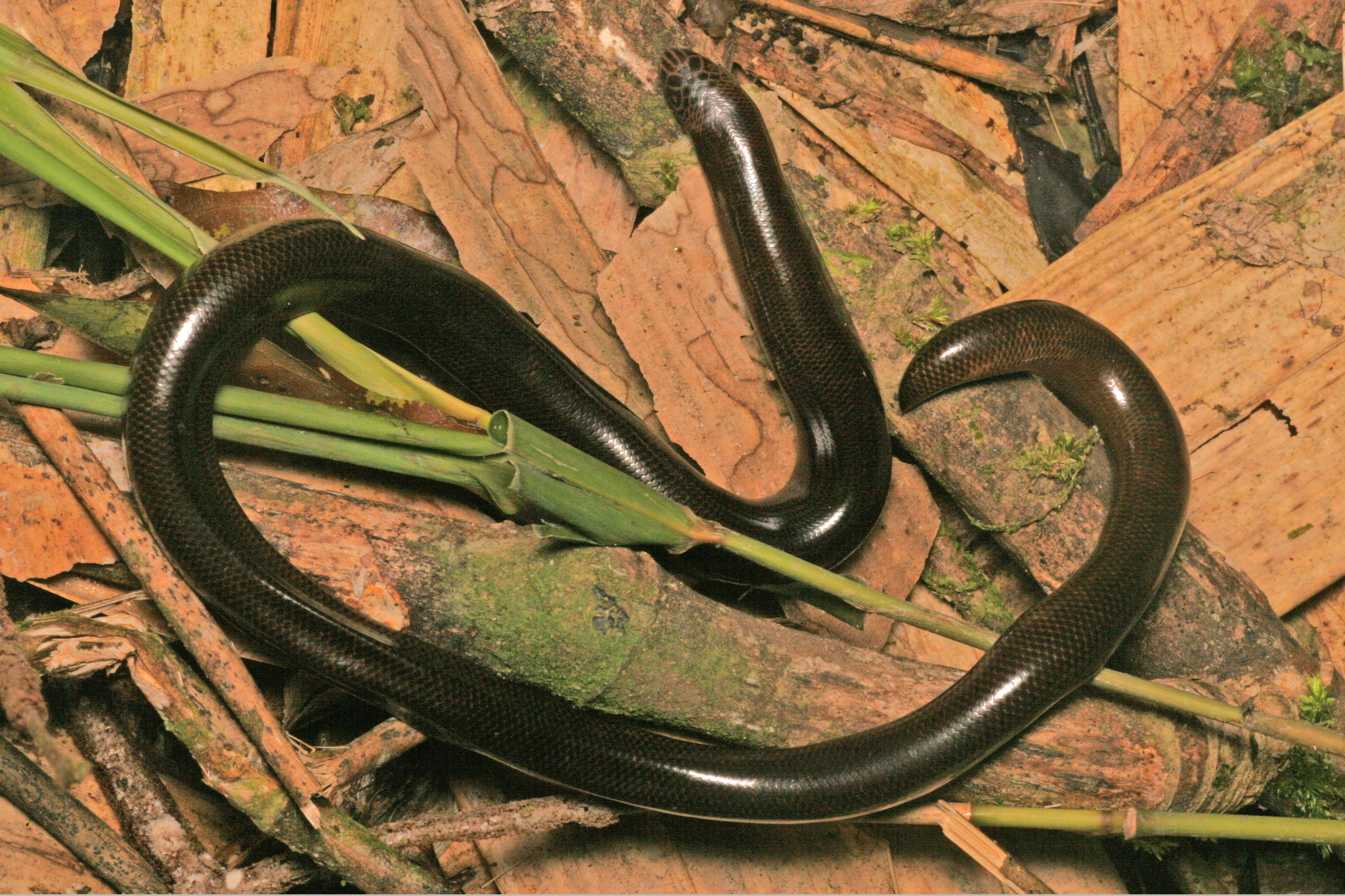

Conservation status
- Data Deficient (IUCN 3.1)

Scientific classification
- Kingdom: Animalia
- Phylum: Chordata
- Class: Reptilia
- Order: Squamata
- Suborder: Serpentes
- Family: Typhlopidae
- Genus: Acutotyphlops
- Species: A. solomonis

Binomial name
- Acutotyphlops solomonis (Parker, 1939)

Synonyms
- Typhlops solomonis; Ramphotyphlops solominis

= Acutotyphlops solomonis =

Species of snake

Acutotyphlops solomonis is a species of snake in the family Typhlopidae. It is found in the Solomon Islands and Papua New Guinea.
