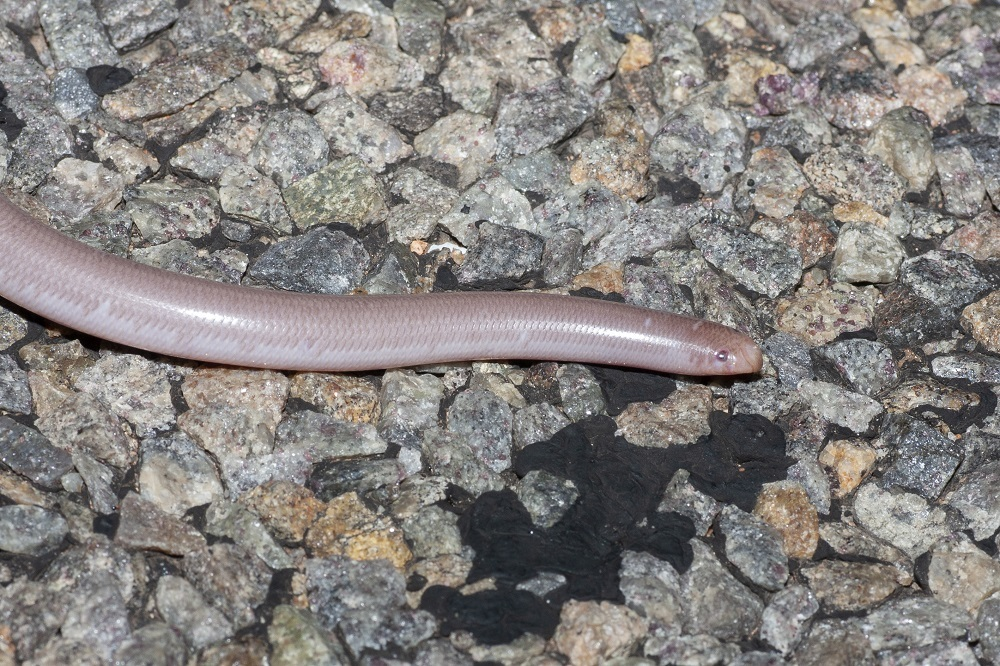
- Anilios hamatus in Monkey Mia, Western Australia

Conservation status
- Least Concern (IUCN 3.1)

Scientific classification
- Kingdom: Animalia
- Phylum: Chordata
- Class: Reptilia
- Order: Squamata
- Suborder: Serpentes
- Family: Typhlopidae
- Genus: Anilios
- Species: A. hamatus

Binomial name
- Anilios hamatus (Storr, 1981)

Synonyms
- Ramphotyphlops hamatus; Austrotyphlops hamatus

= Pale-headed blind snake =

Species of snake

The pale-headed blind snake (Anilios hamatus) is a species of snake in the family Typhlopidae.
