= Cubatyphlops =

Scientific classification
- Kingdom: Animalia
- Phylum: Chordata
- Class: Reptilia
- Order: Squamata
- Suborder: Serpentes
- Family: Typhlopidae
- Genus: Cubatyphlops; Hedges, Marion, Lipp, Marin & Vidal, 2014

Genus of snakes

Cubatyphlops is a genus of snakes in the family Typhlopidae.

== Distribution ==
The 12 species of the genus Cubatyphlops are found mostly on Cuba, but also occur on other Caribbean islands.

== Species ==
The following species are recognized as being valid.

- Cubatyphlops anchaurus (Thomas & Hedges, 2007)
- Cubatyphlops anousius (Thomas & Hedges, 2007)
- Cubatyphlops arator (Thomas & Hedges, 2007)
- Cubatyphlops biminiensis (Richmond, 1955)
- Cubatyphlops caymanensis (Sackett, 1940)
- Cubatyphlops contorhinus (Thomas & Hedges, 2007)
- Cubatyphlops epactius (Thomas, 1968)
- Cubatyphlops golyathi (Domínguez & Moreno, 2009)
- Cubatyphlops notorachius (Thomas & Hedges, 2007)
- Cubatyphlops paradoxus (Thomas, 1968)
- Cubatyphlops perimychus (Thomas & Hedges, 2007)
- Cubatyphlops satelles (Thomas & Hedges, 2007)

Nota bene: A binomial authority in parentheses indicates that the species was originally described in a genus other than Cubatyphlops.
