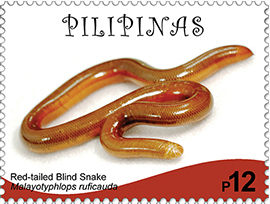

Conservation status
- Data Deficient (IUCN 3.1)

Scientific classification
- Kingdom: Animalia
- Phylum: Chordata
- Class: Reptilia
- Order: Squamata
- Suborder: Serpentes
- Family: Typhlopidae
- Genus: Malayotyphlops
- Species: M. ruficauda

Binomial name
- Malayotyphlops ruficauda (Gray, 1845)

Synonyms
- Anilios ruficauda Gray, 1845; Typhlops jagori Boulenger, 1893; Typhlops petersii Steindacher, 1867; Typhlops ruficauda Boettger, 1886; Typhlops ruficaudus McDiarmid, Campbell, & Toure, 1999; Malayotyphlops ruficaudus Diesmos, 2016

= Malayotyphlops ruficauda =

Species of snake

Malayotyphlops ruficauda, commonly known as brown blind snake or red-headed worm snake, is a species of snake in the Typhlopidae family. It is endemic to the Philippines, where it is found on the islands of Luzon, Tablas and Marinduque.
