= Storr Island =

Island in Western Australia

Storr
- Location within Western Australia

Geography
- Coordinates: 15.94126736°S 124.5658727°E
- Area: 1,896 ha (4,690 acres)

Administration
- Australia

Demographics
- Population: 0

Storr Island, also known as Yudawala or Yeewadan Ganjal, is an uninhabited island located in the Kimberley region of Western Australia.

It is situated between Doubtful Bay and George Water, near the intersection of the Sale and Glenelg rivers. Storr Island is about 150 kilometres (93 mi) north west of Bardi. The island encompasses an area of 1,896 hectares (4,685 acres).

Fauna found on the island include the golden bandicoot and many types of birds, including the pied imperial pigeon, sulphur-crested cockatoo, brown honeyeater, white-gaped honeyeater, white-lined honeyeater, silver-crowned friarbird, mangrove golden whistler, leaden flycatcher, northern fantail, black-faced cuckoo-shrike, varied triller and the great bowerbird.

The traditional owners of the area are the Dambimangari people of the Worrorra language group. Their name for the island is Yudawala or Yeewadan Ganjal.
