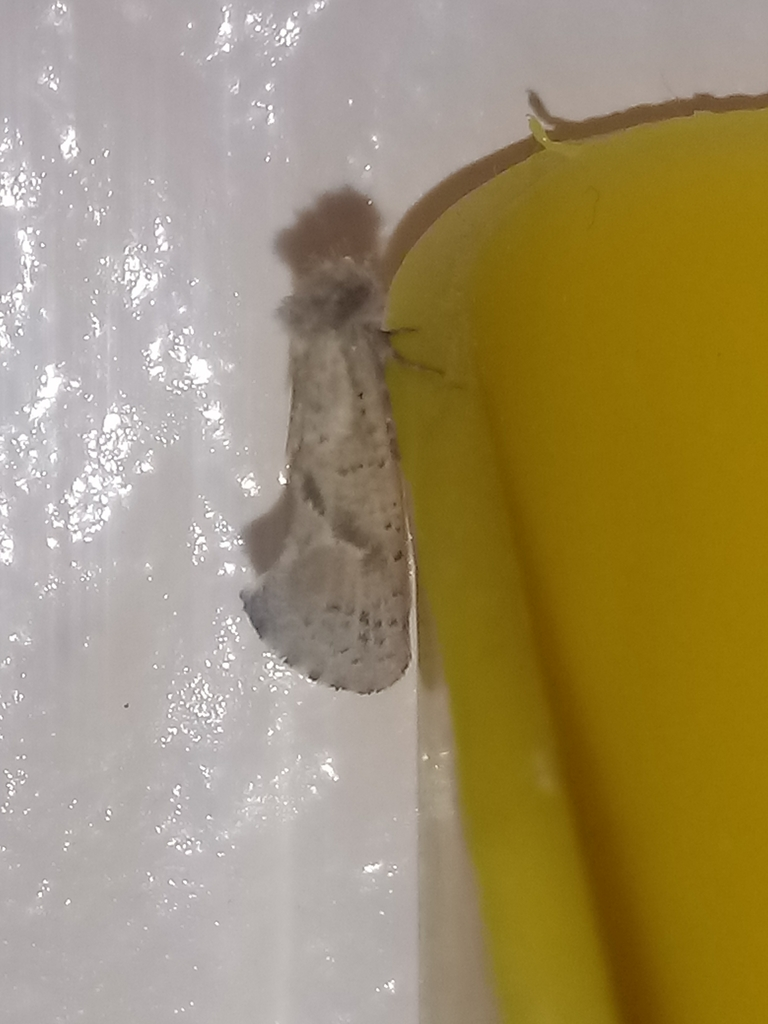

Scientific classification
- Kingdom: Animalia
- Phylum: Arthropoda
- Clade: Pancrustacea
- Class: Insecta
- Order: Lepidoptera
- Family: Tineidae
- Genus: Acrolophus
- Species: A. kearfotti

Binomial name
- Acrolophus kearfotti (Dyar, 1903)

Synonyms
- Eulepiste kearfotti Dyar, 1903; Acrolophus diversus Busck, 1912

= Acrolophus kearfotti =

Species of moth

Acrolophus kearfotti is a moth of the family Acrolophidae. It was described by Harrison Gray Dyar Jr. in 1903. It is found in North America, including Arizona, California, Florida, Nevada and New Mexico.

The wingspan is 24–27 mm.
