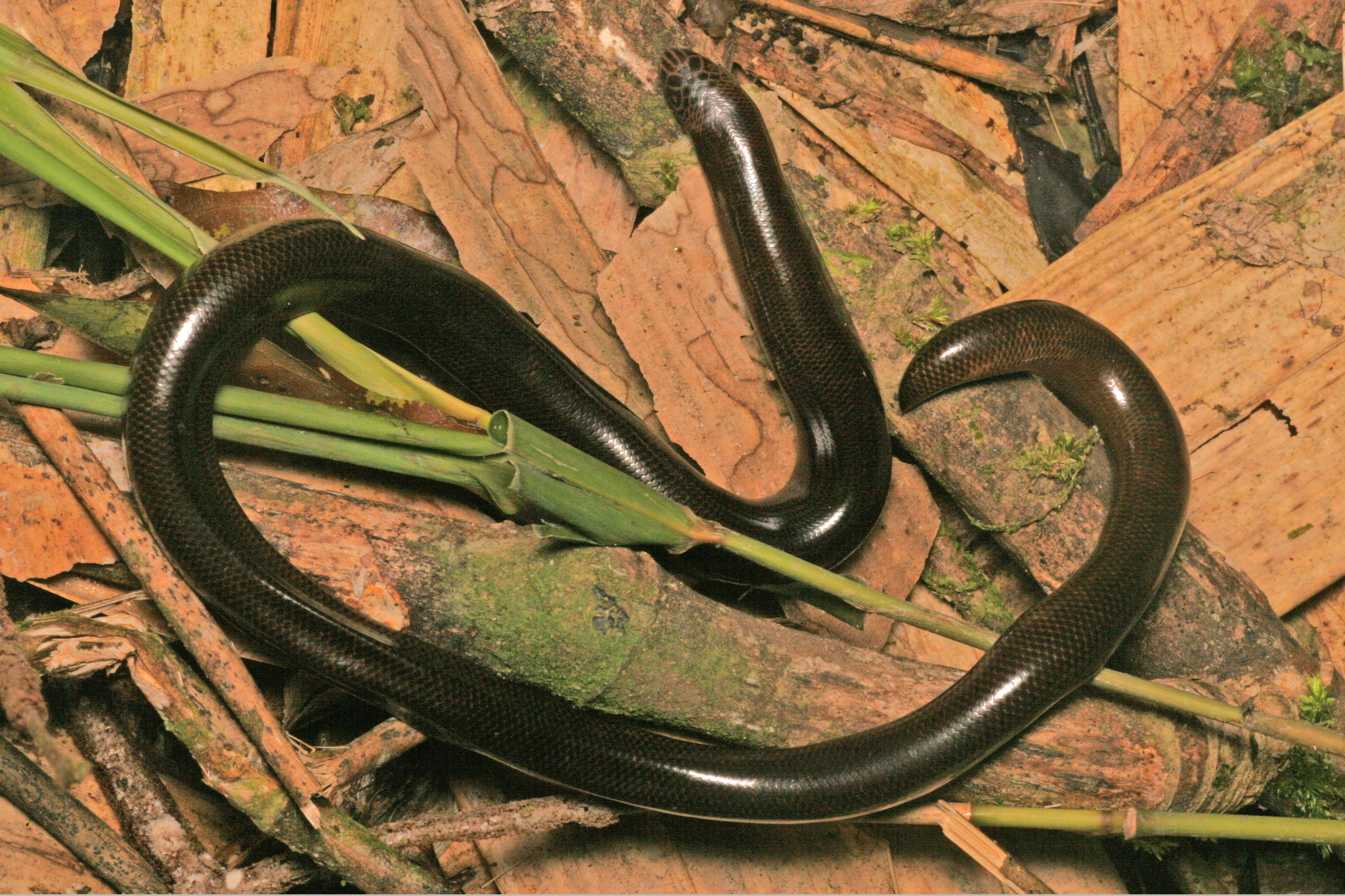
- Acutotyphlops solomonis

Scientific classification
- Domain: Eukaryota
- Kingdom: Animalia
- Phylum: Chordata
- Class: Reptilia
- Order: Squamata
- Suborder: Serpentes
- Family: Typhlopidae
- Genus: Acutotyphlops; Wallach, 1995

= Acutotyphlops =

Genus of snakes

Acutotyphlops is a genus of blind snakes found in the Philippines, eastern Papua New Guinea, and the Solomon Islands. Five species are recognized, with the latest being recognized in 2007.

== Geographic range ==
They are found in the Philippines, eastern Papua New Guinea, and the Solomon Islands.

== Species ==
Species	Taxon author	Common name	Geographic range
Acutotyphlops banaorum	Wallach et al., 2007		Kalinga Province of Luzon, the Philippines.
Acutotyphlops infralabialis	(Waite, 1918)		The Solomon Islands: Bougainville, New Georgia, Malaita and Guadalcanal.
Acutotyphlops kunuaensis^{T}	Wallach, 1995		The island of Bougainville (endemic).
Acutotyphlops solomonis	(Parker, 1939)		Eastern Papua New Guinea and on the island of Bougainville.
Acutotyphlops subocularis	(Waite, 1897)		Umboi Island, New Britain, Duke of York Island, New Ireland, the Bismarck Archipelago and the Solomon Islands (Bougainville, Guadalcanal, Malaita, New Georgia and Nggela).

^{T}) Type species.

== Taxonomy ==
In 2007, a new species was described that is found in the Philippines—more than 4.000 km from the other species of the genus.
