= Sundatyphlops polygrammicus =

Scientific classification
- Kingdom: Animalia
- Phylum: Chordata
- Class: Reptilia
- Order: Squamata
- Suborder: Serpentes
- Family: Typhlopidae
- Genus: Sundatyphlops; Hedges, Marion, Lipp, Marin, & Vidal, 2014
- Species: S. polygrammicus

Binomial name
- Sundatyphlops polygrammicus (Schlegel, 1839)

Synonyms
- Typhlops polygrammicus; Argyophis polygrammicus; Typhlops florensis; Typhlops soensis; Typhlina polygrammica; Ramphotyphlops polygrammicus; Anilios polygrammicus; Typhlops elberti; Tyyphiops floris

Species of snake

Sundatyphlops polygrammicus, also known as the Lesser Sunda blind snake or north-eastern blind snake, is a species of snake in the Typhlopidae family.
