= Joan Robb =

New Zealand zoologist, professor and curator

- Born: 1921
- Died: 19 October 2017, age 95; Auckland
- Education: Massey Agricultural College
- Scientific career
- Fields: herpetology
- Workplaces: Auckland University
- Author abbrev. (zoology): Robb

Joan Robb (c. 1921 – 19 October 2017) was a New Zealand herpetologist working in the Zoology Department at the University of Auckland as an associate professor. After retirement, she was a wildlife tour guide in New Zealand and the Indian subcontinent, Africa and Australia.

== Academic career ==
Robb grew up in Gisborne, and was educated at home through the Correspondence School. After a Diploma in Agriculture from Massey Agricultural College, she studied at the University of Auckland, graduating with an MSc in zoology in 1956. Robb then worked in the Department of Zoology at the University of Auckland, becoming an associate professor in 1967. She taught vertebrate form and function. She retired in 1978, after which she became a tour guide for wildlife tours to Malaysia, Nepal, China, Australia, and Africa.

Robb held positions on the Fauna Protection Advisory Council (an advisory group to the Department of Internal Affairs, who were then responsible for conservation) and the Council of the Auckland Museum.

Robb's research focused on herpetology, particularly New Zealand lizards, and she named five new taxa of skink and gecko. Her 1980 book describing New Zealand amphibians and reptiles was considered to be "academic in quality, but popular in tone".

In 2017, Robb was named as one of the Royal Society Te Apārangi's 150 women in 150 words.

Robb died in Auckland on 19 October 2017.

== Taxa named by Robb ==
- Gold-striped gecko
- Macgregor's skink
- Oligosoma pachysomaticum
- Robust skink
- Stephen's Island gecko

== Selected works ==
- Robb, Joan (1966). "The generic status of the Australasian typhlopids (Reptilia: Squamata)". Annals and Magazine of Natural History. 9 (106–108): 675–679. doi:10.1080/00222936608651678. Wikidata Q99849286.
- Robb, Joan (1966). "The structure and possible function of the cloacal pouches of male Australian Typhlopids". Australian Journal of Zoology. 14 (1): 27. doi:10.1071/zo9660027. Wikidata Q99975772.
- Robb, Joan; Turbott, Evan Graham (1971). "Tu'i Malila, "Cook's Tortoise"". Records of the Auckland Institute and Museum. 8: 229–233. JSTOR 42906170. Wikidata Q58676901.
- Robb, Joan (1975). "Two new skinks of the genus Leiolopisma from New Zealand". Proceedings of the section of sciences. 78: 477–484. Wikidata Q104525474.
- Robb, Joan (1977), The Tuatara, Shildon, OCLC 3994967, Wikidata Q104525455
- Robb, Joan (1980), New Zealand Amphibians and Reptiles in Colour, OCLC 7204055, Wikidata Q104524916
- Robb, Joan (1980). "Three new species of gekkonid lizards, genera Hoplodactylus Fitzinger and Heteropholis Fischer, from New Zealand". National Museum of New Zealand Records. 1 (19): 305–310. ISSN 0110-943X. Wikidata Q104525406.
