= Edgar Ravenswood Waite =

British/Australian zoologist

Edgar Ravenswood Waite (5 May 1866 – 19 January 1928) was a British/Australian zoologist, ichthyologist, herpetologist, and ornithologist.

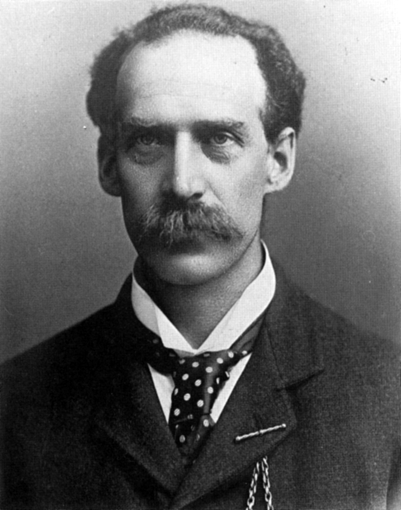

Waite was born in Leeds, Yorkshire, England, the second son of John Waite, a bank clerk, and his wife Jane, née Vause. Waite was educated at Leeds Parish Church Middle Class School and at the Victoria University of Manchester. In 1888 he was appointed sub-curator of the Leeds Museum and three years later was made curator. On 7 April 1892 Waite married Rose Edith Green at St. Matthew's parish church, Leeds. In 1893 Waite became zoologist at the Australian Museum, Sydney, he was the Fish Curator there from 1893 to 1906.

Waite accompanied Charles Hedley of the Australian Museum on the 1896 Funafuti Coral Reef Boring Expedition of the Royal Society under Professor William Sollas and Professor Edgeworth David. Following the expedition to Funafuti in the Ellice Islands (now known as Tuvalu) Waite published an account of The mammals, reptiles, and fishes of Funafuti.

In the scientific discipline of herpetology he described several new species of reptiles. In 1898 Waite published Popular Account of Australian Snakes.

He was involved in several expeditions to sub-Anatarctic islands - including the 1907 Sub-Antarctic Islands Scientific Expedition, New Guinea, and the Australian interior. By the time Waite's employment ended at the Australian Museum, the collection contained 18,000 specimens. He was later the Curator of the Canterbury Museum in New Zealand for eight years, before accepting the Directorship at the South Australian Museum in March 1914.

Waite was the first Australian ichthyologist to use detailed illustrations in his papers. During his career, he published around 140 papers, more than half were on fish. His major contribution to Australian ichthyology was The Fishes of South Australia (1923).

Waite contracted malaria while in New Guinea, and suffered from poor health from that time. He died on 19 January 1928 in Highbury Hospital, Hobart from enteric fever.He was not related to Peter Waite, whose endowment made the Waite Institute a reality.

A species of Australian blind snake, Anilios waitii, is named in his honour.

== Taxon described by him ==
- See Category:Taxa named by Edgar Ravenswood Waite

== Taxon named in his honor ==
- The Spotty-face anchovy, Stolephorus waitei D. S. Jordan & Seale, 1926, is a species of ray-finned fish in the family Engraulidae. It is found in the Indo-Pacific.
- Waite's pipefish, Corythoichthys waitei Jordan & Seale, 1906 is a species of Indo-Pacific pipefish from the family Syngnathidae which is found from the Philippines east to Samoa, south to Papua New Guinea.
