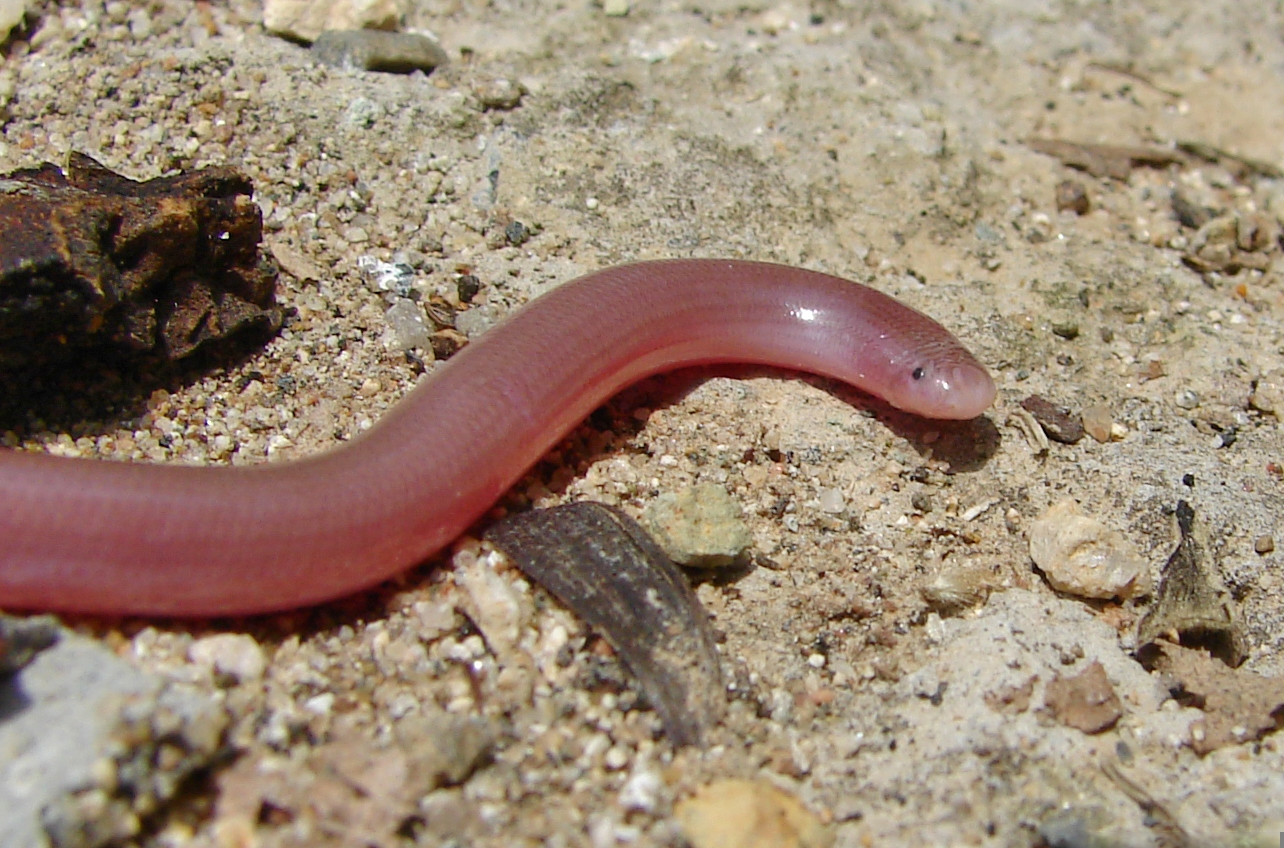
- European blind snake (Xerotyphlops vermicularis)

Scientific classification
- Kingdom: Animalia
- Phylum: Chordata
- Order: Squamata
- Suborder: Serpentes
- Infraorder: Scolecophidia
- Superfamily: Typhlopoidea
- Family: Typhlopidae; Merrem, 1820

Synonyms
- Typhlopidae Merrem, 1820; Typhlopina J.P. Müller, 1832; Typhlopsidae Gray, 1845; Typhlopidae — Jan, 1863; Typhlopidae — de Witte, 1962

= Typhlopidae =

Family of snakes

The Typhlopidae are a family of blind snakes. They are found mostly in the tropical regions of Africa, Asia, the Americas, and all mainland Australia and various islands. The rostral scale overhangs the mouth to form a shovel-like burrowing structure. They live underground in burrows, and since they have no use for vision, their eyes are mostly vestigial. They have light-detecting black eye spots, and teeth occur in the upper jaw. Typhlopids do not have dislocatable lower jaw articulations, restricting them to prey smaller than their oral aperture. All species in the family Typhlopidae are fossorial and feed on social fossorial invertebrates such as termites and ants. The tracheal lung is present and chambered in all species. One species, the Brahminy blind snake, is the only unisexual snake, with the entire population being female and reproducing via parthenogenesis. The tail ends with a horn-like scale. Most of these species are oviparous. Currently, 18 genera are recognized containing over 200 species.

== Evolution ==
The Typhlopidae are thought to have originated on Madagascar during the Late Cretaceous, along with their sister group, the Xenotyphlopidae. The common ancestor of both families is thought to have diverged from the Gerrhopilidae earlier in the Cretaceous, when Insular India broke away from Madagascar. Afterwards, the Typhlopidae are thought to have dispersed out of Madagascar (leaving behind a single basal genus, Madatyphlops) into mainland Africa and then Eurasia, in contrast to the Xenotyphlopidae which remained restricted to Madagascar. From these regions, the Typhlopidae went on to colonize the rest of the world, with African typhlopids rafting across the Atlantic to South America during the Paleocene, then colonizing the Caribbean during the Oligocene, while Asian typhlopids colonized Australia from Southeast Asia or Indonesia later in the Oligocene.

=== Fossil record ===
Possible Typhlopid skin has been identified in Dominican amber.

== Geographic range ==
They are found in most tropical and many subtropical regions all over the world, particularly in Africa, Asia, islands in the Pacific, tropical America, and southeastern Europe.

== Genera ==
| Genus | Taxon author | Species | Common name | Geographic range |
|---|---|---|---|---|
| Acutotyphlops | Wallach, 1995 | 5 | | Eastern Papua New Guinea and the Solomon Islands |
| Afrotyphlops | Broadley & Wallach, 2009 | 29 | | sub-Saharan Africa |
| Amerotyphlops | Hedges, Marion, Lipp, Marin & Vidal, 2014 | 19 | | Mexico through South America |
| Anilios | Gray, 1845 | 48 | | Australia and New Guinea. |
| Antillotyphlops | Hedges, Marion, Lipp, Marin & Vidal, 2014 | 12 | | Caribbean islands |
| Argyrophis | Gray, 1845 | 12 | | Asia |
| Cubatyphlops | Hedges, Marion, Lipp, Marin & Vidal, 2014 | 12 | | Caribbean islands |
| Cyclotyphlops | Bosch & Ineich, 1994 | 1 | | Indonesia: Selatan Province, southern Sulawesi |
| Grypotyphlops | W. Peters, 1881 | 1 | | peninsular India |
| Indotyphlops | Hedges, Marion, Lipp, Marin & Vidal, 2014 | 23 | | Asia |
| Letheobia | Cope, 1869 | 37 | | Africa and the Middle East |
| Madatyphlops | Hedges, Marion, Lipp, Marin & Vidal, 2014 | 15 | | Madagascar, the Comoro Islands, Mauritius |
| Malayotyphlops | Hedges, Marion, Lipp, Marin & Vidal, 2014 | 12 | | the Philippines and Indonesia |
| Ramphotyphlops | Fitzinger, 1843 | 22 | long-tailed blind snakes | southern and southeast Asia, as well as many islands in the southern Pacific Ocean |
| Rhinotyphlops | Fitzinger, 1843 | 7 | | Africa |
| Sundatyphlops | Hedges, Marion, Lipp, Marin & Vidal, 2014 | 1 | | Indonesia and East Timor |
| Typhlops^{T} | Oppel, 1811 | 20 | | the West Indies |
| Xerotyphlops | Hedges, Marion, Lipp, Marin & Vidal, 2014 | 6 | | Palearctic |

^{T}Type genus

=== Former genera ===
Xenotyphlops, formerly classified in the Typhlopidae, is now classed in the Xenotyphlopidae.

== See also ==
- List of typhlopid species and subspecies
