= Typhlops russellii =

Typhlops russellii is a taxonomic synonym that may refer to:

- Ramphotyphlops braminus, a.k.a. the brahminy blind snake, a harmless species found mostly in Africa and Asia, but has been introduced in many other parts of the world
- Rhinotyphlops acutus, a.k.a. the beak nosed worm snake, a harmless species endemic to peninsular India
