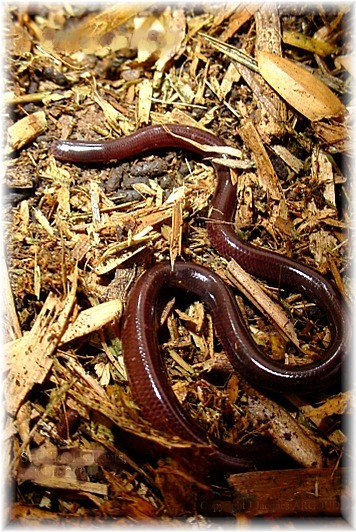
- Brahminy blind snake, Ramphotyphlops braminus

Scientific classification
- Kingdom: Animalia
- Phylum: Chordata
- Class: Reptilia
- Order: Squamata
- Suborder: Serpentes
- Infraorder: Scolecophidia; Cope, 1864

Families
- See text

= Scolecophidia =

Scolecophidia Temporal range: 87.8–0 Ma Late Cretaceous - present (but see text)

Infraorder of snakes

The Scolecophidia, commonly known as blind snakes or thread snakes, are an infraorder of snakes. They range in length from 10 to 100 centimeters (4 to 40 inches). All are fossorial (adapted for burrowing). Five families and 39 genera are recognized. The Scolecophidia infraorder is most-likely paraphyletic (with the family Anomalepididae recovered with strong support as sister clade to the 'typical snakes').

== Taxonomy ==
The infraorder name Scolecophidia derives from the two Ancient Greek words σκώληξ or σκώληκος (skṓlēx, genitive skṓlēkos), meaning "earthworm", and ὄφις (óphis), meaning "snake". It refers to their shape and fossorial lifestyle.

=== Families ===
Family	Authority	Genera	Common name	Geographic range
Anomalepididae	Taylor, 1939	4	primitive blind snakes	Southern Central America and South America
Gerrhopilidae	Vidal, Wynn, Donnellan & Hedges, 2010	2	Indo-Malayan blind snakes	India, Southeast Asia, Indonesia, the Philippines, and New Guinea
Leptotyphlopidae	Stejneger, 1892	13	slender blind snakes or threadsnakes	Africa, western Asia, and the Americas
Typhlopidae	Merrem, 1820	18	long-tailed blind snakes	Most tropical and many subtropical regions all over the world
Xenotyphlopidae	Vidal, Vences, Branch & Hedges, 2010	1	Malagasy blind snakes	Madagascar

=== Evolution ===
Despite only having fossils as early as the Cretaceous, Scolecophidia itself likely originated in the Middle Jurassic, with Anomalepididae, Leptotyphlopidae, and Typhlopoidea diverging from one another during the Late Jurassic. Within Typhlopoidea, Gerrhopilidae likely diverged from the Xenotyphlopidae-Typhlopidae clade during the Early Cretaceous, and Xenotyphlopidae and Typhlopidae likely diverged from one another during the Late Cretaceous.

Scolecophidians are believed to have originated on Gondwana, with anomalepidids and leptotyphlopids evolving in west Gondwana (South America and Africa) and the Typhlopoidea (typhlopids, gerrhopilids, and xenotyphlopids) on east Gondwana, initially on the combined India/Madagascar land mass, during the Mesozoic. Typhlopids, initially isolated on Madagascar, then dispersed to Africa and Eurasia. South American typhlopids appear to have evolved from African typhlopids that rafted across the Atlantic about 60 million years ago; they, in turn, dispersed to the Caribbean about 33 million years ago. Similarly, typhlopids appear to have reached Australia from Southeast Asia or Indonesia about 28 million years ago. Meanwhile, the gerrhopilids, isolated on Insular India, underwent a radiation throughout tropical Asia following the collision of India with Asia, while the xenotyphlopids remained isolated on Madagascar.

The Malagasy typhlopoids (Madatyphlops in Typhlopidae and Xenotyphlops in Xenotyphlopidae) are among the only extant terrestrial vertebrates on Madagascar whose isolation occurred due to vicariance from the Cretaceous breakup of Gondwana. The only other terrestrial vertebrate on Madagascar that shares this evolutionary history is the Madagascan big-headed turtle (Erymnochelys madagascariensis); all other Malagasy land vertebrates dispersed from the mainland to an already-isolated Madagascar from the latest Cretaceous to the present.

=== Fossil record ===
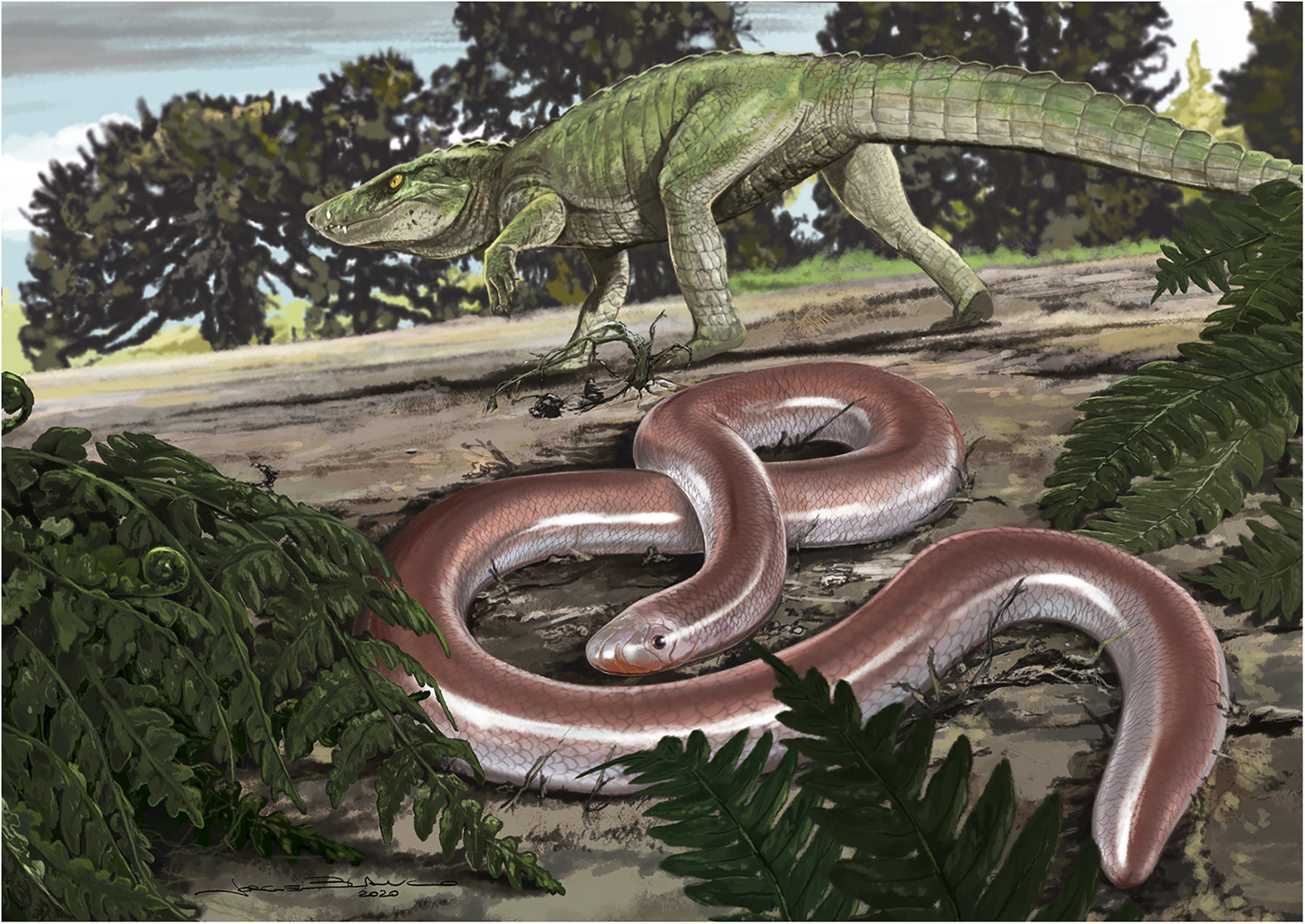
Illustration of Boipeba, the earliest known fossil blind snake

The extinct fossil species Boipeba tayasuensis from the Late Cretaceous of Brazil was described in 2020, marking the earliest fossil record of Scolecophidia. It was a sister group to Typhlopoidea and was over 1 meter in length, making it much larger than most modern blindsnakes, with only Afrotyphlops schlegelii and Afrotyphlops mucruso rivaling it in size. Prior to this, the earliest scolecophidian fossils were only known from the Paleocene of Morocco and the Eocene of Europe.

Possible Typhopid skin has been identified in Dominican amber.

=== Phylogeny ===
This phylogeny combines the ones recovered by Vidal et al. in 2010 and Fachini et al. in 2020.

- Scolecophidia
  - Anomalepididae
  - - Leptotyphlopidae
    - - †Boipeba
      - Typhlopoidea
        - Gerrhopilidae
        - - Xenotyphlopidae
          - Typhlopidae

== Description ==
The common name of Scolecophidia, blind snakes, is based on their shared characteristic of reduced eyes that are located under their head scales. These head scales are found in all snakes and are referred to as spectacles, but within this infraorder, they are opaque, resulting in decreased visual capabilities. Reduced eyes of the Scolecophidia have been attributed to evolutionary origins of snakes, which are hypothesized to have arisen from fossorial ancestors, causing a loss of genes related to eyesight that later evolved again in higher snakes to be similar to other vertebrates due to convergent evolution. Newer research shows that seven of the 12 genes associated with bright-light vision in most snakes and lizards are not present in this infraorder, and the common ancestor of all snakes had better eyesight. Other shared characteristics include an absent left oviduct in four of the five families, aside from the Anomalepididae, which have a well developed yet reduced left oviduct. Aside from this, these snakes range in length from 10 to 100 cm (4 to 39 in). Their typical body shapes include slender, cylindrical bodies and small, narrow heads. All these families either lack or have a vestigial left lung and lack cranial infrared receptors.

== Behavior ==
The main shared characteristic found across all Scolecophidia is a fossorial nature, either living underground or within logs and leaf litter. Aside from this, thus far the reproduction remains understudied with all Scolecophidia studied thus far being noted to be oviparous, with elongate eggs noted in both leptotyphlopids and typhlopids. Foraging behaviors vary across families, but all feed on invertebrates. Some of their main food sources include ant or termite eggs, which are tracked down by following chemical cues left by these invertebrates to create trails. Tricheilostomata macrolepis has been seen climbing up trees and waving its head side to side vertically to detect chemical cues in the air to locate insect nests. In a study on the Leptotyphlopidae, some species were found to specialize in eating only termites or ants; some rely on binge feeding patterns, while others do not. While these snakes are often difficult to locate due to their burrowing habits, they are more often seen above ground after rain due to flooding that occurs in burrows. The ancestral nature of the Scolecophidia has resulted in the use of these organisms as models for evolutionary studies in Serpentes to better understand evolution of reproduction, morphology, and feeding habits.
