= Afrotyphlops blanfordii =

Conservation status
- Data Deficient (IUCN 3.1)

Scientific classification
- Kingdom: Animalia
- Phylum: Chordata
- Class: Reptilia
- Order: Squamata
- Suborder: Serpentes
- Family: Typhlopidae
- Genus: Afrotyphlops
- Species: A. blanfordii

Binomial name
- Afrotyphlops blanfordii (Boulenger, 1899)

Synonyms
- Typhlops blanfordii Boulenger, 1899; Afrotyphlops blanfordii — Broadley & Wallach, 2009

Species of reptile

Afrotyphlops blanfordii, commonly known as Blanford's blind-snake, is a species of snake in the family Typhlopidae. The species is native to the Horn of Africa.

== Geographic range ==
Afrotyphlops blanfordii is found in Eritrea and Ethiopia, at elevations of 980–2,450 m (3,220–8,040 ft) above sea level.

== Etymology ==
The specific name, blanfordii, is in honour of English naturalist William Thomas Blanford.

== Taxonomy ==
Afrotyphlops blanfordii is similar to Afrotyphlops lineolatus, and the two may even be conspecific.

== Description ==
Afrotyphlops blanfordii may attain a total length (including a short tail) of 32 cm (13 in). Dorsally, the body is olive-grey, with the basal half of each dorsal scale blackish. Ventrally, it has a narrow whitish strip running down the middle.

== Habitat ==
The preferred natural habitats of A. blanfordii are grassland, shrubland, and forest.

== Behaviour ==
Afrotyphlops blanfordii is fossorial and terrestrial.

== Reproduction ==
Afrotyphlops blanfordii is oviparous.
