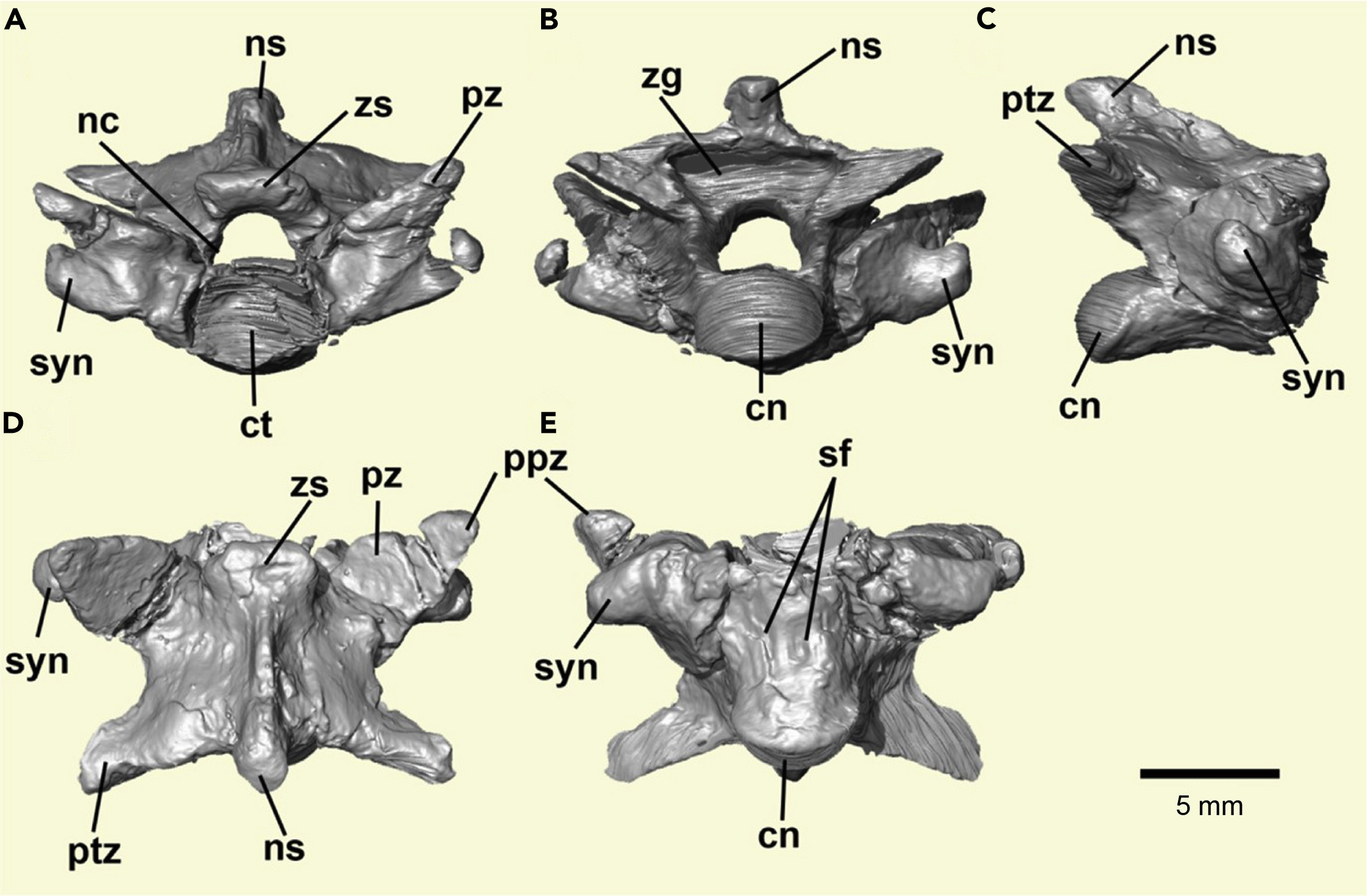

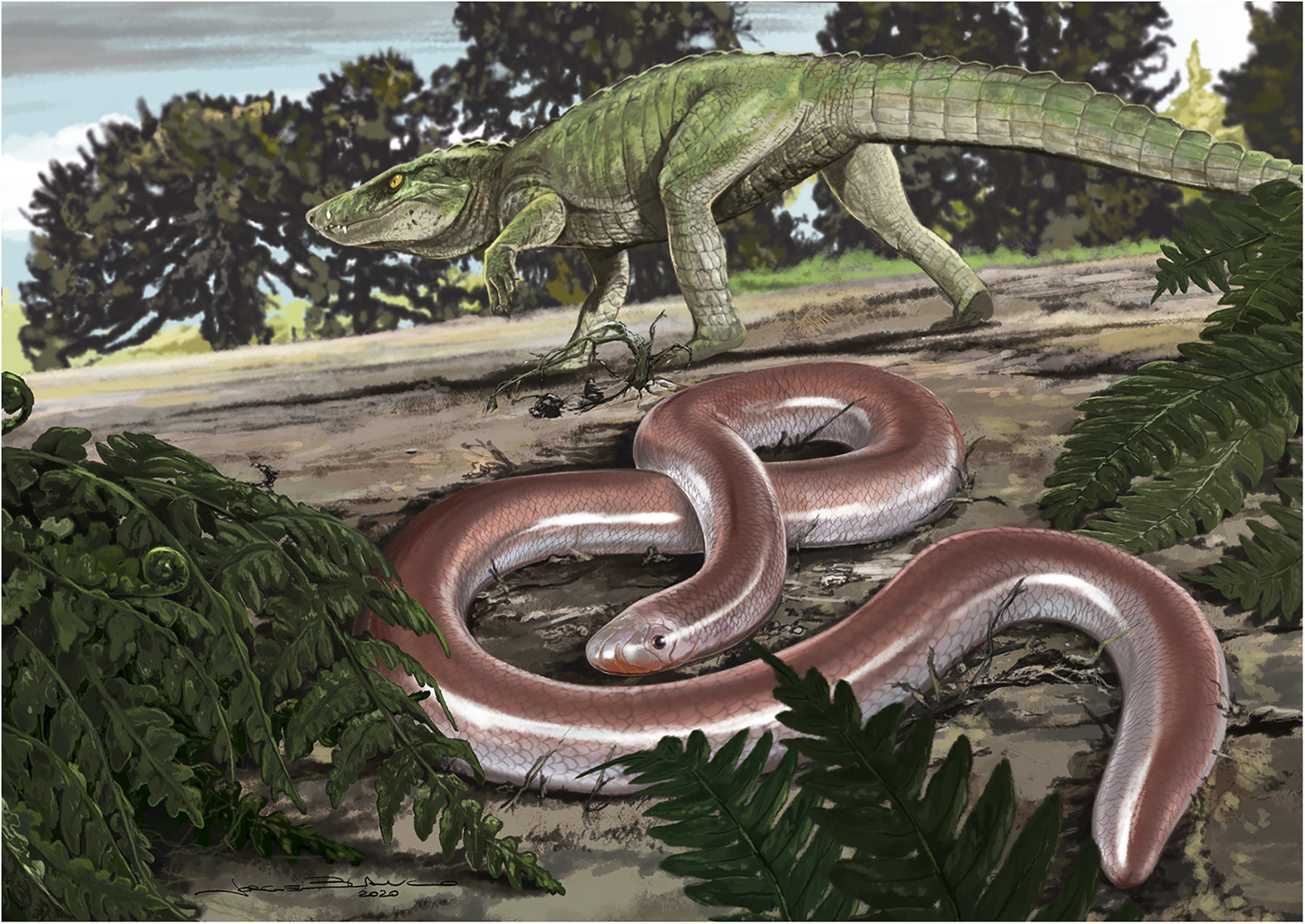
- Life restoration, alongside Montealtosuchus

Scientific classification
- Kingdom: Animalia
- Phylum: Chordata
- Class: Reptilia
- Order: Squamata
- Suborder: Serpentes
- Infraorder: Scolecophidia
- Genus: †Boipeba; Fachini, Onary, Palci, Lee, Bronzati & Hsiou, 2020
- Species: †B. tayasuensis

Binomial name
- †Boipeba tayasuensis Fachini, Onary, Palci, Lee, Bronzati & Hsiou, 2020

= Boipeba tayasuensis =

Boipeba Temporal range: Late Cretaceous, 88 Ma

Extinct genus of snakes

Boipeba is an extinct genus of blind snake from the Late Cretaceous (post-Turonian) of Brazil. It contains a single species, Boipeba tayasuensis. The species is known from a single precloacal vertebra from the Adamantina Formation of northwestern São Paulo.

== Etymology ==
The genus name, Boipeba, is Tupi-Guarani for "flat snake". The specific epithet tayasuensis refers to the species' discovery in Taiaçu municipality.

== Taxonomy ==
Boipeba was a scolecophidian, belonging to the same group that contains modern blind snakes. Phylogenetic analyses indicate a deep (Late Jurassic or Early Cretaceous) divergence between blind snakes and all other extant snakes, but until Boipeba's discovery, there was no known fossil evidence of blind snakes during the Mesozoic.

Boipeba is thought to be the sister group to the Typhlopoidea, being more derived than Anomalepididae and Leptotyphlopidae, but basal to all other blind snake families. The discovery of Boipeba in Brazil supports the idea that the Typhlopoidea may have originated in Gondwana.

== Description ==
One of Boipeba's distinguishing features is its large size compared to modern blind snakes; only the extant Afrotyphlops schlegelii and Afrotyphlops mucruso of Africa rival it in size (about 1 meter in length). This indicates that early blind snakes may have been large in size, and only later underwent miniaturization.
