= Xenotyphlops grandidieri =

Conservation status
- Critically Endangered (IUCN 3.1)

Scientific classification
- Kingdom: Animalia
- Phylum: Chordata
- Class: Reptilia
- Order: Squamata
- Suborder: Serpentes
- Family: Xenotyphlopidae
- Genus: Xenotyphlops
- Species: X. grandidieri

Binomial name
- Xenotyphlops grandidieri (Mocquard, 1905)

Synonyms
- Typhlops Grandidieri Mocquard, 1905; Typhlops grandidieri — Boulenger, 1915; Xenotyphlops grandidieri — Wallach & Ineich, 1996; Xenotyphlops mocquardi Wallach, Mercurio & Andreone, 2007; Xenotyphlops grandidieri — Wegener et al., 2013

Species of reptile

Xenotyphlops grandidieri is a species of blind snake in the family Xenotyphlopidae. The species is endemic to Madagascar. There are no subspecies that are recognized as being valid.

== Taxonomy ==
In addition to having no subspecies, X. grandidieri is the only species in the genus Xenotyphlops, which is the only genus in the family Xenotyphlopidae. Therefore, X. grandidieri is a monotypic species in a monotypic genus in a monotypic family.

== Etymology ==
The specific name, grandidieri, is in honor of French naturalist Alfred Grandidier.

== Geographic range ==
X. grandidieri is found in northern Madagascar.

For over 100 years X. grandidieri was known only from the type specimens and the vague type locality "Madagascar".

== Habitat ==
The preferred natural habitat of X. grandidieri is shrubland or forest on sand dunes or with sandy soil, at altitudes from sea level to 50 m (160 ft).

== Reproduction ==
X. grandidieri is oviparous.
