= Steinhaus's blind snake =

Conservation status
- Least Concern (IUCN 3.1)

Scientific classification
- Kingdom: Animalia
- Phylum: Chordata
- Class: Reptilia
- Order: Squamata
- Suborder: Serpentes
- Family: Typhlopidae
- Genus: Afrotyphlops
- Species: A. steinhausi

Binomial name
- Afrotyphlops steinhausi F. Werner, 1909

Synonyms
- Typhlops steinhausi F. Werner, 1909; Rhinotyphlops steinhausi — Chirio & Ineich, 2006; Afrotyphlops steinhausi — Broadley & Wallach, 2009

Species of snake

Steinhaus's worm snake (Afrotyphlops steinhausi) is a species of snake in the family Typhlopidae. The species is endemic to Central Africa.

== Etymology ==
The specific name, steinhausi, is in honor of German marine biologist Carl Otto Steinhaus (1870–1919) of the Naturhistorisches Museum zu Hamburg.

== Geographic range ==
A. steinhausi is found in Cameroon, Central African Republic, Democratic Republic of the Congo, Nigeria, and Republic of the Congo.

== Reproduction ==
A. steinhausi is oviparous.
