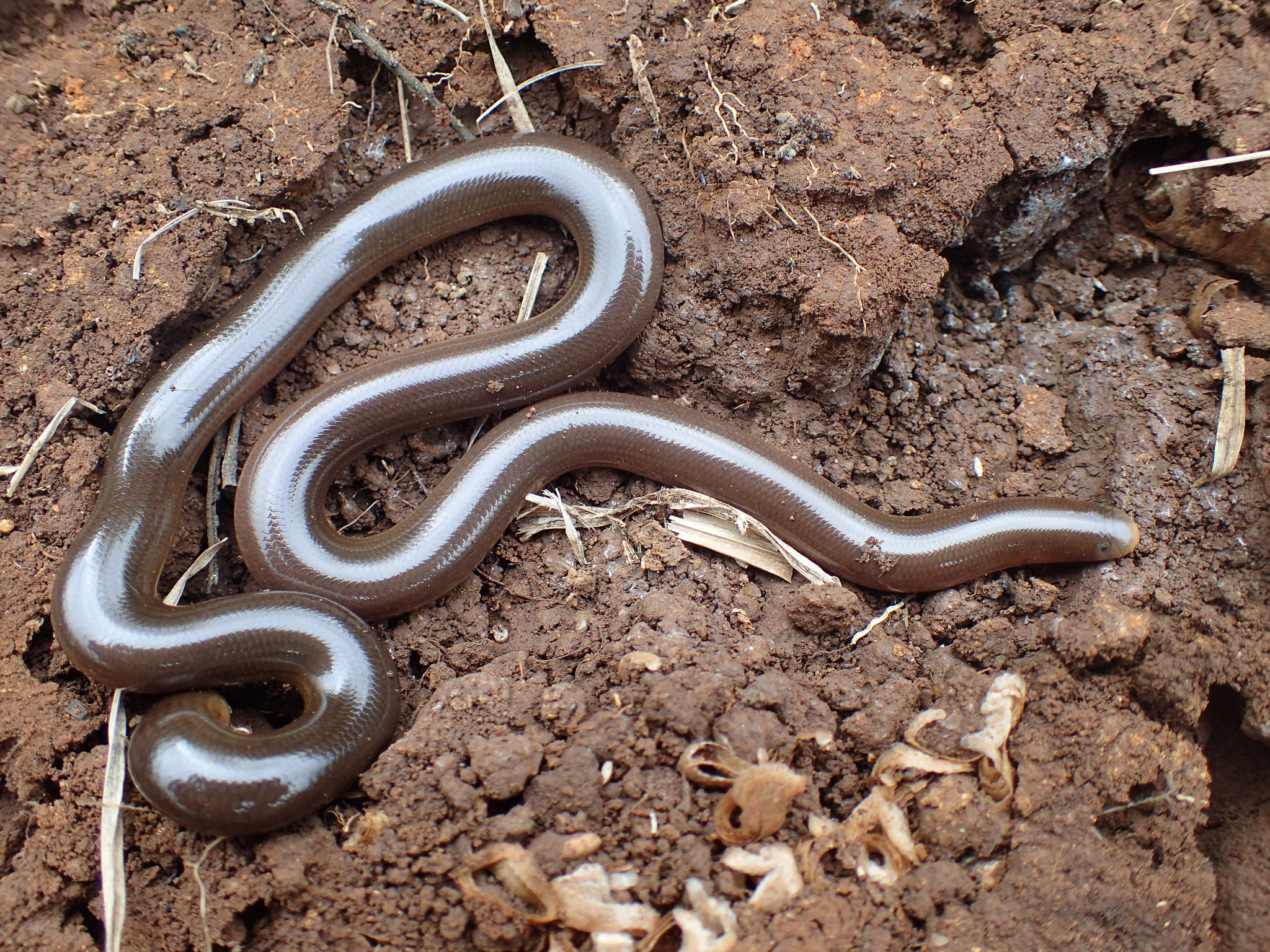

Conservation status
- Least Concern (IUCN 3.1)

Scientific classification
- Kingdom: Animalia
- Phylum: Chordata
- Class: Reptilia
- Order: Squamata
- Suborder: Serpentes
- Family: Typhlopidae
- Genus: Afrotyphlops
- Species: A. bibronii

Binomial name
- Afrotyphlops bibronii (A. Smith, 1846)

Synonyms
- Onycocephalus bibronii A. Smith, 1846; Typhlops bibronii — Boulenger, 1893; Afrotyphlops bibronii — Broadley & Wallach, 2007

= Bibron's blind snake =

Species of snake

Bibron's blind snake (Afrotyphlops bibronii) is a species of snake in the family Typhlopidae. The species is native to southern Africa.

== Etymology ==
The specific name, bibronii, is in honor of French herpetologist Gabriel Bibron.

== Geographic range ==
A. bibronii is found in extreme southeastern Botswana, eastern and northern South Africa, Lesotho, Eswatini, and eastern Zimbabwe, and possibly Mozambique.

== Description ==
A heavy-bodied species of blind snake, A. bibronii is dark olive-brown to brown dorsally, and is paler ventrally. Adults are darker than juveniles. Adults may attain a snout-vent length (SVL) of 29.5 cm (11 5/8 in). Its scales are arranged in 30 rows around the body, and there are more than 300 scales in the middorsal row.

The snout is very prominent, with an angular but not sharp edge, below which are located the nostrils. The rostral is very large, extending posteriorly as far as the eyes. The portion of the rostral visible from above is broader than long. The nasals are semidivided, the suture proceeding from the first upper labial. One preocular is present, which is narrower than the nasal or the ocular, and in contact with the second upper labial. There are four upper labials. The eye is distinct, below the suture between the ocular and the preocular. The prefrontal is much larger than the supraoculars and the parietals, which are larger than the body scales. The diameter of the body goes 28 to 36 times into the total length. The tail is short, as broad as long, or broader than long, ending in a spine.

== Habitat ==
The preferred natural habitats of A. bibronii are coastal grasslands and the Highveld, at altitudes from sea level to 2,000 m (6,600 ft).

== Behavior ==
Bibron's blind snake is fossorial, and will burrow into brood chambers of termites and ants. It is protected from the bites of soldier ants by its close-fitting, shiny scales. It is often flushed to the surface of its burrow after heavy rains or flood.

== Diet ==
A. bibronii feeds on larvae and eggs of termites and ants.

== Reproduction ==
A. bibronii is oviparous. Mature females lay eggs from January through March, which is late Summer in southern Africa. Clutch size varies from 5 to 14. Each egg measures about 43 mm × 10 mm (1 11/16 in × 3/8 in). The embryos within the eggs are well-developed, and the shell walls are thin. The female may remain with the eggs, guarding them until hatching. After only 5–6 days, the hatchlings emerge, with an average total length (including tail) of 11.5 cm (4 1/2 in).

== See also ==
- List of herpetologists
