= Liwale blind snake =

Conservation status
- Least Concern (IUCN 3.1)

Scientific classification
- Kingdom: Animalia
- Phylum: Chordata
- Class: Reptilia
- Order: Squamata
- Suborder: Serpentes
- Family: Typhlopidae
- Genus: Afrotyphlops
- Species: A. tanganicanus

Binomial name
- Afrotyphlops tanganicanus (Laurent, 1964)

Synonyms
- Typhlops schmidtii tanganicanus Laurent, 1964; Typhlops lineolatus tanganicanus; Typhlops tanganicanus

Species of reptile

The Liwale blind-snake (Afrotyphlops tanganicanus) is a species of snake in the family Typhlopidae. It is endemic to southeastern Tanzania.
