= Reuter's blind snake =

Conservation status
- Data Deficient (IUCN 3.1)

Scientific classification
- Kingdom: Animalia
- Phylum: Chordata
- Class: Reptilia
- Order: Squamata
- Suborder: Serpentes
- Family: Typhlopidae
- Genus: Madatyphlops
- Species: M. reuteri

Binomial name
- Madatyphlops reuteri (Boettger, 1881)

Synonyms
- Typhlops reuteri Boettger, 1881; Typhlops lenzi Boettger, 1882; Madatyphlops reuteri — Hedges et al., 2014; Lemuriatyphlops reuteri — Pyron & Wallach, 2014; Madatyphlops reuteri — Nagy et al., 2015

Species of snake

Reuter's blind snake (Madatyphlops reuteri), also known commonly as Reuter's worm snake, is a species of snake in the family Typhlopidae.

== Etymology ==
The specific name, reuteri, is in honor of "C. Reuter" who collected the holotype.

== Geographic range ==
M. reuteri is endemic to the Madagascan island Nosy Be.

== Reproduction ==
M. reuteri is oviparous.
