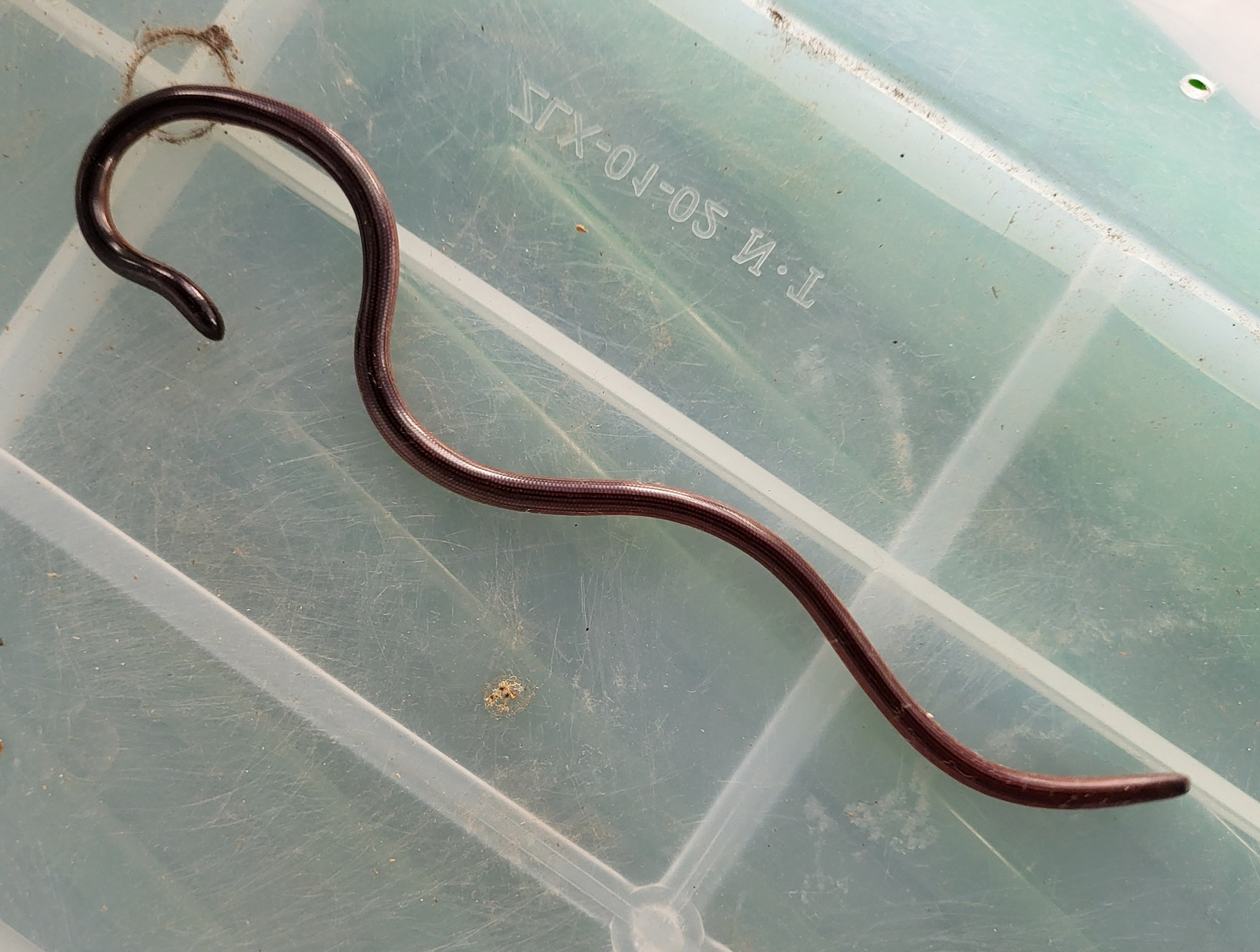

Conservation status
- Least Concern (IUCN 3.1)

Scientific classification
- Kingdom: Animalia
- Phylum: Chordata
- Class: Reptilia
- Order: Squamata
- Suborder: Serpentes
- Family: Typhlopidae
- Genus: Afrotyphlops
- Species: A. obtusus

Binomial name
- Afrotyphlops obtusus (Peters, 1865)

Synonyms
- Typhlops (Onychocephalus) obtusus Peters, 1865; Typhlops obtusus — Boulenger, 1893; Letheobia obtusa — Broadley & Wallach, 2007

= Afrotyphlops obtusus =

Species of snake

Afrotyphlops obtusus, also known as the slender blind snake or southern gracile blind-snake, is a species of snake in the Typhlopidae family. It is endemic to East Africa.

== Geographic range ==
It is found in southern Malawi, northern Mozambique, and eastern Zimbabwe.

== Description ==
Dorsally, it is dark brown, with the base of each scale paler. Ventrally, it is pale brown to cream-colored. Maximum snout-vent length (SVL) is 37 cm (14 1/2 in). The scales are arranged in 24 or 26 rows around the body, and there are more than 300 scales in the vertebral row.

Snout very prominent, rounded. Nostrils located inferiorly (ventrally). Rostral large, more than half as broad as the head; portion of rostral visible from below as long as broad. Nasal semidivided, the cleft proceeding from the first upper labial. Preocular much narrower than the nasal or the ocular, in contact with the second and third upper labials. Four upper labials. Eyes not distinguishable. Prefrontals and supraoculars broad. Diameter of body 43 to 50 times in the total length. Tail broader than long, ending in a spine.

== Habitat ==
This species prefers loose humic soil in forests. It has been found in coastal, gallery and montane forest, Miombo woodland, and even in urban compost heaps.
