= Angolan giant blind snake =

Conservation status
- Least Concern (IUCN 3.1)

Scientific classification
- Kingdom: Animalia
- Phylum: Chordata
- Class: Reptilia
- Order: Squamata
- Suborder: Serpentes
- Family: Typhlopidae
- Genus: Afrotyphlops
- Species: A. anomalus

Binomial name
- Afrotyphlops anomalus (Bocage, 1873)

Synonyms
- Onychocephalus anomalus Bocage, 1873; Typhlops anchietae Bocage, 1886; Typhlops anomalus – Boulenger, 1893; Rhinotyphlops anomalus – Roux-Estève, 1974; Megatyphlops anomalus – Broadley & Wallach, 2009

Species of snake

The Angolan giant blind snake or Angolan giant blind-snake (Afrotyphlops anomalus), also known as the anomalous beaked snake, is a species of snake in the Typhlopidae family. It is endemic to Angola. Its classification was changed from Rhinotyphlops to Megatyphlops when Rhinotyphlops was found to be polyphyletic. In 2014 Megatyphlops was changed to Afrotyphlops.

== Geographic range ==
It is found in southwestern Angola.
