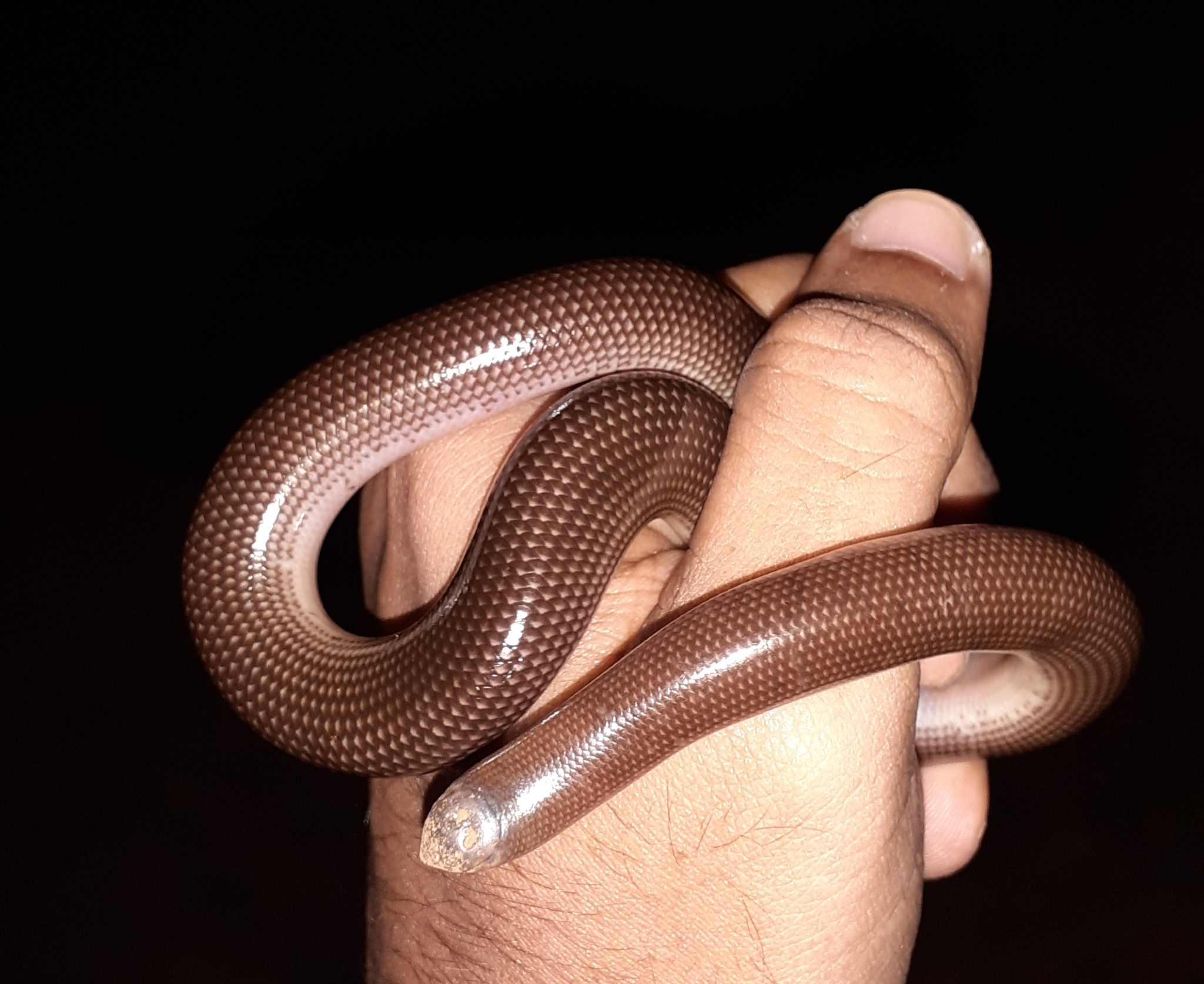

Conservation status
- Least Concern (IUCN 3.1)

Scientific classification
- Kingdom: Animalia
- Phylum: Chordata
- Class: Reptilia
- Order: Squamata
- Suborder: Serpentes
- Family: Typhlopidae
- Genus: Grypotyphlops; Peters, 1881
- Species: G. acutus

Binomial name
- Grypotyphlops acutus (A.M.C. Duméril & Bibron, 1844)

Synonyms
- Onychocephalus acutus A.M.C. Duméril & Bibron, 1884; Typhlops Russellii Gray, 1845; Onychocephalus westermanni Lütken, 1862; Onychocephalus acutus; Günther, 1864; T[yphlops]. excipiens Jan In Jan & Sordelli, 1865; Onychocephalus malabaricus Beddome In Günther, 1875; Gr[ypotyphlops]. acutus; Peters, 1881; Typhlops acutus - F. Müller, 1885; Typhlops acutus - Boulenger, 1893; Gryptotyphlops acutus; Boulenger, 1893; Typhlops psittacus Werner, 1903; Typhlops acuta - Constable, 1949; Typhlops acutus; Rajendran, 1967; [Typhlina] acutus - Whitaker, 1978; Typhlops acutus - Murthy, 1983; Rhinotyphlops acutus; Wallach, 1994; Letheobia acutus (Duméril & Bibron, 1844)

= Grypotyphlops acutus =

Beaked blind snake

Species of snake

Grypotyphlops acutus, also known as the beaked worm snake, beaked blind snake, or beak-nosed worm snake, is a harmless blind snake species endemic to peninsular India. It is the only species in the genus Grypotyphlops. No subspecies are currently recognized.

== Taxonomy ==
Grypotyphlops is thought to group with the African typhlopids in the genera Afrotyphlops, Letheobia, and Rhinotyphlops, being the sister group to the latter two and having dispersed from Africa to the Indian subcontinent during the Paleogene. This contrasts with the other blind snakes in the Indian subcontinent, which are thought to have either mainland Asian ancestry (Indotyphlops and Argyrophis) or be descended from ancient Gondwanan endemics of Insular India (Gerrhopilus).

== Geographic range ==
This species is found throughout peninsular India south of the Ganges and Rajputana basins. The type locality given is "inconnue" (French for unknown).

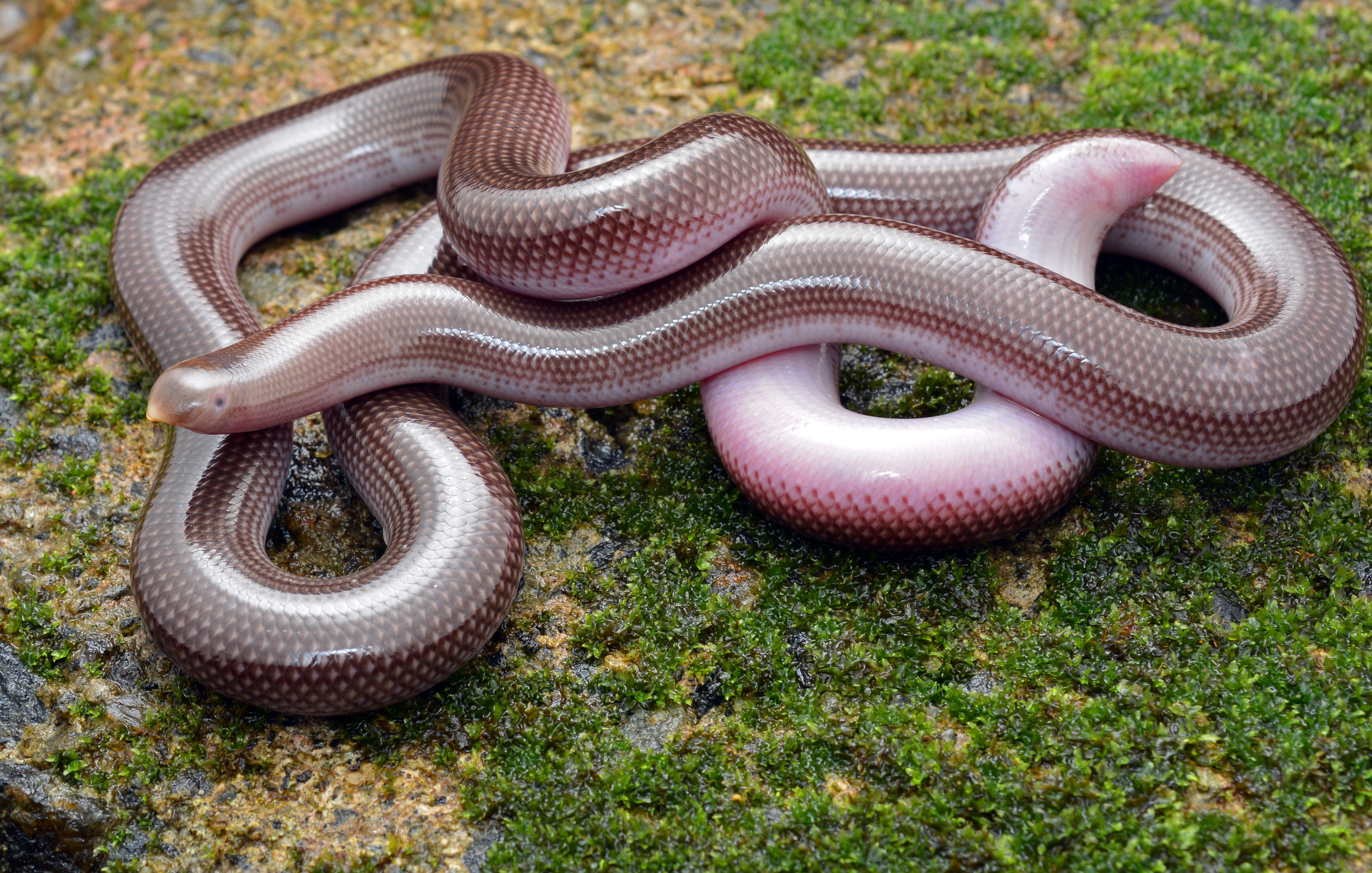
Beaked worm snake(Grypotyphlops acutus) from Kozhikode, Kerala
