= Gierra's blind snake =

Conservation status
- Vulnerable (IUCN 3.1)

Scientific classification
- Kingdom: Animalia
- Phylum: Chordata
- Class: Reptilia
- Order: Squamata
- Suborder: Serpentes
- Family: Typhlopidae
- Genus: Afrotyphlops
- Species: A. gierrai

Binomial name
- Afrotyphlops gierrai Mocquard, 1897

Synonyms
- Typhlops gierrai Mocquard, 1897; Typhlops punctatus gierrai — Barbour & Loveridge, 1928; Typhlops gierrai — Laurent, 1964; Rhinotyphlops gierrai — Broadley & Wallach, 2000; Afrotyphlops gierrai — Broadley & Wallach, 2009

Species of snake

Gierra's blind snake (Afrotyphlops gierrai), also commonly called the Usambara spotted blind snake and the Usambara spotted worm snake, is a species of snake in the family Typhlopidae. The species is endemic to Tanzania.

== Etymology ==
The specific name, gierrai, is in honor of Mr. A. Gierra, an expert in the languages of North Africa and East Africa, who collected the type specimen.

== Geographic range ==
A. gierrai is found in the Ukaguru Mountains, the Ulaguru Mountains, and the Usambara Mountains of Tanzania.

== Habitat ==
The preferred natural habitat of A. gierrai is forest, at altitudes of 600–1,042 m (1,969–3,419 ft).

== Reproduction ==
A. gierrai is oviparous.
