= Madatyphlops domerguei =

Conservation status
- Data Deficient (IUCN 3.1)

Scientific classification
- Kingdom: Animalia
- Phylum: Chordata
- Class: Reptilia
- Order: Squamata
- Suborder: Serpentes
- Family: Typhlopidae
- Genus: Madatyphlops
- Species: M. domerguei

Binomial name
- Madatyphlops domerguei (Roux-Estève, 1980)

Synonyms
- Typhlops domerguei Roux-Estève, 1980; Madatyphlops domerguei — Hedges et al., 2014; Lemuriatyphlops domerguei — Pyron & Wallach, 2014; Madatyphlops domerguei — Nagy et al., 2015

Species of snake

Madatyphlops domerguei is a species of snake in the family Typhlopidae. The species is endemic to Madagascar.

== Etymology ==
The specific name, domerguei, is in honor of French herpetologist Charles Domergue.

== Geographic range ==
M. domerguei is found in southeastern Madagascar.

== Habitat ==
The preferred natural habitat of M. domerguei is forest, at low and medium elevations.

== Reproduction ==
M. domerguei is oviparous.
