= Parker's worm snake =

Conservation status
- Data Deficient (IUCN 3.1)

Scientific classification
- Kingdom: Animalia
- Phylum: Chordata
- Class: Reptilia
- Order: Squamata
- Suborder: Serpentes
- Family: Typhlopidae
- Genus: Madatyphlops
- Species: M. ocularis

Binomial name
- Madatyphlops ocularis (Parker, 1927)

Synonyms
- Typhlops ocularis

Species of snake

Parker's worm snake (Madatyphlops ocularis) is a species of snake in the Typhlopidae family.
