= Calabresi's blind snake =

Conservation status
- Least Concern (IUCN 3.1)

Scientific classification
- Kingdom: Animalia
- Phylum: Chordata
- Class: Reptilia
- Order: Squamata
- Suborder: Serpentes
- Family: Typhlopidae
- Genus: Afrotyphlops
- Species: A. calabresii

Binomial name
- Afrotyphlops calabresii (Gans & Laurent, 1965)

Synonyms
- Typhlops cuneirostris calabresii Gans & Laurent, 1965; Typhlops calabresii Gans & Laurent, 1965; Madatyphlops calabresii (Gans & Laurent, 1965)

Species of reptile

Calabresi's blind-snake (Afrotyphlops calabresii), also known commonly as the southern wedge-snouted blind snake, is a species of snake in the family Typhlopidae. The species is native to northwestern Somalia, adjacent Ethiopia, and eastern Kenya. The specific name calabresii honours Italian zoologist Enrica Calabresi.

== Description ==
Adults of Afrotyphlops calabresii usually have a total length (tail included) of 14–16 cm (5.5–6.3 in), and the maximum recorded total length is 19 cm (7.5 in). The snout is wedge-shaped and prominent. They eye is visible and large. There are 22 scales around the body at midbody, and 257–302 scales in the vertebral row. It is brown, with a silvery sheen when alive.

== Habitat ==
The preferred natural habitats of Afrotyphlops calabresii are savanna and shrubland, at elevations of 200–1,100 m (660–3,610 ft).

== Behavior ==
Afrotyphlops calabresii is terrestrial and fossorial, burrowing in sand and emerging at night.

== Reproduction ==
Afrotyphlops calabresii is oviparous.
