= Tanga blind snake =

Conservation status
- Data Deficient (IUCN 3.1)

Scientific classification
- Kingdom: Animalia
- Phylum: Chordata
- Class: Reptilia
- Order: Squamata
- Suborder: Serpentes
- Family: Typhlopidae
- Genus: Afrotyphlops
- Species: A. platyrhynchus

Binomial name
- Afrotyphlops platyrhynchus Sternfeld, 1910

Synonyms
- Typhlops platyrhynchus; Madatyphlops platyrhynchus

Species of snake

The Tanga worm snake (Afrotyphlops platyrhynchus) is a species of snake in the Typhlopidae family.
