= Madagascar worm snake =

Conservation status
- Data Deficient (IUCN 3.1)

Scientific classification
- Kingdom: Animalia
- Phylum: Chordata
- Class: Reptilia
- Order: Squamata
- Suborder: Serpentes
- Family: Typhlopidae
- Genus: Madatyphlops
- Species: M. madagascariensis

Binomial name
- Madatyphlops madagascariensis (Boettger, 1877)

Synonyms
- Typhlops madagascariensis

Species of snake

The Madagascar worm snake (Madatyphlops madagascariensis) is a species of snakes in the Typhlopidae family.
