= Somali giant blind snake =

Conservation status
- Least Concern (IUCN 3.1)

Scientific classification
- Kingdom: Animalia
- Phylum: Chordata
- Class: Reptilia
- Order: Squamata
- Suborder: Serpentes
- Family: Typhlopidae
- Genus: Afrotyphlops
- Species: A. brevis

Binomial name
- Afrotyphlops brevis (Scortecci, 1929)

Synonyms
- Typhlops brevis (basionym); Afrotyphlops brevis; Rhinotyphlops brevis; Megatyphlops brevis; Typhlops schlegelii brevis; Rhinotyphlops schlegelii brevis

Species of reptile

The Somali giant blind-snake or Somali giant blind snake (Afrotyphlops brevis), also known as the angle-snouted blind snake, is a species of snake in the Typhlopidae family. It is found in South Sudan, southern Ethiopia, Somalia, Uganda, northern Kenya and now in Tanzania.
