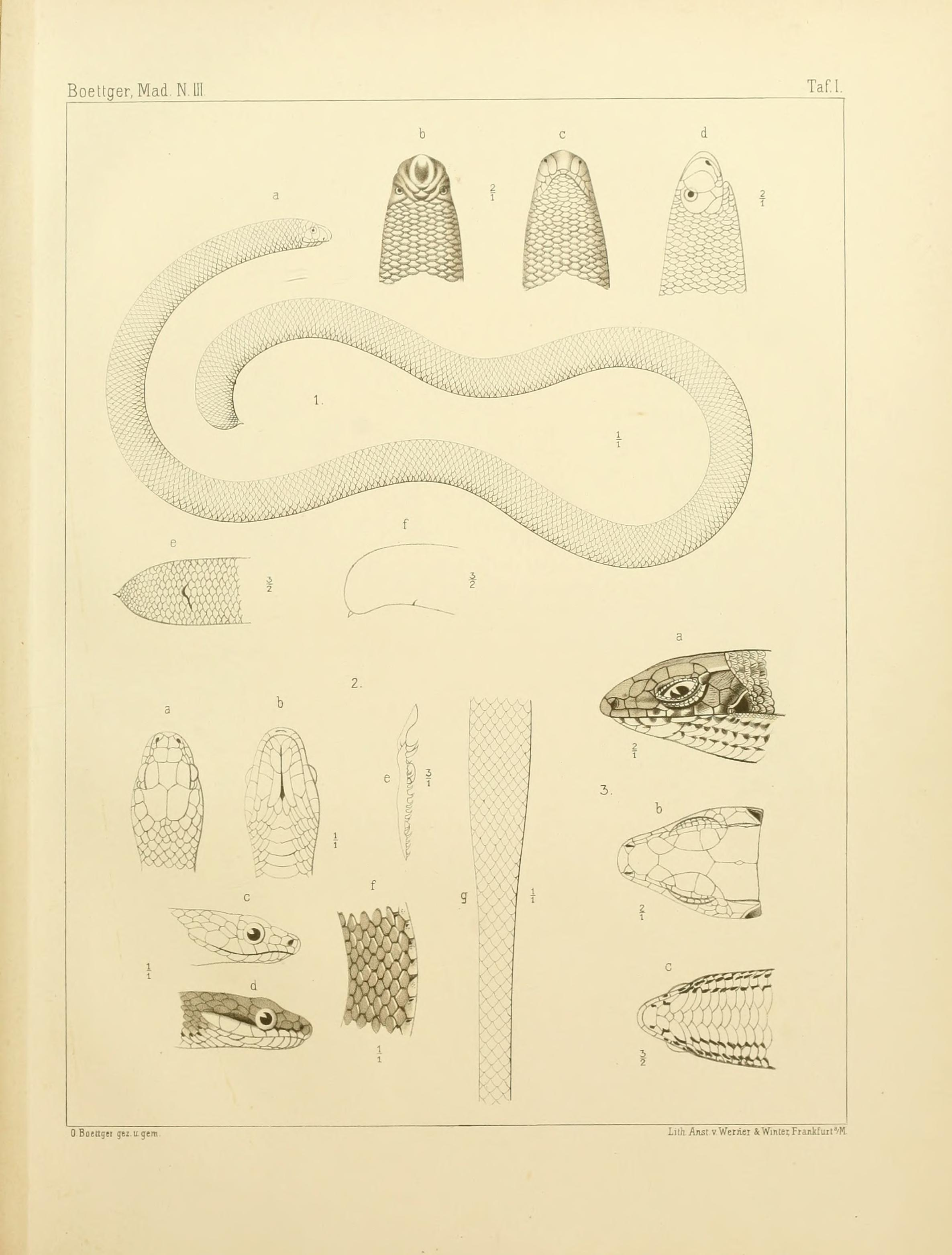
- Fig 2 a-g

Conservation status
- Data Deficient (IUCN 3.1)

Scientific classification
- Kingdom: Animalia
- Phylum: Chordata
- Class: Reptilia
- Order: Squamata
- Suborder: Serpentes
- Family: Typhlopidae
- Genus: Madatyphlops
- Species: M. mucronatus

Binomial name
- Madatyphlops mucronatus (Boettger, 1880)

Synonyms
- Typhlops mucronatus

= Boettger's worm snake =

Species of snake

Boettger's worm snake (Madatyphlops mucronatus) is a species of snake in the family Typhlopidae.
