= Afrotyphlops rouxestevae =

Conservation status
- Data Deficient (IUCN 3.1)

Scientific classification
- Kingdom: Animalia
- Phylum: Chordata
- Class: Reptilia
- Order: Squamata
- Suborder: Serpentes
- Family: Typhlopidae
- Genus: Afrotyphlops
- Species: A. rouxestevae

Binomial name
- Afrotyphlops rouxestevae Trape, 2019

Species of reptile

Afrotyphlops rouxestevae is a species of snake in the Typhlopidae family. It is endemic to Cameroon and only known from the holotype collected from Douala before 1974.

The specific name honours Rolande Roux-Estève, who provided the first description of this taxon in 1974 but did not formally describe it as a new species, pending collection of further specimens.
