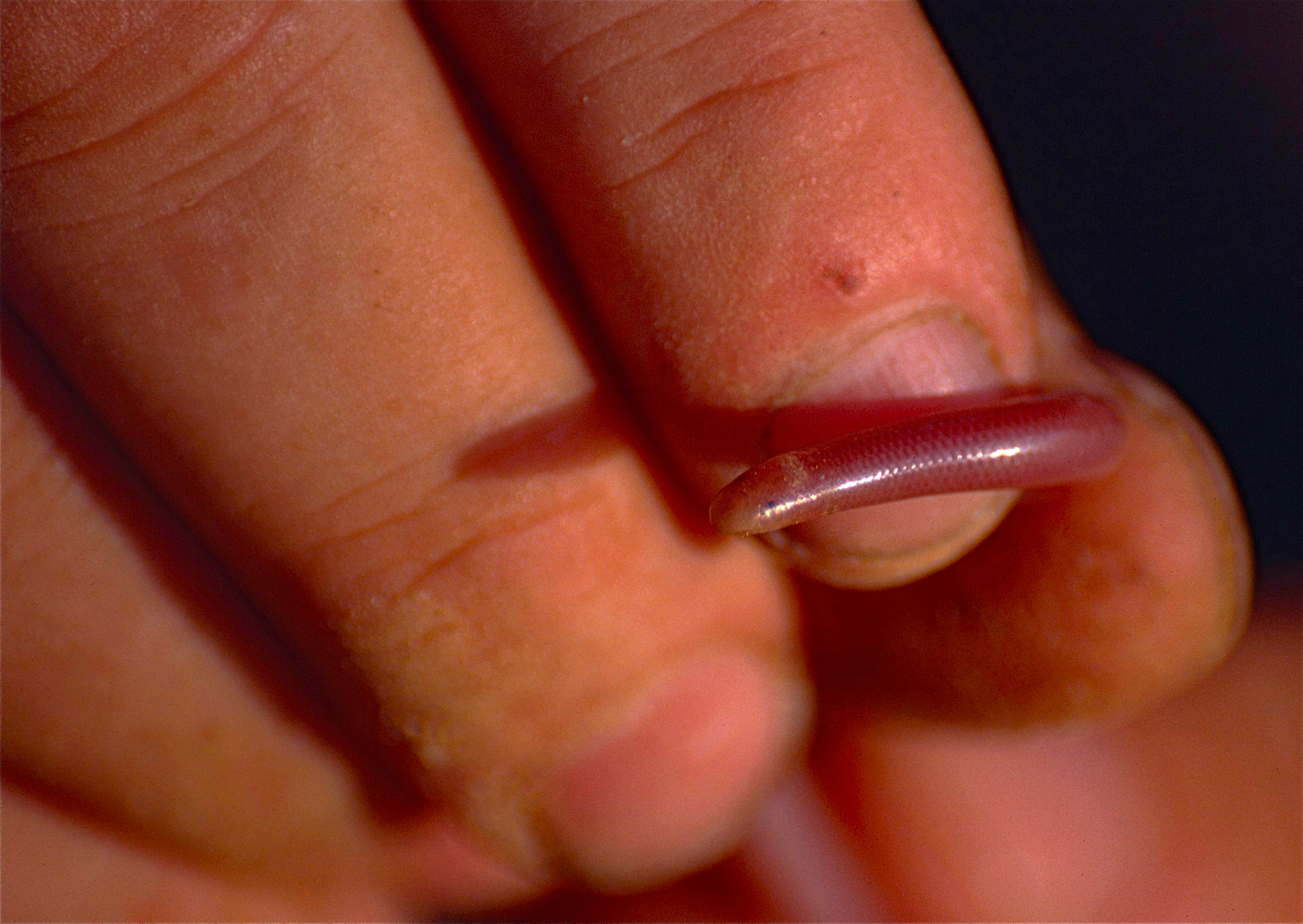
- Madatyphlops arenarius specimen

Scientific classification
- Kingdom: Animalia
- Phylum: Chordata
- Class: Reptilia
- Order: Squamata
- Suborder: Serpentes
- Family: Typhlopidae
- Genus: Madatyphlops; Hedges, Marion, Lipp, Marin & Vidal, 2014

= Madatyphlops =

Genus of snakes

Madatyphlops is a genus of snakes in the family Typhlopidae.

Madatyphlops may represent a surviving clade of the ancestral Typhlopidae, which are thought to have originated on Madagascar during the Cretaceous, before later dispersing to mainland Africa and then worldwide. This makes it, Xenotyphlops, and the Madagascan big-headed turtle the only Malagasy terrestrial vertebrates whose isolation on Madagascar is due to Gondwanan vicariance.

== Geographic range ==
The 15 species of the genus Madatyphlops are found mostly on Madagascar, but also occur on the Comoro Islands. A fossil species occurred on Mauritius.

== Species ==
The following species are recognized as being valid.

- Madatyphlops albanalis (Rendahl, 1918)
- Madatyphlops andasibensis (Wallach & Glaw, 2009)
- Madatyphlops arenarius (Grandidier, 1872)
- Madatyphlops boettgeri (Boulenger, 1893)
- Madatyphlops cariei (Hoffstetter, 1946) – extinct
- Madatyphlops comorensis (Boulenger, 1889)
- Madatyphlops decorsei (Mocquard, 1901)
- Madatyphlops domerguei (Roux-Estève, 1980)
- Madatyphlops eudelini Hawlitschek, Scherz, Webster, Ineich & Glaw, 2021
- Madatyphlops madagascariensis (Boettger, 1877)
- Madatyphlops microcephalus (F. Werner, 1909)
- Madatyphlops mucronatus (Boettger, 1880)
- Madatyphlops ocularis (Parker, 1927)
- Madatyphlops rajeryi (Renoult & Raselimanana, 2009)
- Madatyphlops reuteri (Boettger, 1881)

Nota bene: A binomial authority in parentheses indicates that the species was originally described in a genus other than Madatyphlops.
