= Usambara blotched blind snake =

Conservation status
- Endangered (IUCN 3.1)

Scientific classification
- Kingdom: Animalia
- Phylum: Chordata
- Class: Reptilia
- Order: Squamata
- Suborder: Serpentes
- Family: Typhlopidae
- Genus: Afrotyphlops
- Species: A. usambaricus

Binomial name
- Afrotyphlops usambaricus Laurent, 1964

Synonyms
- Afrotyphlops usambaricus; Typhlops usambaricus; Typhlops boulengeri usambaricus

Species of snake

The Usambara blotched blind-snake (Afrotyphlops usambaricus) is a species of snake in the Typhlopidae family.
