= Blotched blind snake =

Conservation status
- Least Concern (IUCN 3.1)

Scientific classification
- Kingdom: Animalia
- Phylum: Chordata
- Class: Reptilia
- Order: Squamata
- Suborder: Serpentes
- Family: Typhlopidae
- Genus: Afrotyphlops
- Species: A. congestus

Binomial name
- Afrotyphlops congestus (Duméril & Bibron, 1844)

Synonyms
- Onychocephalus congestus (basionym); Onychophis barrowii GRAY 1845; Typhlops congestus; Typhlops punctatus congestus; Rhinotyphlops congestus

Species of snake

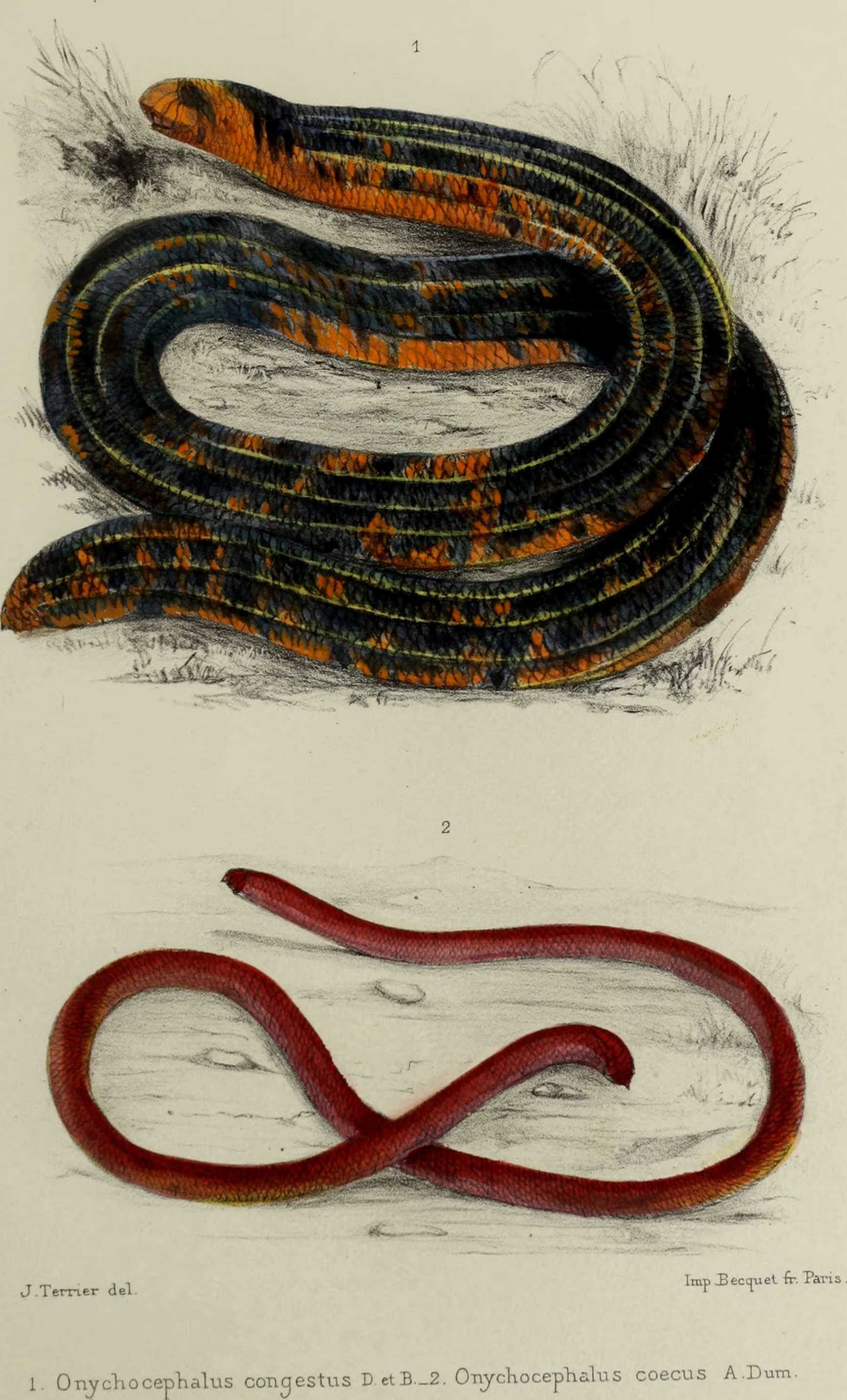
A blotched blind snake (above) and a gabon beaked snake (below)

The blotched blind snake (Afrotyphlops congestus) is a species of snake in the family Typhlopidae. It is distributed from eastern Nigeria through much of Middle Africa to Uganda. It is a fossorial species that occurs in humid forests, and particularly in the east, in gallery forests. It feeds on ants and termites.
