= Comoro worm snake =

Conservation status
- Data Deficient (IUCN 3.1)

Scientific classification
- Kingdom: Animalia
- Phylum: Chordata
- Class: Reptilia
- Order: Squamata
- Suborder: Serpentes
- Family: Typhlopidae
- Genus: Madatyphlops
- Species: M. comorensis

Binomial name
- Madatyphlops comorensis (Boulenger, 1889)

Synonyms
- Typhlops comorensis; Afrotyphlops comorensis

Species of snake

The Comoro worm snake (Madatyphlops comorensis) is a species of snake in the Typhlopidae family. It is endemic to the Comoros, and found only on the islands of Grande Comore and Anjouan.
