= Afrotyphlops chirioi =

Conservation status
- Data Deficient (IUCN 3.1)

Scientific classification
- Kingdom: Animalia
- Phylum: Chordata
- Class: Reptilia
- Order: Squamata
- Suborder: Serpentes
- Family: Typhlopidae
- Genus: Afrotyphlops
- Species: A. chirioi

Binomial name
- Afrotyphlops chirioi Trape, 2019

Species of reptile

Afrotyphlops chirioi is a species of snake in the family Typhlopidae. It is named after Laurent Chirio.

Described in 2019, this species is only known from the southwest Central African Republic. It is known from a mosaic of tropical moist forest and secondary grasslands at 500–600 m (1,600–2,000 ft) above sea level.
