= Wedge-snouted blind snake =

Conservation status
- Data Deficient (IUCN 3.1)

Scientific classification
- Kingdom: Animalia
- Phylum: Chordata
- Class: Reptilia
- Order: Squamata
- Suborder: Serpentes
- Family: Typhlopidae
- Genus: Afrotyphlops
- Species: A. cuneirostris

Binomial name
- Afrotyphlops cuneirostris Peters, 1879

Synonyms
- Typhlops cuneirostris; Madatyphlops cuneirostris

Species of snake

The wedge-snouted blind snake (Afrotyphlops cuneirostris), also known as the wedgenose blind snake, is a species of snake in the Typhlopidae family.
