= Kaimosi blind snake =

Conservation status
- Data Deficient (IUCN 3.1)

Scientific classification
- Kingdom: Animalia
- Phylum: Chordata
- Class: Reptilia
- Order: Squamata
- Suborder: Serpentes
- Family: Typhlopidae
- Genus: Afrotyphlops
- Species: A. kaimosae

Binomial name
- Afrotyphlops kaimosae Loveridge, 1935

Synonyms
- Typhlops brevis; Afrotyphlops kaimosae

Species of reptile

The Kaimosi blind snake (Afrotyphlops kaimosae) is a species of snake in the family Typhlopidae.
