= Bicoloured blind snake =

Conservation status
- Near Threatened (IUCN 3.1)

Scientific classification
- Kingdom: Animalia
- Phylum: Chordata
- Class: Reptilia
- Order: Squamata
- Suborder: Serpentes
- Family: Typhlopidae
- Genus: Afrotyphlops
- Species: A. nigrocandidus

Binomial name
- Afrotyphlops nigrocandidus (Broadley and Wallach, 2000)

Synonyms
- Rhinotyphlops nigrocandidus Broadley and Wallach, 2000

Species of reptile

The bicoloured blind snake (Afrotyphlops nigrocandidus) is a species of snake in the Typhlopidae family. The common name "bicoloured blind skink" has also been coined for it, although it is not a skink. It is endemic to east–central Tanzania.
