= Xenotyphlops =

Scientific classification
- Kingdom: Animalia
- Phylum: Chordata
- Class: Reptilia
- Order: Squamata
- Suborder: Serpentes
- Infraorder: Scolecophidia
- Superfamily: Typhlopoidea
- Family: Xenotyphlopidae; Vidal, Vences, Branch & Hedges, 2010
- Genus: Xenotyphlops; Wallach & Ineich, 1996

Species
- Two species, see text

Genus of snakes

Xenotyphlops is a genus of snakes, the only genus of the family Xenotyphlopidae, comprising two species found only in Madagascar. These snakes are also known as the Malagasy blind snake.

== Evolution ==
Xenotyphlops is an ancient group that diverged from other blind snakes during the Cretaceous, following the separation of Madagascar from India. On the newly-isolated Madagascar, the ancestral Xenotyphlopidae and Typhlopidae diverged from one another; Typhlopidae dispersed worldwide from Madagascar while leaving behind a single Malagasy genus (Madatyphlops), while the Xenotyphlopidae remained restricted to Madagascar. Xenotyphlops, Madatyphlops, and the Madagascan big-headed turtle are the only Malagasy terrestrial vertebrates whose isolation on Madagascar is due to Gondwanan vicariance.

== Physical characteristics ==
The family Xenotyphlopidae is composed of small blind snakes. These members lack cranial infrared receptors in pits or durface indentations. It is thought that these snakes used to have eyes but lost use of them over time. Members of the genus Xenotyphlops are distinguishable externally from the Typhlopidae by possessing a greatly enlarged and nearly circular rostral shield and a single enlarged anal shield. This shield is nearly vertical in a lateral aspect; as a result, the two species have a "bulldozer" appearance. Xenotyphlops get no larger than an earthworm and have translucent pink scales. Xenotyphlops species are internally unique in that they lack a tracheal lung and possess an unexpanded tracheal membrane. Like many other snake families they are assumed to be oviparous. Both species are completely terrestrial.

== Geographic range ==
Snakes of the genus Xenotyphlops are endemic to the island of Madagascar. Xenotyphlops burrow in the softer sandy soil of Madagascar's coastline forest and shrubland. For over 100 years the genus was known only from the type locality, which was "Madagascar", and only from the type specimens. These snakes presumably live in colonies of subterranean social insects.

== Conservation status ==
According to the IUCN Red List, X. grandidieri are considered to be critically endangered and X. mocquardi are data deficient. The two biggest threats to these species are Energy production (via mining/quarrying) and biological resource use (via logging and unintentional effects).

== Species ==
- Xenotyphlops grandidieri (Mocquard, 1905)
- Xenotyphlops mocquardi Wallach, Mercurio & Andreone, 2007

Nota bene: A binomial authority in parentheses indicates that the species was originally described in a genus other than Xenotyphlops.

== Etymology ==
The specific name, grandidieri, is in honor of French naturalist Alfred Grandidier.

The specific name, mocquardi, is in honor of French herpetologist François Mocquard.

== Taxonomy ==
In 2013, after examining several newly collected specimens, Wegener et al. concluded that X. mocquardi falls within the range of variation of X. grandidieri, and they proposed that X. mocquardi be considered a synonym of X. grandidieri. This change would make Xenotyphlops a monotypic genus in a monotypic family. The Xenotyphlipidae's sister taxon are the Typhlopidae.
