= Mocquard's worm snake =

Conservation status
- Least Concern (IUCN 3.1)

Scientific classification
- Kingdom: Animalia
- Phylum: Chordata
- Class: Reptilia
- Order: Squamata
- Suborder: Serpentes
- Family: Typhlopidae
- Genus: Madatyphlops
- Species: M. decorsei

Binomial name
- Madatyphlops decorsei (Mocquard, 1901)

Synonyms
- Typhlops decorsei Mocquard, 1901; Madatyphlops decorsei — Hedges et al., 2014

Species of snake

Mocquard's worm snake (Madatyphlops decorsei) is a species of snake in the family Typhlopidae. The species is native to Africa.

== Etymology ==
The specific name, decorsei, is in honor of French army doctor Gaston-Jules Decorse (1873-1907).

== Geographic range ==
M. decorsei is endemic to Madagascar.

== Habitat ==
The preferred natural habitat of M. decorsei is forest, at altitudes from sea level to 1,300 m (4,300 ft).

== Behavior ==
M. decorsei is mainly fossorial, but sometimes is active above ground.

== Reproduction ==
M. decorsei is oviparous.
