= Schmidt's blind snake =

Conservation status
- Data Deficient (IUCN 3.1)

Scientific classification
- Kingdom: Animalia
- Phylum: Chordata
- Class: Reptilia
- Order: Squamata
- Suborder: Serpentes
- Family: Typhlopidae
- Genus: Afrotyphlops
- Species: A. schmidti

Binomial name
- Afrotyphlops schmidti (Laurent, 1956)

Synonyms
- Typhlops schmidti Laurent, 1956; Rhinotyphlops schmidti — Wallach, 2003; Afrotyphlops schmidti — Hedges et al., 2014

Species of snake

Schmidt's blind snake (Afrotyphlops schmidti, formerly Typhlops schmidti) is a species of snake in the family Typhlopidae. The species is endemic to Central and Southern Africa.

== Etymology ==
The specific name, schmidti, is in honor of American herpetologist Karl Patterson Schmidt.

== Subspecies ==
Two subspecies are recognized:

- Afrotyphlops schmidti schmidti (Laurent, 1956)
- Afrotyphlops schmidti laurenti (Laurent, 1968)

== Geographic range ==
A. schmidti is found in Angola, Zambia, and eastern and southern Democratic Republic of the Congo (formerly known as Zaire).

== Reproduction ==
A. schmidti is oviparous.
