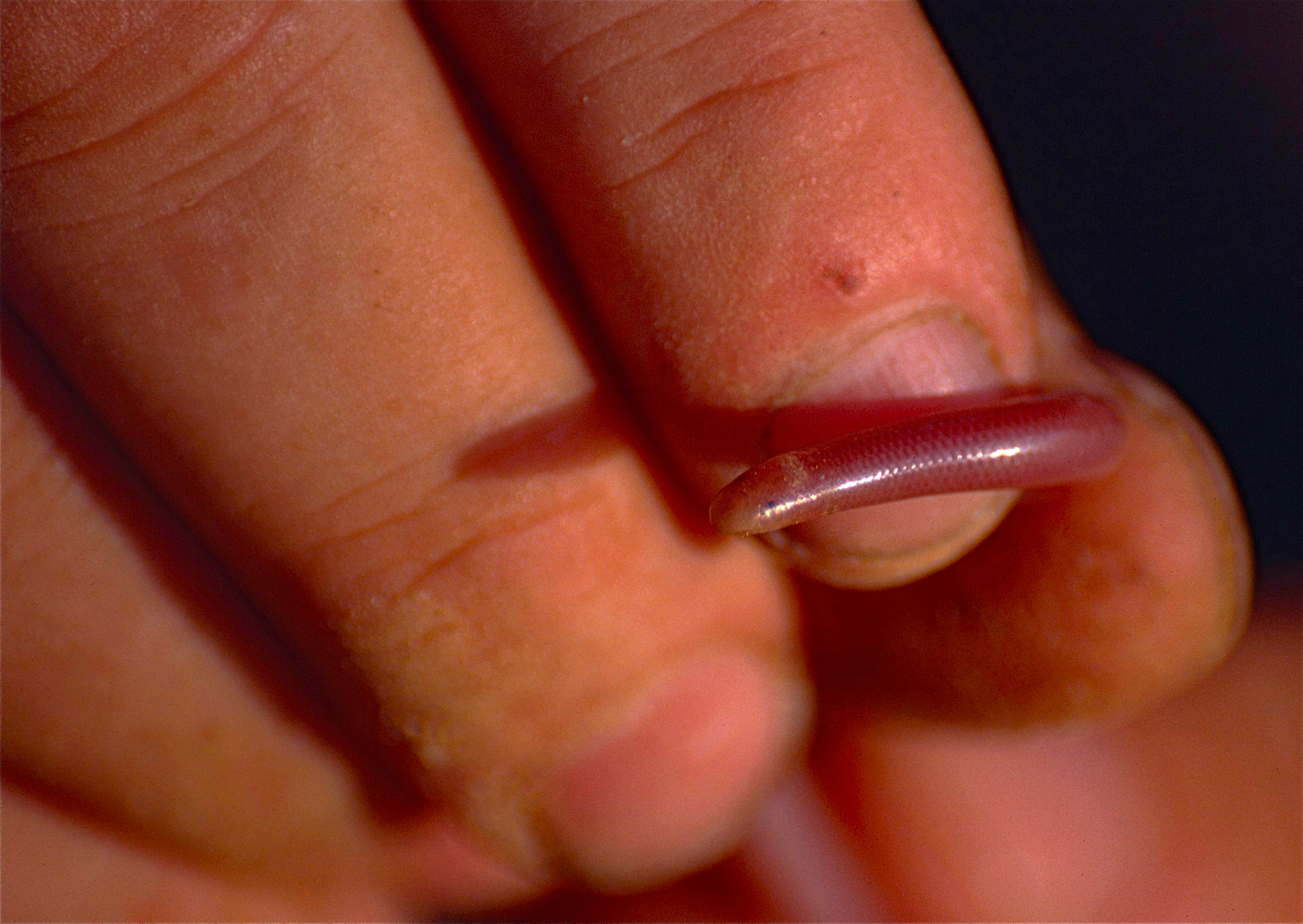

Conservation status
- Least Concern (IUCN 3.1)

Scientific classification
- Kingdom: Animalia
- Phylum: Chordata
- Class: Reptilia
- Order: Squamata
- Suborder: Serpentes
- Family: Typhlopidae
- Genus: Madatyphlops
- Species: M. arenarius

Binomial name
- Madatyphlops arenarius (Grandidier, 1872)

Synonyms
- Onychocephalus arenarius; Typhlops arenarius

= Sand worm snake =

Species of reptile

The sand worm snake (Madatyphlops arenarius) is a species of snake in the family Typhlopidae.
