= Kenyan dwarf blind snake =

Conservation status
- Data Deficient (IUCN 3.1)

Scientific classification
- Kingdom: Animalia
- Phylum: Chordata
- Class: Reptilia
- Order: Squamata
- Suborder: Serpentes
- Family: Typhlopidae
- Genus: Afrotyphlops
- Species: A. nanus

Binomial name
- Afrotyphlops nanus Broadley & Wallach, 2009

Species of reptile

The Kenyan dwarf blind snake (Afrotyphlops nanus) is a species of snake in the Typhlopidae family.
