= Angola blind snake =

Conservation status
- Least Concern (IUCN 3.1)

Scientific classification
- Kingdom: Animalia
- Phylum: Chordata
- Class: Reptilia
- Order: Squamata
- Suborder: Serpentes
- Family: Typhlopidae
- Genus: Afrotyphlops
- Species: A. angolensis

Binomial name
- Afrotyphlops angolensis (Bocage, 1866)

Synonyms
- Onychocephalus angolensis; Typhlops congicus; Typhlops adolfi; Typhlops dubius; Typhlops intermedius; Typhlops tornieri; Typhlops lestradei; Typhlops blanfordi lestradei; Typhlops ochraceus; Typhlops angolensis; Rhinotyplops angolensis

Species of snake

The Angola blind snake or Angolan blind snake (Afrotyphlops angolensis) is a species of snake in the Typhlopidae family. While named after its type locality in Angola, it is widespread in Central and East Africa. Specifically, it is found in Angola, northern Zambia, the Democratic Republic of the Congo, the Republic of the Congo, Gabon, Cameroon, the Central African Republic, Tanzania, Uganda, Kenya, Rwanda, and Burundi.

Afrotyphlops angolensis occurs in a variety of habitats, including Afromontane forest, lowland tropical moist forest, grassland mosaic, and bushland. It appears to prefer moister habitats.
