= Spotted blind snake =

Conservation status
- Least Concern (IUCN 3.1)

Scientific classification
- Kingdom: Animalia
- Phylum: Chordata
- Class: Reptilia
- Order: Squamata
- Suborder: Serpentes
- Family: Typhlopidae
- Genus: Afrotyphlops
- Species: A. punctatus

Binomial name
- Afrotyphlops punctatus (Leach, 1819)

Synonyms
- Acontias punctatus; Typhlops eschrichtii; Ophthalmidion eschrichtii; Onychophis punctata; Onychocephalus nigrolineatus; Onychocephalus liberiensis; Typhlops hallowelli; Typhlops kraussi; Typhlops liberiensis; Onychocephalus kraussi; Aspidorhynchus eschrichtii; Typhlops punctatus; Typhlops milleti; Typhlops leprosus; Rhinotyphlops punctatus

Species of snake

The spotted blind snake (Afrotyphlops punctatus) is a species of snake in the Typhlopidae family.
