= Rondo blind snake =

Conservation status
- Data Deficient (IUCN 3.1)

Scientific classification
- Kingdom: Animalia
- Phylum: Chordata
- Class: Reptilia
- Order: Squamata
- Suborder: Serpentes
- Family: Typhlopidae
- Genus: Afrotyphlops
- Species: A. rondoensis

Binomial name
- Afrotyphlops rondoensis Loveridge, 1942

Synonyms
- Typhlops tettensis rondoensis; Typhlops rondoensis

Species of snake

The Rondo worm snake (Afrotyphlops rondoensis) is a species of snake in the Typhlopidae family.
