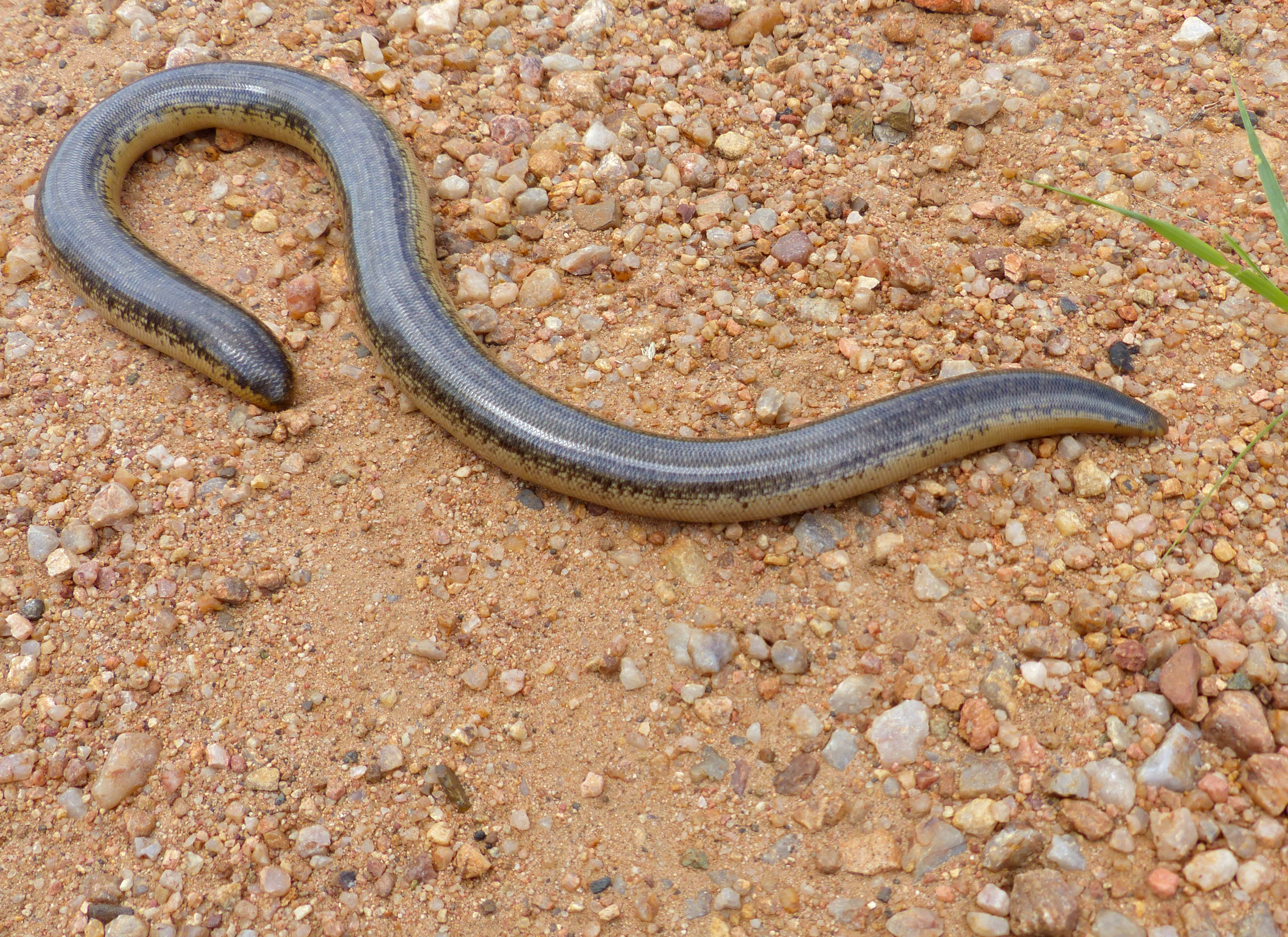
- Afrotyphlops schlegelii

Scientific classification
- Kingdom: Animalia
- Phylum: Chordata
- Class: Reptilia
- Order: Squamata
- Suborder: Serpentes
- Family: Typhlopidae
- Genus: Afrotyphlops; Broadley & Wallach, 2009

Synonyms
- Megatyphlops Broadley & Wallach, 2009

= Afrotyphlops =

Genus of snakes

Afrotyphlops is a genus of snakes in the family Typhlopidae.

== Distribution ==
The 28 species of this genus are found in sub-Saharan Africa.

== Species ==
The following species are recognized as being valid.

- Angola blind snake (Afrotyphlops angolensis Bocage, 1866)
- Angolan giant blind snake (Afrotyphlops anomalus Bocage, 1873)
- Bibron's blind snake (Afrotyphlops bibronii A. Smith, 1846)
- Blanford's blind snake (Afrotyphlops blanfordii Boulenger, 1889)
- Somali giant blind snake (Afrotyphlops brevis Scortecci, 1929)
- Calabresi's blind snake (Afrotyphlops calabresii Gans & Laurent, 1965)
- Chirio's blind snake (Afrotyphlops chirioi Trape, 2019)
- Blotched blind snake (Afrotyphlops congestus A.M.C. Duméril & Bibron, 1844)
- Wedge-snouted blind snake (Afrotyphlops cuneirostris W. Peters, 1879)
- Elegant blind snake (Afrotyphlops elegans W. Peters, 1868)
- Fornasini's blind snake (Afrotyphlops fornasinii Bianconi, 1847)
- Gierra's blind snake (Afrotyphlops gierrai Mocquard, 1897)
- Kaimosi blind snake (Afrotyphlops kaimosae Loveridge, 1935)
- Liberian blind snake (Afrotyphlops liberiensis Hallowell, 1848)
- Lined blind snake (Afrotyphlops lineolatus Jan, 1864)
- African giant blind snake (Afrotyphlops mucruso W. Peters, 1854)
- Kenyan dwarf blind snake (Afrotyphlops nanus Broadley & Wallach, 2009)
- Bicoloured blind snake (Afrotyphlops nigrocandidus Broadley & Wallach, 2000)
- Malawi blind snake (Afrotyphlops obtusus W. Peters, 1865)
- Tanga blind snake (Afrotyphlops platyrhynchus Sternfeld, 1910)
- Spotted blind snake (Afrotyphlops punctatus Leach, 1819)
- Rondo blind snake (Afrotyphlops rondoensis Loveridge, 1942)
- Afrotyphlops rouxestevae Trape, 2019
- Schlegel's giant blind snake (Afrotyphlops schlegelii Bianconi, 1847)
- Schmidt's blind snake (Afrotyphlops schmidti Laurent, 1956)
- Steinhaus's blind snake (Afrotyphlops steinhausi F. Werner, 1909)
- Liwale blind snake (Afrotyphlops tanganicanus Laurent, 1964)
- Usambara blotched blind snake (Afrotyphlops usambaricus Laurent, 1964)

Nota bene: A binomial authority in parentheses indicates that the species was originally described in a genus other than Afrotyphlops.
