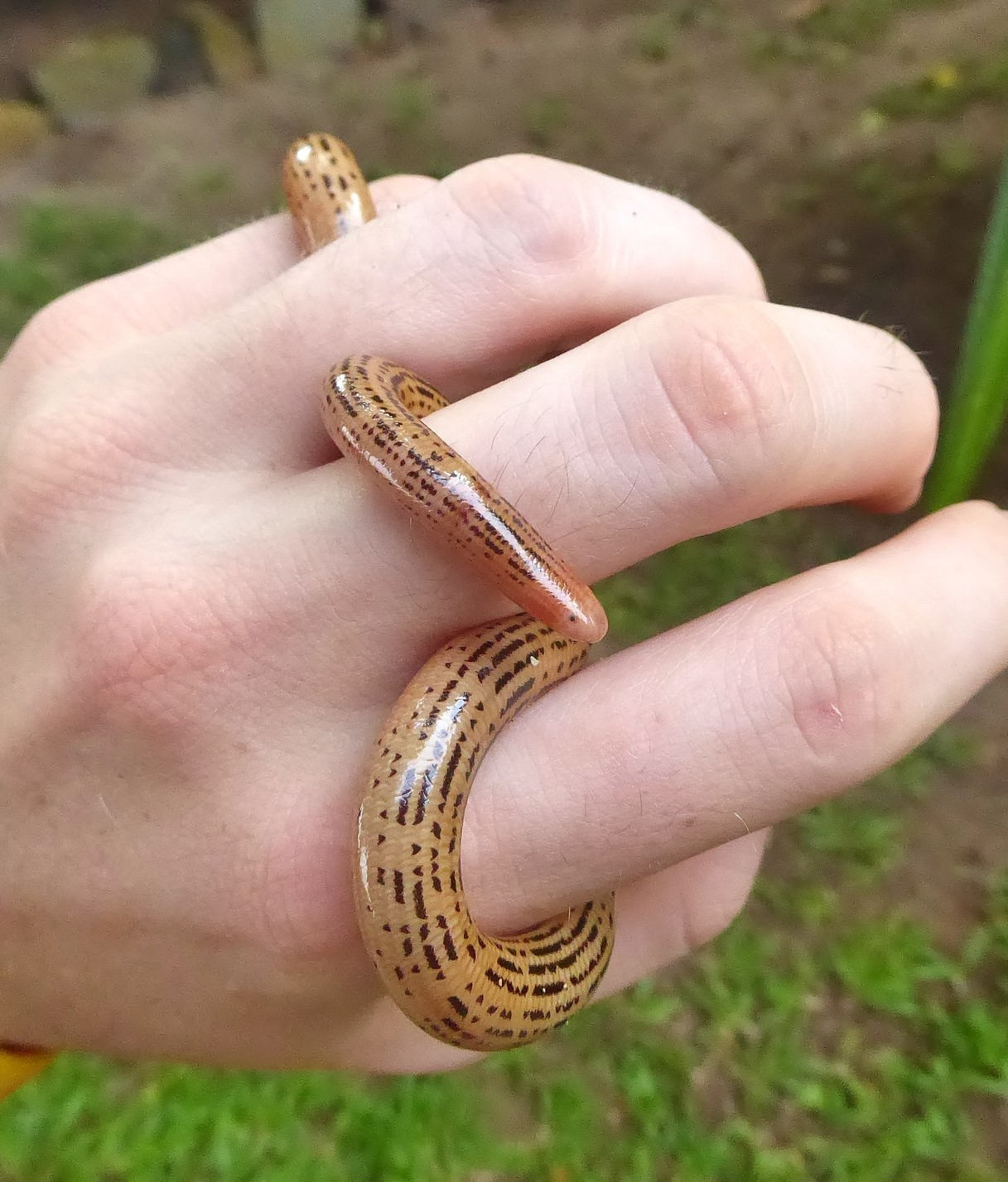

Conservation status
- Least Concern (IUCN 3.1)

Scientific classification
- Kingdom: Animalia
- Phylum: Chordata
- Class: Reptilia
- Order: Squamata
- Suborder: Serpentes
- Family: Typhlopidae
- Genus: Afrotyphlops
- Species: A. elegans

Binomial name
- Afrotyphlops elegans (Peters, 1868)

Synonyms
- Typhlops elegans Peters, 1868

= Elegant blind snake =

Species of snake

The elegant blind snake (Afrotyphlops elegans), also called the elegant worm snake, is a species of snake in the Typhlopidae family. It was described by Wilhelm Peters in 1868. The species occurs on the island of Príncipe in São Tomé and Príncipe.
