= Liberian blind snake =

Conservation status
- Least Concern (IUCN 3.1)

Scientific classification
- Kingdom: Animalia
- Phylum: Chordata
- Class: Reptilia
- Order: Squamata
- Suborder: Serpentes
- Family: Typhlopidae
- Genus: Afrotyphlops
- Species: A. liberiensis

Binomial name
- Afrotyphlops liberiensis Hallowell, 1848

Synonyms
- Typhlops liberiensis; Afrotyphlops liberiensis; Onychocephalus liberiensis; Typhlops punctatus liberiensis; Typhlops schlegelii liberiensis; Rhinotyphlops schlegelii liberiensis

Species of reptile

The Liberian blind snake (Afrotyphlops liberiensis) is a species of snake in the family Typhlopidae.
