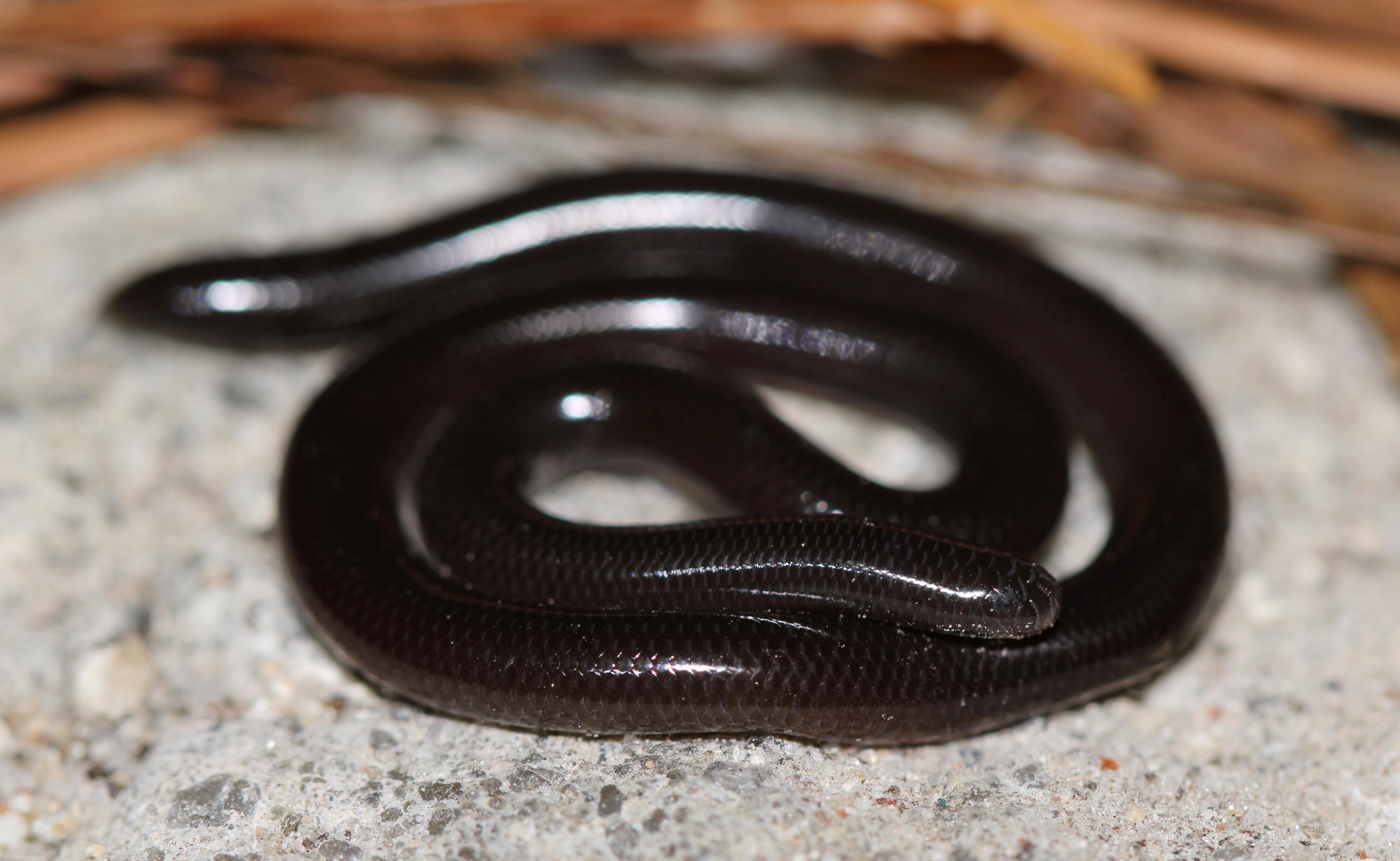
- Brahminy blind snake (Indotyphlops braminus)

Conservation status
- Least Concern (IUCN 3.1)

Scientific classification
- Kingdom: Animalia
- Phylum: Chordata
- Class: Reptilia
- Order: Squamata
- Suborder: Serpentes
- Family: Typhlopidae
- Genus: Indotyphlops
- Species: I. braminus

Binomial name
- Indotyphlops braminus (Daudin, 1803)

Synonyms
- Eryx braminus Daudin, 1803; [Tortrix] Russelii Merrem, 1820; Typhlops braminus — Cuvier, 1829; Typhlops Russeli — Schlegel, 1839; Argyrophis truncatus Gray, 1845; Argyrophis Bramicus Gray, 1845; Eryx Bramicus — Gray, 1845; Tortrix Bramicus — Gray, 1845; Onychocephalus Capensis A. Smith, 1846; Ophthalmidium tenue Hallowell, 1861; T[yphlops]. (Typhlops) inconspicuus Jan, 1863; T[yphlops]. (Typhlops) accedens Jan, 1863; T[yphlops]. accedens — Jan & Sordelli, 1864; Typhlops (Typhlops) euproctus Boettger, 1882; Typhlops bramineus A.B. Meyer, 1887; Tortrix russellii — Boulenger, 1893; Typhlops russellii — Boulenger, 1893; Typhlops braminus — Boulenger, 1893; Typhlops accedens — Boulenger, 1893; Typhlops limbrickii Annandale, 1906; Typhlops braminus var. arenicola Annandale, 1906; [Typhlops braminus] var. pallidus Wall, 1909; Typhlops microcephalus F. Werner, 1909; Glauconia braueri Sternfeld, 1910; [Typhlops] braueri — Boulenger, 1910; Typhlopidae braminus — Roux, 1911; Typhlops fletcheri Wall, 1919; Typhlops braminus braminus — Mertens, 1930; Typhlops braminus — Nakamura, 1938; Typhlops pseudosaurus Dryden & Taylor, 1969; Typhlina (?) bramina — McDowell, 1974; Ramphotyphlops braminus — Nussbaum, 1980; Indotyphlops braminus — Hedges et al., 2014

= Indotyphlops braminus =

Species of snake

Indotyphlops braminus, commonly known as the brahminy blind snake (/ˈbrɑːməni/), is a non-venomous blind snake species, found mostly in Africa and Asia, and has been introduced in many other parts of the world. It is a completely fossorial (i.e., burrowing) reptile, with habits and appearance similar to an earthworm, for which it is often mistaken and shares convergent evolution with, although close examination reveals tiny scales and eyes rather than the annular segments characteristic of a true earthworm. The species is parthenogenetic and all known specimens have been female. The specific name is a Latinized form of the word Brahmin. No subspecies are currently recognized as being valid.

== Description ==
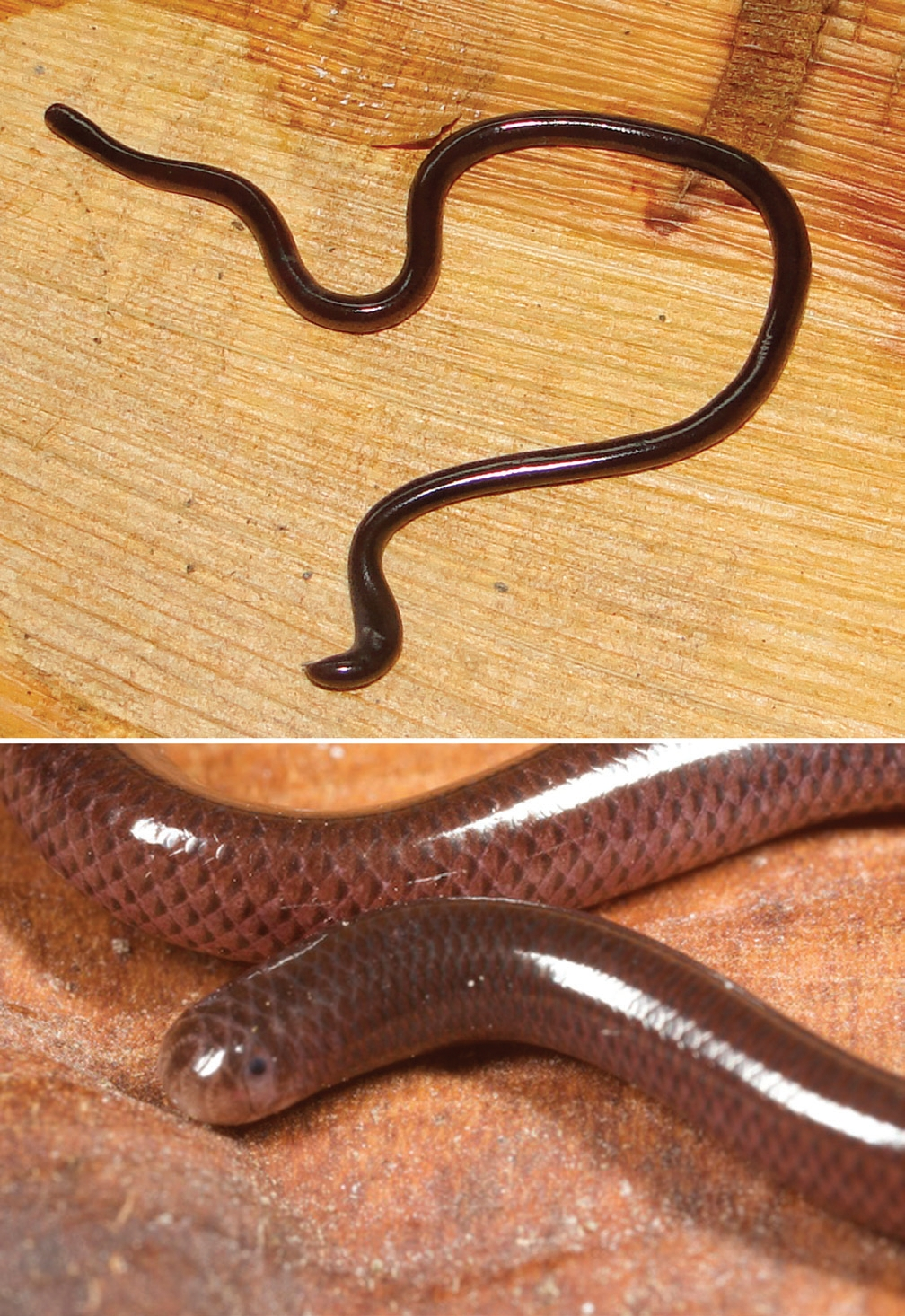
I. braminus in Hua Hin, Thailand (top) and East Timor (bottom)

Adults of I. braminus measure 2–4 inches (5.1–10.2 cm) long, uncommonly to 6 inches (15 cm). The head and tail are superficially similar as the head and neck are indistinct. Unlike other snakes, the head scales resemble the body scales. The eyes are barely discernible as small dots under the head scales. The tip of the tail has a small, pointed spur. Along the body are fourteen rows of dorsal scales. Coloration ranges from charcoal gray, silver-gray, light yellow-beige, purplish, or infrequently albino, the ventral surface more pale. Coloration of the juvenile form is similar to that of the adult. Behavior ranges from lethargic in appropriate habitat to energetic, quickly seeking the cover of soil or leaf litter to avoid light.

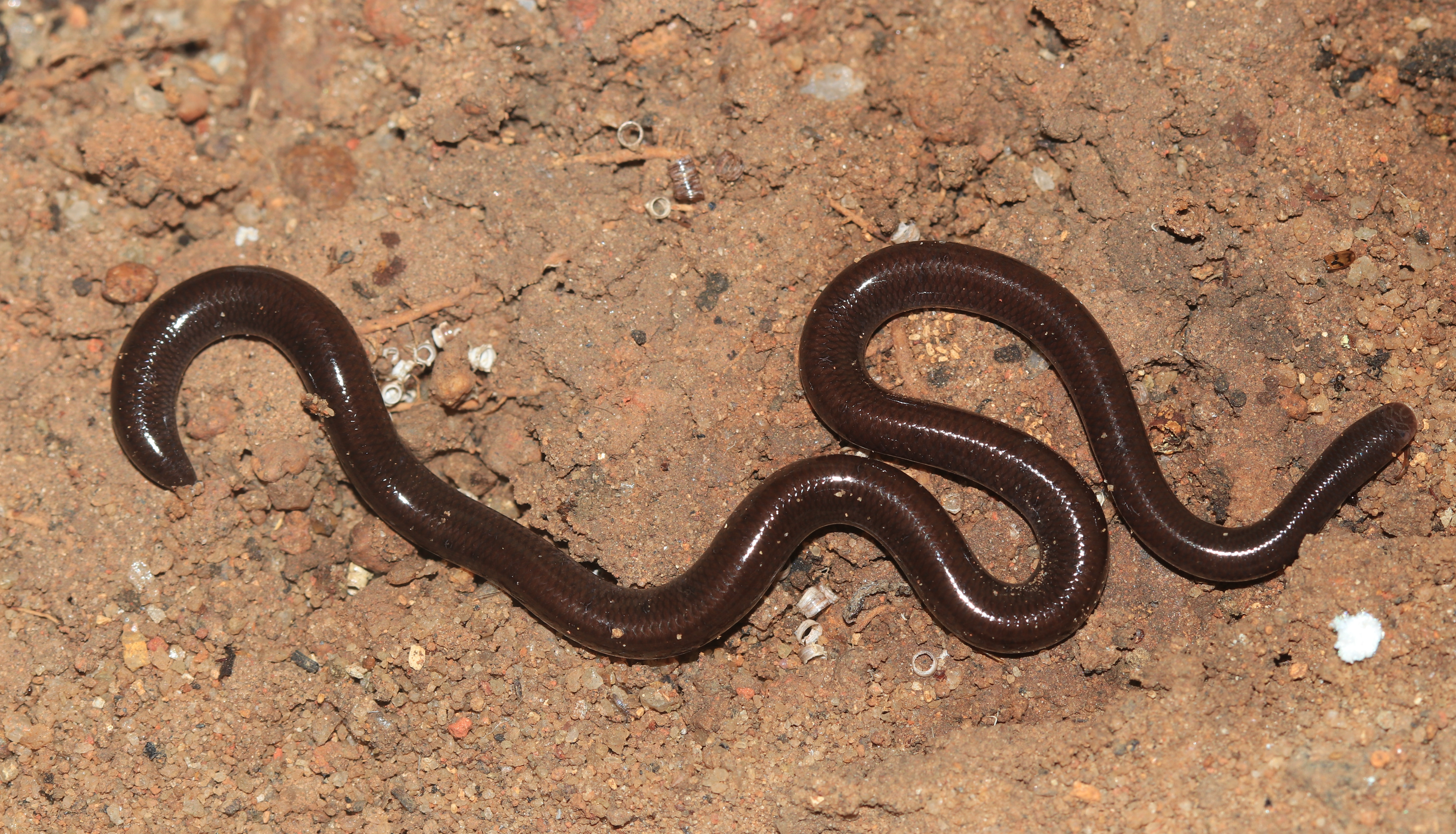
Indotyphlops braminus from Kerala, India

The tiny eyes are covered with translucent scales, rendering this snake almost entirely blind. The eyes cannot form images, but are still capable of registering light intensity.

== Common names ==
I. braminus is variously known as the brahminy blind snake, flowerpot snake, common blind snake, island blind snake, teliya snake, and Hawaiian blind snake. The moniker "flowerpot snake" derives from the snake's incidental introduction to various parts of the world through the plant trade. "Kurudi" is the common Malayalam term which refers to I. braminus. "Sirupaambu" is the common Tamil term which refers to I. braminus.

It may also be known as the iron wire snake.

== Distribution ==
Most likely originally native to Africa and Asia, I. braminus is an introduced species in many parts of the world, including Australia, the Americas, and Oceania.

The vertical distribution is from sea level to 1,200 metres (3,900 ft) in Sri Lanka and up to 1,500 metres (4,900 ft) in Guatemala. The type locality given is "Vishakhapatam" [India].

=== Native range ===
In Africa, I. braminus has been reported in Uganda, DRC, Egypt, Kenya, Senegal, Benin, Togo, Nigeria, Ivory Coast, Cameroon, Zambia, Zimbabwe, Somalia, Zanzibar, Tanzania, Mozambique, South Africa (an isolated colony in Cape Town and Natal Midlands; about eight have been found in Lephalale, Limpopo Province at the Medupi Power Station during construction), Madagascar (Nossi Be), the Comoro Islands, Mauritius, the Mascarene Islands and the Seychelles. It has also been found in Libya.

In Asia, it occurs in the Arabian Peninsula, Lebanon, Iran, Iraq, Philippines, Pakistan, Nepal, mainland India (as well as the Andaman Islands, the Nicobar Islands, and the Lakshadweep Islands, where it is the only snake reported), the Maldives, Sri Lanka, Bangladesh, Myanmar, Singapore, the Malay Peninsula, Thailand, Cambodia, Vietnam, Laos, southern China (including Hainan), Hong Kong, Taiwan, and Japan (in the Ryukyu Islands of Okinawashima and Miyakoshima).

In Maritime Southeast Asia, it occurs on Sumatra and nearby islands (the Riau Archipelago, Bangka, Belitung and Nias), Borneo, Sulawesi, the Philippines, Java, Bali, Flores, East Timor, the Kai Islands, the Aru Islands, New Guinea (Western Papua and Papua New Guinea), New Britain, and Bougainville Island.

It also occurs in the Cocos (Keeling) Islands, and on Christmas Island.

=== Introduced range ===
In Australia, I. braminus occurs in the Northern Territory near Darwin, and in parts of Queensland.

In Oceania, it occurs on Papua New Guinea, Palau, Guam, Fiji, Saipan, the Hawaiian Islands and Tahiti in French Polynesia.

In the Americas, it occurs in the United States (California, Connecticut, Florida, Georgia, Louisiana, Massachusetts, Arizona, Hawaii and Texas), western and southern Mexico, Guatemala, Belize, Colombia, Barbados and on the Cayman Islands, as well as the Turks and Caicos Islands. It has also been spotted in the Okanagan in B.C., Canada.

In Europe, it has been found in Spain (in the Canary Islands of Tenerife and Gran Canaria), in Italy (on the island of Ischia), and in Malta; it is believed to have been introduced in soil imported with potted plants, and has been labeled potentially invasive to native fauna.

== Habitat ==
Usually, the brahminy blind snake occurs in urban and agricultural areas. This species of snake lives underground in ant and termite nests. It is also found under logs, moist leaves, stones and humus in wet forest, dry jungle, abandoned buildings, and even city gardens. The distribution and survival of this group of blind snakes directly reflect soil humidity and temperature.

== Feeding ==
The diet of I. braminus consists of the larvae, eggs, and pupae of ants and termites.

== Reproduction ==
I. braminus is parthenogenetic, and all specimens collected so far have been female. It lays eggs or may bear live young. Up to eight offspring are produced, all female and genetically identical. They are triploid, and it has been proposed that the species be transferred to a new genus as Virgotyphlops braminus because of its obligate parthenogenetic nature.

== See also ==
- Smallest organisms
