= Lined blind snake =

Conservation status
- Least Concern (IUCN 3.1)

Scientific classification
- Kingdom: Animalia
- Phylum: Chordata
- Class: Reptilia
- Order: Squamata
- Suborder: Serpentes
- Family: Typhlopidae
- Genus: Afrotyphlops
- Species: A. lineolatus

Binomial name
- Afrotyphlops lineolatus (Jan, 1864)

Synonyms
- Typhlops (Ophthalmidion) lineolatus Jan, 1864; Rhinotyphlops lineolatus — Chirio & Ineich, 2006; Afrotyphlops lineolatus — Broadley & Wallach, 2009

Species of snake

The lined blind snake (Afrotyphlops lineolatus), also known as the common lined blind snake, common lined worm snake, or lineolate blind snake, is a species of snake in the family Typhlopidae. It is widely distributed in Sub-Saharan Africa, from Senegal in the west to Ethiopia in the east and Angola and Zambia in the south. It mainly eats ants and termites.
