= Ferdinando Sordelli =

Italian botanist (1837–1916)

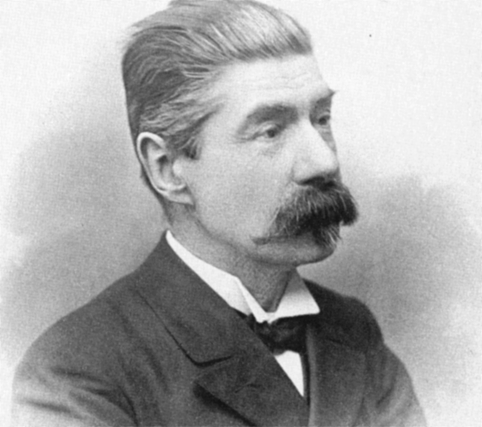
- Ferdinando Sordelli
- Born: December 12, 1837; Milan, Italy
- Died: January 17, 1916 (aged 78); Milan, Italy
- Scientific career
- Fields: Illustration, Natural history
- Author abbrev. (botany): Sordelli

Ferdinando Sordelli (December 12, 1837 – January 17, 1916) was an Italian artist, illustrator, and naturalist.

He began working with Giorgio Jan (1791–1866) in 1857 at the Civic Museum of Natural History of Milan, first as a temporary assistant and, from 1865, as a permanent one. Jan, his aging professor, encouraged him to undertake the Iconographie Générale des Ophidiens, a work comprising 50 parts, each with six plates, all executed by Sordelli.

After Jan’s death in 1866, Sordelli ensured the completion of the publication. The collection, consisting of about 8,500 drawings, is one of the most extensive ever produced on a group of animals.

In addition to his contributions to Jan’s work, Sordelli carried out his own research in zoology and paleontology, particularly on fossil flora.
