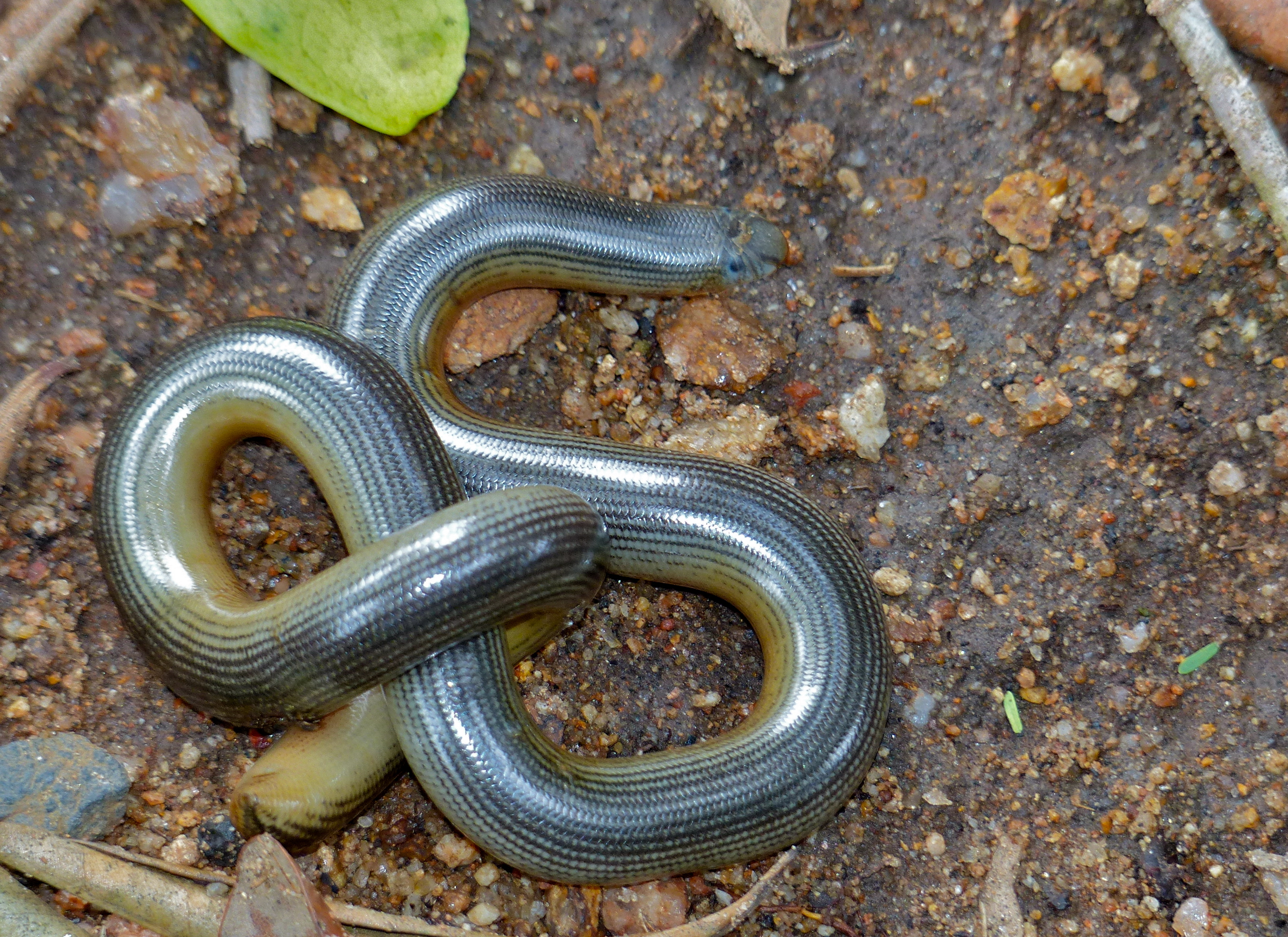

Conservation status
- Least Concern (IUCN 3.1)

Scientific classification
- Kingdom: Animalia
- Phylum: Chordata
- Class: Reptilia
- Order: Squamata
- Suborder: Serpentes
- Family: Typhlopidae
- Genus: Afrotyphlops
- Species: A. mucruso

Binomial name
- Afrotyphlops mucruso W. Peters, 1854

Synonyms
- Typhlops mucruso; Afrotyphlops mucruso; Rhinotyphlops mucruso; Megatyphlops mucruso; Typhlops schlegelii mucruso; Rhinotyphlops schlegelii mucruso; Onychocephalus mucruso; Onychocephalus dinga; Onychocephalus varius

= African giant blind snake =

Species of reptile

The African giant blind snake (Afrotyphlops mucruso), also called the Zambezi beaked blind snake, is a species of snake in the Typhlopidae family.
