= Van Wallach =

American herpetologist

Van Stanley Bartholomew Wallach
- Born: 1947 (age 78–79)
- Known for: Taxonomy of Scolecophidia (Blindsnakes); Lead editor of Snakes of the World (2014); Snake internal anatomy and systematics
- Scientific career
- Fields: Herpetology, Taxonomy, Internal anatomy
- Institutions: Museum of Comparative Zoology, Harvard University
- Author abbrev. (zoology): Wallach

Van Stanley Bartholomew Wallach (born 1947) is an American herpetologist and an expert on blindsnakes and on the systematics, internal anatomy, and taxonomy of snakes. He has contributed to the descriptions of at least 46 species of snakes and has conducted fieldwork on tropical snakes in the Philippines, Nicaragua, and the Democratic Republic of the Congo.

For many years Wallach worked as a Curatorial Assistant at the Museum of Comparative Zoology at Harvard University in Cambridge, Massachusetts. He retired from the museum in 2012, but he continues to work on snake taxonomy. Wallach was the lead editor of the 1,227 page authoritative reference book Snakes of the World.

== Wallach-Hoser dispute about taxonomic vandalism ==
In the 2000s Wallach was one of several herpetologists who became embroiled in a dispute with Raymond Hoser, an Australian herpetologist, over proper nomenclatural acts. Hoser charged Wallach with creating a destabilising dual nomenclature by attempting to rename species that Hoser had already described in his journal. Wallach's coauthors suggested incorrectly that Hoser had not complied with the provisions of the ICZN Code. The debate became quite heated, with Hoser charging Wallach with "scientific fraud", whereas nine prominent biologists published a paper in which they, not so indirectly, called Hoser a "taxonomic vandal".

== Taxon named in his honor ==
- Boiga wallachi Das, 1998
- Gerrhopilus wallachi Kraus 2023

== Taxa credited ==
- Acutotyphlops banaorum Wallach, Brown, Diesmos & Gee, 2007
- Acutotyphlops kunuaensis Wallach, 1995
- Afrotyphlops nanus Broadley & Wallach, 2009
- Afrotyphlops nigrocandidus Broadley & Wallach, 2000
- Epacrophis drewesi Wallach, 1996
- Epictia alfredschmidti Lehr, Wallach, Köhler & Aguilar, 2002
- Guinea broadleyi Wallach & Hahn, 1997
- Guinea greenwelli Wallach & Boundy, 2005
- Leptotyphlops aethiopicus Broadley & Wallach, 2007
- Leptotyphlops howelli Broadley & Wallach, 2007
- Leptotyphlops keniensis Broadley & Wallach, 2007
- Leptotyphlops macrops Broadley & Wallach, 1996
- Leptotyphlops mbanjensis Broadley & Wallach, 2007
- Leptotyphlops nigroterminus Broadley & Wallach, 2007
- Leptotyphlops pungwensis Broadley & Wallach, 1997
- Leptotyphlops sylvicolus Broadley & Wallach, 1997
- Letheobia jubana Broadley & Wallach, 2007
- Letheobia largeni Broadley & Wallach, 2007
- Letheobia pauwelsi Wallach, 2005
- Letheobia pembana Broadley & Wallach, 2007
- Letheobia swahilica Broadley & Wallach, 2007
- Letheobia toritensis Broadley & Wallach, 2007
- Myriopholis adleri Hahn & Wallach, 1998
- Myriopholis ionidesi Broadley & Wallach, 2007
- Myriopholis tanae Broadley & Wallach, 2007
- Oligodon jintakunei Pauwels, Wallach, David, Chanhome, 2002
- Ramphotyphlops marxi Wallach, 1993
- Rhinotyphlops episcopus Franzen & Wallach, 2002
- Typhlops andasibensis Wallach & Glaw, 2009
- Typhlops etheridgei Wallach, 2002
- Typhlops fredparkeri Wallach, 1996
- Typhlops lazelli Wallach & Pauwels, 2004
- Typhlops mcdowelli Wallach, 1996
- Typhlops meszoelyi Wallach, 1999
- Typhlops roxaneae Wallach, 2001
- Xenotyphlops mocquardi Wallach, Mercurio & Andreone, 2007
- Xyelodontophis uluguruensis Broadley & Wallach, 2002
