= Lowland beaked blind snake =

Conservation status
- Least Concern (IUCN 3.1)

Scientific classification
- Kingdom: Animalia
- Phylum: Chordata
- Class: Reptilia
- Order: Squamata
- Suborder: Serpentes
- Family: Gerrhopilidae
- Genus: Gerrhopilus
- Species: G. depressiceps

Binomial name
- Gerrhopilus depressiceps (Sternfeld, 1913)

Synonyms
- Typhlops depressiceps; Typhlops monochrus; Typhlops monochrous

Species of snake

The lowland beaked blind snake (Gerrhopilus depressiceps) is a species of snake in the Gerrhopilidae family.
