= Black blind snake =

Species named black blind snake include:

- Epictia goudotii, a species of snake native to Middle America
- Gerrhopilus ater, a species of snake native to Asia
