= Manila worm snake =

Scientific classification
- Kingdom: Animalia
- Phylum: Chordata
- Class: Reptilia
- Order: Squamata
- Suborder: Serpentes
- Family: Gerrhopilidae
- Genus: Gerrhopilus
- Species: G. manilae

Binomial name
- Gerrhopilus manilae (Taylor, 1919)

Synonyms
- Typhlops manilae; Malayotyphlops manilae

Species of snake

The Manila worm snake (Gerrhopilus manilae) is a species of snake in the Gerrhopilidae family. It is sometimes placed in the genus Malayotyphlops.
