= Gerrhopilus thurstoni =

Conservation status
- Data Deficient (IUCN 3.1)

Scientific classification
- Kingdom: Animalia
- Phylum: Chordata
- Class: Reptilia
- Order: Squamata
- Suborder: Serpentes
- Family: Gerrhopilidae
- Genus: Gerrhopilus
- Species: G. thurstoni

Binomial name
- Gerrhopilus thurstoni (Boettger, 1890)

Synonyms
- Typhlops thurstoni Boettger, 1890; Typhlops thurstonii [sic] — Boulenger, 1893; Typhlops walli Procter, 1924; Typhlops hurstonii [sic] Bourret, 1936 (ex errore); Gerrhopilus thurstoni — Hedges et al., 2014

Species of reptile

Gerrhopilus thurstoni, or Thurston's worm snake, is a species of harmless blind snake in the family Gerrhopilidae. The species is native to western India. No recognized subspecies exist.

== Etymology ==
The specific name, thurstoni, is in honor of British zoologist Edgar Thurston.

== Geographic range ==
In western India, G. thurstoni has been found in southern Goa, from sea level to approximately 1,200 m elevation (4,000 feet), and in Kerala.

The type locality given is "Nilgiri Hills, Brit. Ostindien ".

== Habitat ==
The preferred natural habitat of G. thurstoni is forest.

== Description ==
G. thurstoni may attain a total length (including tail) of 30 cm (12 in). The body is light brown or yellowish dorsally, and paler ventrally. The snout and the anal region are whitish.

== Reproduction ==
G. thurstoni is oviparous.
