= McDowell's blind snake =

Conservation status
- Data Deficient (IUCN 3.1)

Scientific classification
- Kingdom: Animalia
- Phylum: Chordata
- Class: Reptilia
- Order: Squamata
- Suborder: Serpentes
- Family: Gerrhopilidae
- Genus: Gerrhopilus
- Species: G. mcdowelli

Binomial name
- Gerrhopilus mcdowelli (Wallach, 1996)

Synonyms
- Typhlops mcdowelli Wallach, 1996; Gerrhopilus mcdowelli — Vidal et al., 2010

Species of snake

McDowell's blind snake (Gerrhopilus mcdowelli) is a species of snake in the family Gerrhopilidae.

== Etymology ==
The specific name, mcdowelli, is in honor of American herpetologist Samuel Booker McDowell Jr.

== Geographic range ==
Gerrhopilus mcdowelli is endemic to Papua New Guinea.

== Habitat ==
The preferred natural habitat of Gerrhopilus mcdowelli is forest, at altitudes of 50–600 m (160–1,970 ft).

== Behavior ==
Gerrhopilus mcdowelli is terrestrial and fossorial.

== Diet ==
Gerrhopilus mcdowelli preys upon larvae and adults of ants and termites.

== Reproduction ==
Gerrhopilus mcdowelli is oviparous.
