= Andaman worm snake =

Conservation status
- Data Deficient (IUCN 3.1)

Scientific classification
- Kingdom: Animalia
- Phylum: Chordata
- Class: Reptilia
- Order: Squamata
- Suborder: Serpentes
- Family: Gerrhopilidae
- Genus: Gerrhopilus
- Species: G. andamanensis

Binomial name
- Gerrhopilus andamanensis (Stoliczka, 1871)

Synonyms
- Typhlops Andamanensis Stoliczka, 1871; Typhlops andamanensis — Boulenger, 1893; Gerrhopilus andamanensis — Vidal et al., 2010

Species of snake

The Andaman worm snake (Gerrhopilus andamanensis) is a species of blind snake in the family Gerrhopilidae. The species is endemic to the Andaman Islands.

== Taxonomy ==
The species was first described in 1871 by Ferdinand Stoliczka, who placed it in the genus Typhlops. The type locality was simply given as the Andaman Islands.

The species was moved to the genus Gerrhopilus in 2010 by Vidal et al., following a study of the evolutionary tree of the worm snakes.

== Geographic range ==
It is found in the Andaman Islands in the Bay of Bengal.
