= Gerrhopilus bisubocularis =

Conservation status
- Data Deficient (IUCN 3.1)

Scientific classification
- Kingdom: Animalia
- Phylum: Chordata
- Class: Reptilia
- Order: Squamata
- Suborder: Serpentes
- Family: Gerrhopilidae
- Genus: Gerrhopilus
- Species: G. bisubocularis

Binomial name
- Gerrhopilus bisubocularis (Boettger, 1893)

Synonyms
- Typhlops bisubocularis

Species of snake

Gerrhopilus bisubocularis, also known as the Javanese blind snake or Western Java worm snake, is a species of snake in the Gerrhopilidae family.
