= Gerrhopilus oligolepis =

Conservation status
- Data Deficient (IUCN 3.1)

Scientific classification
- Kingdom: Animalia
- Phylum: Chordata
- Class: Reptilia
- Order: Squamata
- Suborder: Serpentes
- Family: Gerrhopilidae
- Genus: Gerrhopilus
- Species: G. oligolepis

Binomial name
- Gerrhopilus oligolepis (Wall, 1909)

Synonyms
- Typhlops oligolepis Wall, 1909

Species of snake

Gerrhopilus oligolepis, also known as the few-scaled worm snake or Wall's worm snake, is a harmless blind snake species found in northern India and Nepal. No subspecies are currently recognized.

== Geographic range ==
Found in the eastern Himalayas in India in the area of Sikkim and Darjeeling and in Nepal. The type locality given is "Nagri Valley below Darjeeling [India] at an altitude of about 5000 feet."
