= Viserion =

Viserion may refer to:

- Viserion (Game of Thrones), one of the three dragons hatched by Daenerys Targaryen in the Game of Thrones franchise
- Viserion, one of the three dragons hatched by Daenerys Targaryen in the A Song of Ice and Fire books by George R. R. Martin
- Pseudocalotes viserion, Viserion’s false garden lizard, a species of agamid lizard, found in Malaysia
- Cryodrakon viserion, a name originally considered by Michael Habib for Cryodrakon boreas
