= Beddome's worm snake =

Conservation status
- Data Deficient (IUCN 3.1)

Scientific classification
- Kingdom: Animalia
- Phylum: Chordata
- Class: Reptilia
- Order: Squamata
- Suborder: Serpentes
- Family: Gerrhopilidae
- Genus: Gerrhopilus
- Species: G. beddomii

Binomial name
- Gerrhopilus beddomii (Boulenger, 1890)

Synonyms
- Typhlops beddomii Boulenger, 1890; Typhlops beddomii — Boulenger, 1893; Typhlops beddomei — Wall, 1923; Typhlops beddomei — M.A. Smith, 1943; Typhlops beddomii — McDiarmid, Campbell & Touré, 1999; Gerrhopilus beddomii — Vidal et al., 2010

Species of snake

Beddome's worm snake (Gerrhopilus beddomii) is a species of harmless blind snake in the family Gerrhopilidae. The species is native to southern India. No subspecies are currently recognized.

== Etymology ==
G. beddomii is named after Richard Henry Beddome (1830-1911), a British army officer and botanist.

== Geographic range ==
Beddome's worm snake is found in southern India in the Western Ghats and in the Kimedy Hills near Visakhapatnam in eastern India.

The type locality given is "Hills of the Indian Peninsula ... Kimedy Hills, (Visakhapatnam district) and in the Anaimalai and Travancore Hills between 2000 and 5000 feet" (about 600–1500 m).

== Habitat ==
The preferred natural habitat of G. beddomii is forest, at altitudes of 600–950 m (1,970–3,120 ft).

== Description ==
G. beddomii may attain a total length (including tail) of 14 cm (5.5 in). Dorsally, it is brown, often with a darker vertebral line. Ventrally, it is paler brown. The rounded snout and the anal region are whitish.

== Reproduction ==
G. beddomii is oviparous.
