= Gerrhopilus hedraeus =

Conservation status
- Least Concern (IUCN 3.1)

Scientific classification
- Kingdom: Animalia
- Phylum: Chordata
- Class: Reptilia
- Order: Squamata
- Suborder: Serpentes
- Family: Gerrhopilidae
- Genus: Gerrhopilus
- Species: G. hedraeus

Binomial name
- Gerrhopilus hedraeus (Savage, 1950)

Synonyms
- Typhlops hedraea Savage, 1950; Typhlops hedraeus — McDiarmid et al., 1999; Gerrhopilus carolinehoserae Hoser, 2012

Species of snake

Gerrhopilus hedraeus, also known as the Negros Island blind snake or Negros Island worm snake, is a species of snake in the family Gerrhopilidae. It is endemic to the Philippines.
