= Gerrhopilus tindalli =

Conservation status
- Data Deficient (IUCN 3.1)

Scientific classification
- Kingdom: Animalia
- Phylum: Chordata
- Class: Reptilia
- Order: Squamata
- Suborder: Serpentes
- Family: Gerrhopilidae
- Genus: Gerrhopilus
- Species: G. tindalli

Binomial name
- Gerrhopilus tindalli (M.A. Smith, 1943)

Synonyms
- Typhlops tindalli M.A. Smith, 1943; Gerrhopilus tindalli — Vidal et al., 2010

Species of snake

Gerrhopilus tindalli, commonly named the Nilgiri Hills worm snake or Tindall's worm snake, is a species of harmless blind snake in the family Gerrhopilidae, native to southern India.

== Etymology ==
The specific name, tindalli, is in honor of Roger Tindall.

== Geographic range ==
G. tindalli is found in India in the Nilgiri Hills, Malabar District. The type locality given is "Nilambur, Malabar district" [India].

== Habitat ==
The preferred natural habitat of G. tindalli is forest.

== Reproduction ==
G. tindalli is oviparous.
