= Jan's worm snake =

Conservation status
- Critically Endangered (IUCN 3.1)

Scientific classification
- Kingdom: Animalia
- Phylum: Chordata
- Class: Reptilia
- Order: Squamata
- Suborder: Serpentes
- Family: Gerrhopilidae
- Genus: Gerrhopilus
- Species: G. mirus

Binomial name
- Gerrhopilus mirus (Jan, 1860)

Synonyms
- Typhlops mirus

Species of snake

Jan's worm snake (Gerrhopilus mirus) is a species of snake in the Gerrhopilidae family.
