= Fred Parker's blind snake =

Conservation status
- Data Deficient (IUCN 3.1)

Scientific classification
- Kingdom: Animalia
- Phylum: Chordata
- Class: Reptilia
- Order: Squamata
- Suborder: Serpentes
- Family: Gerrhopilidae
- Genus: Gerrhopilus
- Species: G. fredparkeri

Binomial name
- Gerrhopilus fredparkeri (Wallach, 1996)

Synonyms
- Typhlops fredparkeri Wallach, 1996; Gerrhopilus fredparkeri — Vidal et al., 2010

Species of snake

Fred Parker's blindsnake (Gerrhopilus fredparkeri) is a species of snake in the family Gerrhopilidae. The species is native to New Guinea.

== Etymology ==
The specific name, fredparkeri, is in honor of Australian naturalist Frederick Stanley "Fred" Parker (born 1941).

== Geographic range ==
G. fredparkeri is endemic to New Guinea and only known from the Central Province and National Capital District, Papua New Guinea.

== Habitat ==
The holotype of G. fredparkeri was collected in a compost pile in an urban garden at an altitude of about 50 m (160 ft).

== Description ==
G. fredparkeri has a rounded snout, and it has 16 longitudinal scale rows.

== Reproduction ==
G. fredparkeri is oviparous.
