= Gerrhopilus floweri =

Conservation status
- Data Deficient (IUCN 3.1)

Scientific classification
- Kingdom: Animalia
- Phylum: Chordata
- Class: Reptilia
- Order: Squamata
- Suborder: Serpentes
- Family: Gerrhopilidae
- Genus: Gerrhopilus
- Species: G. floweri

Binomial name
- Gerrhopilus floweri Boulenger, 1899

Synonyms
- Typhlops floweri Boulenger, 1899; Gerrhopilus floweri — Vidal et al., 2010

Species of snake

Gerrhopilus floweri, also known commonly as Flower's blind snake and Flower's worm snake, is a species of snake in the family Gerrhopilidae. The species is native to Southeast Asia.

== Etymology ==
The specific name, floweri, is in honor of British zoologist Stanley Smyth Flower.

== Geographic range ==
G. floweri is found in Thailand, and possibly in Laos.

== Habitat ==
G. floweri has been found in termite mounds in fruit plantations.

== Description ==
G. floweri is black dorsally, and paler ventrally. The snout and the anal region are yellowish. It may attain a total length (including tail) of 21 cm (8.3 in).

== Reproduction ==
G. floweri is oviparous.
