= T. inornatus =

T. inornatus may refer to:

- Tasmanoonops inornatus, a spider species in the genus Tasmanonops and the family Orsolobidae
- Tornatellides inornatus, a gastropod species in the genus Tornatellides
- Toxorhynchites inornatus, a mosquito species in the genus Toxorhynchites
- Triaenobunus inornatus, a harvestman species in the genus Triaenobunis and the family Triaenonychidae
- Typhlops inornatus, a snake species

== See also ==
- Inornatus
