= Gerrhopilus ceylonicus =

Conservation status
- Endangered (IUCN 3.1)

Scientific classification
- Kingdom: Animalia
- Phylum: Chordata
- Class: Reptilia
- Order: Squamata
- Suborder: Serpentes
- Family: Gerrhopilidae
- Genus: Gerrhopilus
- Species: G. ceylonicus

Binomial name
- Gerrhopilus ceylonicus (Smith, 1943)

Synonyms
- Typhlops ceylonicus Smith, 1943

Species of snake

Gerrhopilus ceylonicus, also known as the Sri Lanka worm snake, is a species of snake in the family of Gerrhopilidae. It is endemic to Sri Lanka.
