= Khao Nan National Park =

National park in Thailand

- IUCN category II (national park)
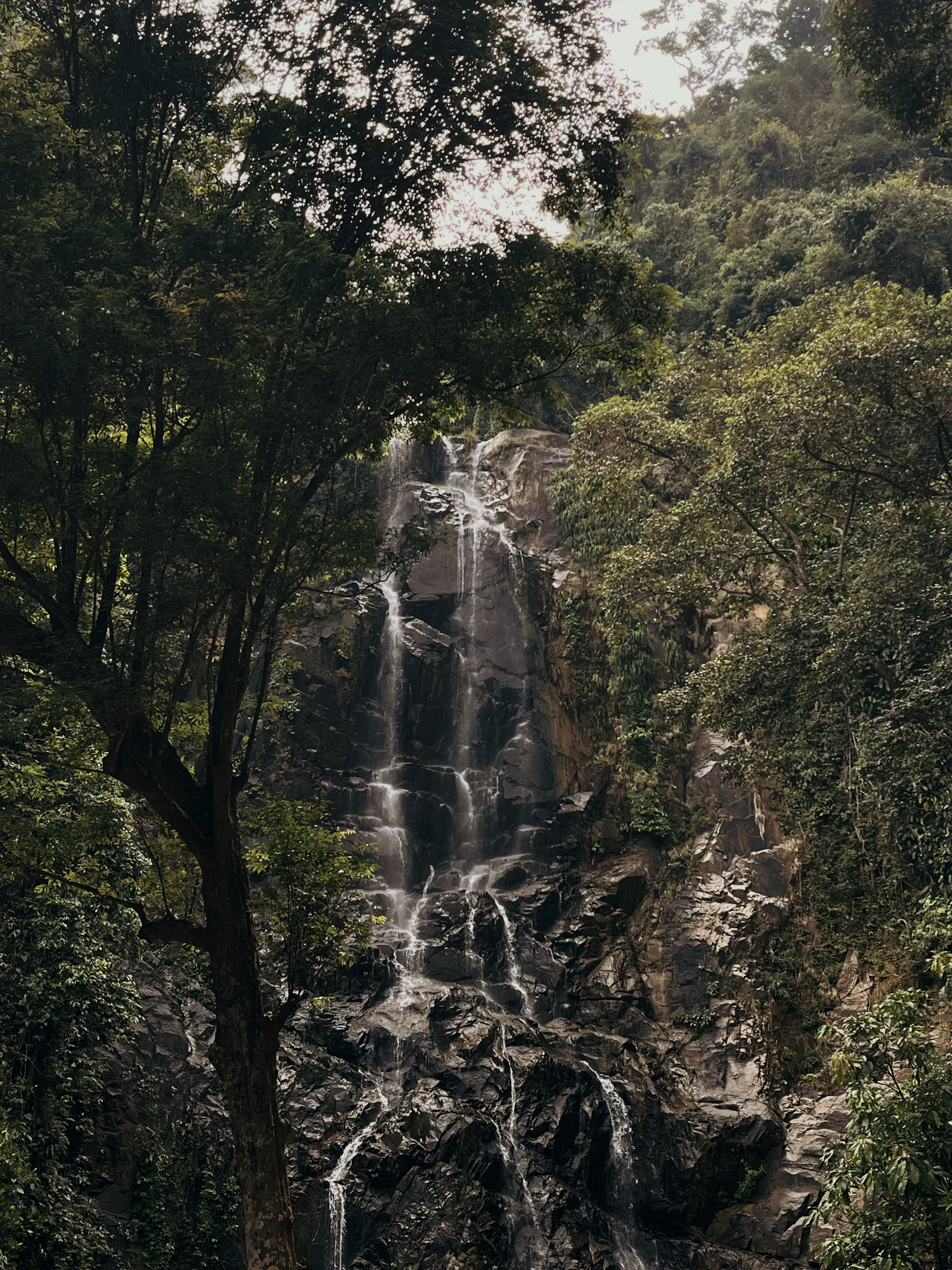

- Park location in Thailand
- Location: Thailand
- Nearest city: Nakhon Si Thammarat
- Coordinates: 8.7738°N 99.8157°E
- Area: 410 km^{2} (160 sq mi)
- Established: 2009
- Governing body: Department of National Parks, Wildlife and Plant Conservation

Khao Nan National Park (Thai: อุทยานแห่งชาติเขานัน) is a national park in Nakhon Si Thammarat province, Thailand. The park is home to tropical forests, waterfalls and caves.

== Geography ==
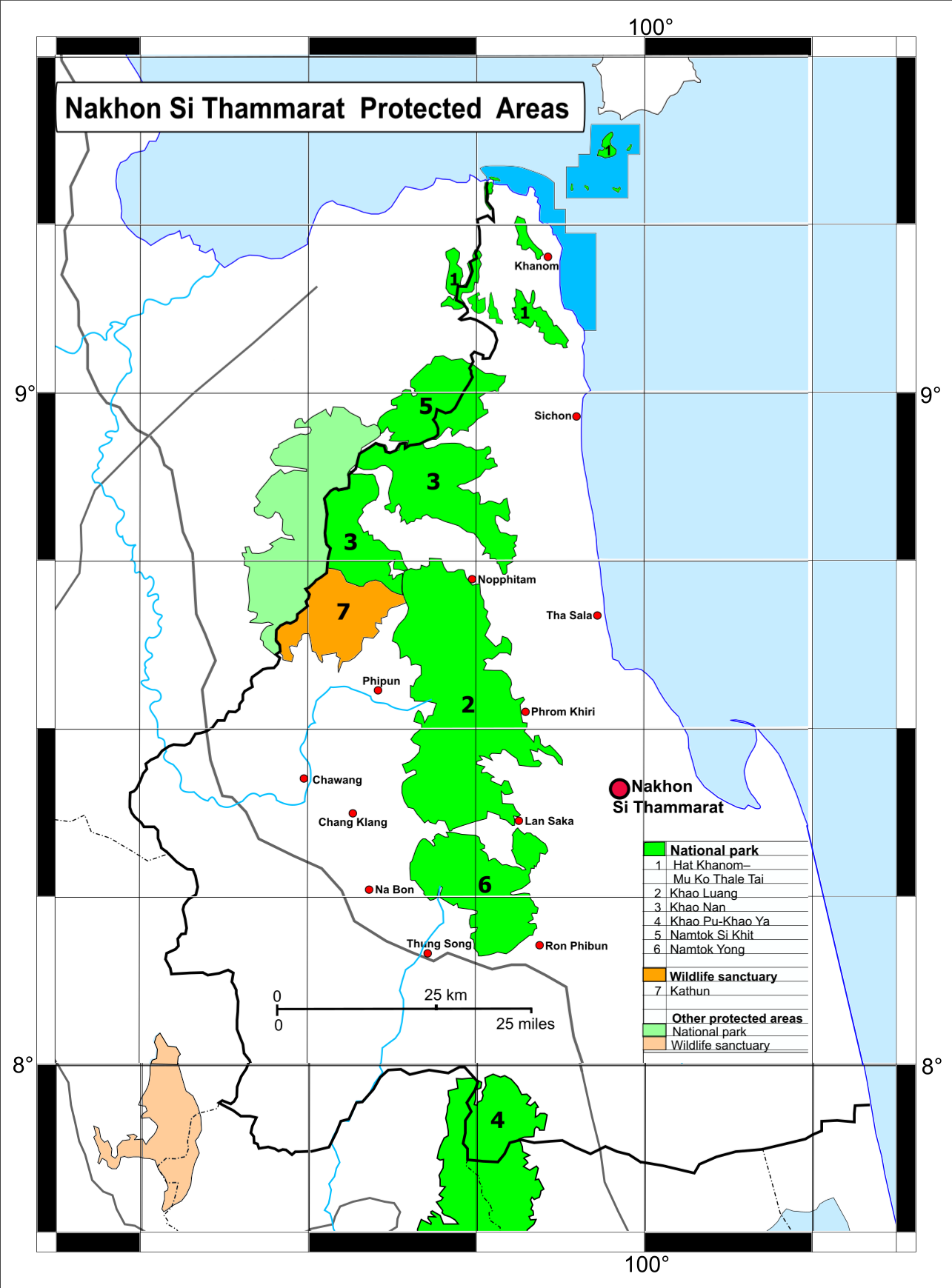
Protected areas of Nakhon Si Thammarat province

Khao Nan National Park is in the Tha Sala, Sichon and Nopphitam districts of Nakhon Si Thammarat province. It is about 30 km (19 mi) from Tha Sala village. The park's area is 410 km^{2} (160 sq mi).

The highest point is Khao Nan peak at 1,438 m (4,718 ft), part of the Nakhon Si Thammarat Range. The park is bordered by Khao Luang and Tai Romyen National Parks.

== Attractions ==
The park's largest waterfall is Sunantha. Other park waterfalls include Krung Nang, Khlong Talik and Khao Dai. Trails include the Bua Chaek Yai Nature Trail and in 2026 the new 5.5 km (3.4 mi) Yod Khao Khom Trail opened, leading to the summit of Khao Khom. The park hosts a number of caves including Hong and Krung Nang.

== Flora and fauna ==
Plant species in the park include Dipterocarpus alatus, Elateriospermum tapos, Hopea odorata, Intsia palembanica and Parashorea stellata. Elateriospermum tapos occupies an area of about 8 km^{2} (3 sq mi), which turns red each year from February to April. Also present are fern species including Cheiropleuria.

The park is home to two endemic lizard species, Pseudocalotes khaonanensis and Larutia nubisilvicola. Both are known only from an area of cloud forest at about 1,300 m (4,300 ft) elevation. Other animal species include serow, Malayan tapir and civet.
