= Stanley Smyth Flower =

English army officer, science advisor, administrator, zoologist and conservationist

Major Stanley Smyth Flower OBE
- Born: 1 August 1871; Lincoln's Inn Fields, London, England
- Died: 3 February 1946 (aged 74); Tring, Hertfordshire, England
- Military career
- Allegiance: United Kingdom
- Branch: British Army
- Rank: Major
- Unit: Royal Northumberland Fusiliers
- Commands: Egyptian Camel Transport Corps
- Conflicts: World War I Sinai and Palestine Campaign
- Awards: OBE
- Other work: Zoologist

Major Stanley Smyth Flower OBE FLS FZS (1 August 1871 – 3 February 1946) was an English army officer, science advisor, administrator, zoologist and conservationist.

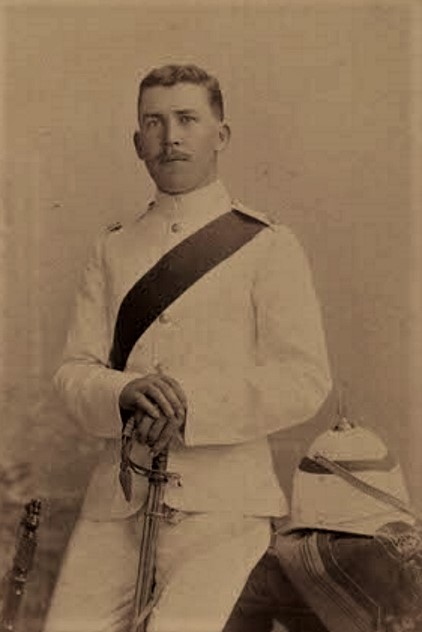
Stanley Smyth Flower (1871-1946)

== Early years ==
Second son of Sir William Henry Flower FRS and his wife Georgiana Rosetta, daughter of Admiral William Henry Smyth FRS, he was born on 1 August 1871 in the Hunterian Museum in London of which his father was then Curator,

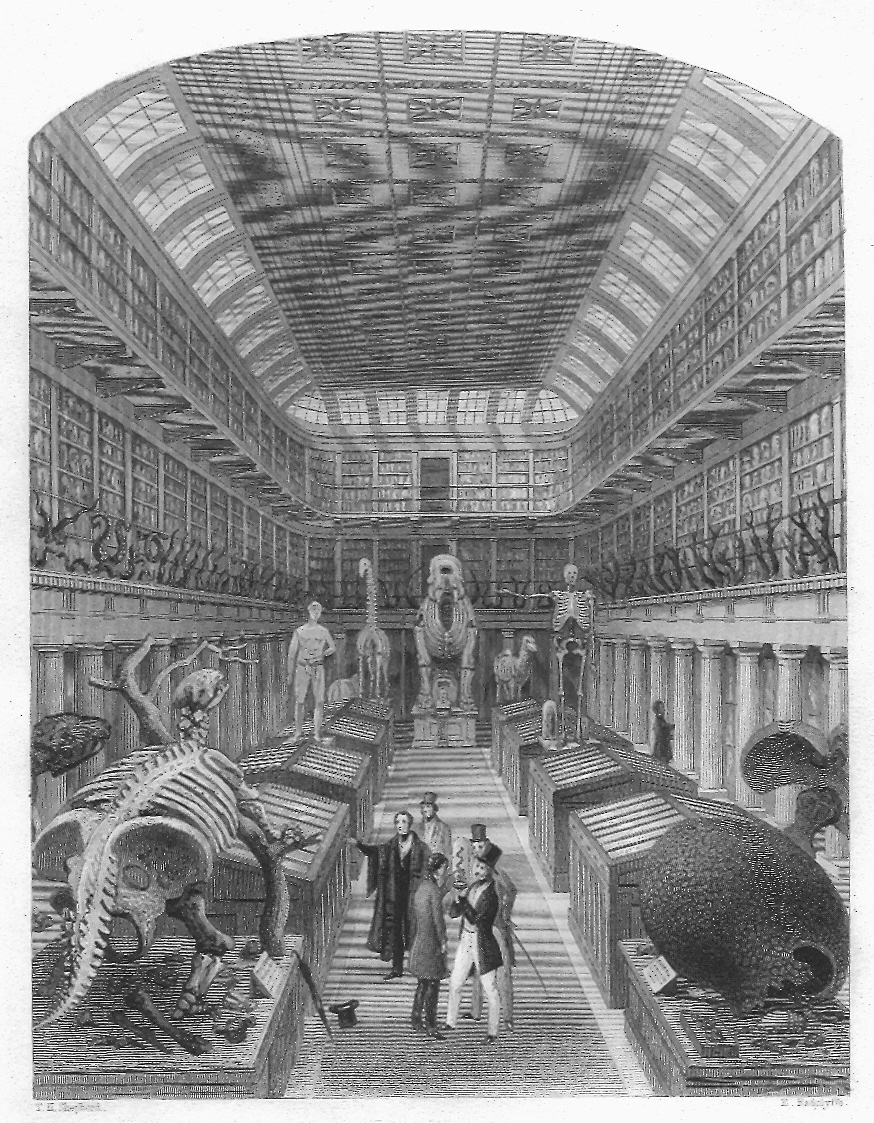
The main exhibit room of the Hunterian Museum in 1853

and was baptised in St Cross Church, Oxford on 3 September 1871. Among his first cousins were Sir Archibald Dennis Flower, head of the family brewery, the soldier Nevill Smyth VC, and Robert Baden-Powell, founder of the Boy Scout movement. Taking an early interest in natural history, from the age of eleven he regularly went to meetings of the Zoological Society of London with his father. After attending Wellington College, Berkshire, he studied at King's College London and joined the Artists' Rifles.

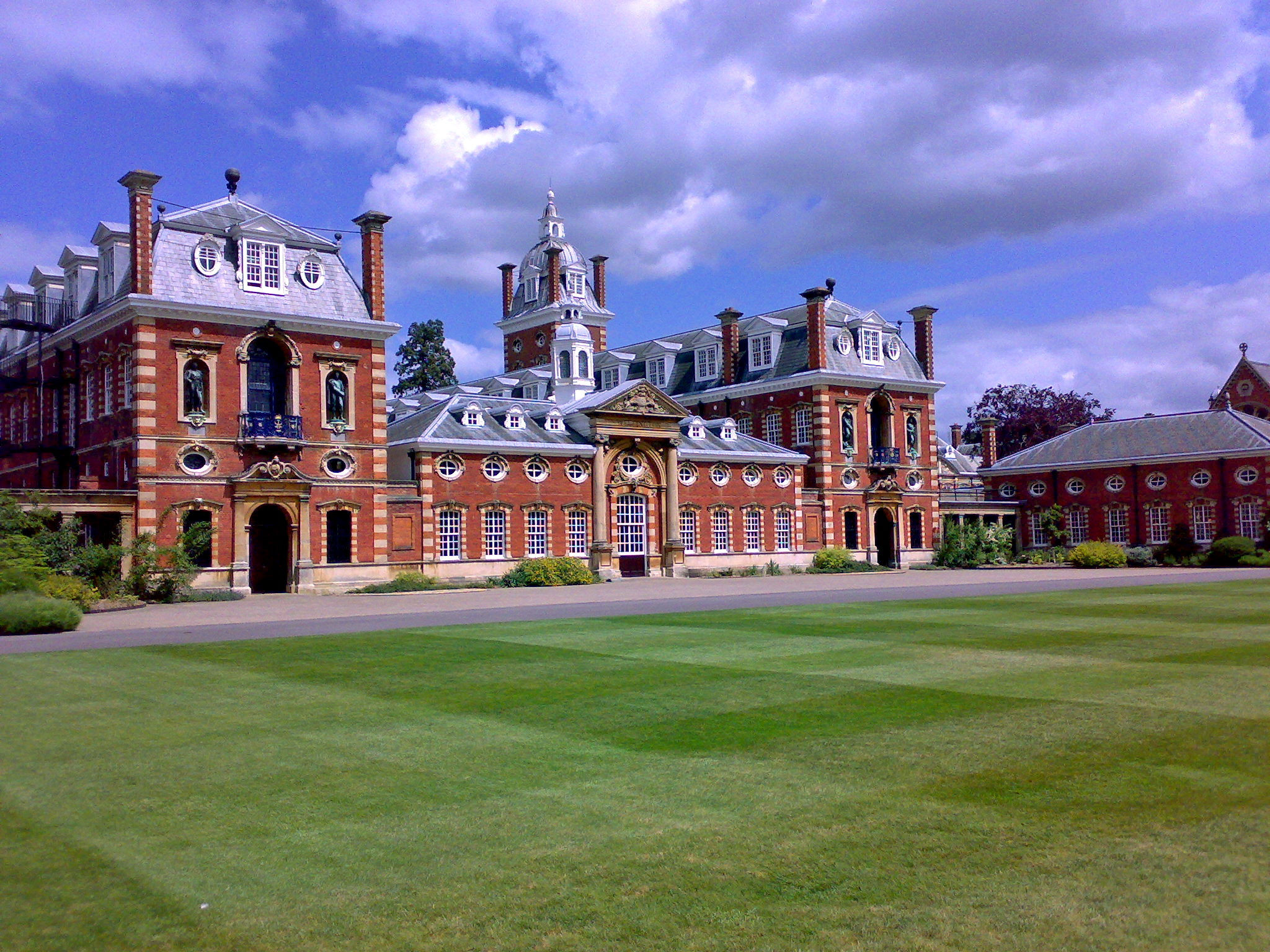
Wellington College, Berkshire

In February 1890 he was commissioned as a second lieutenant into the 3rd (Militia) Battalion of the Northumberland Fusiliers (later the Royal Northumberland Fusiliers), before receiving a commission in the Regular Army on 23 April 1893, and was promoted to lieutenant on 19 December 1893. With his regiment he went to India and the Straits Settlements, where he studied the fauna.

== Scientific career ==
In 1896 the government of Siam was looking for a scientific advisor to manage the collections in the Royal Museum and he was awarded the post.

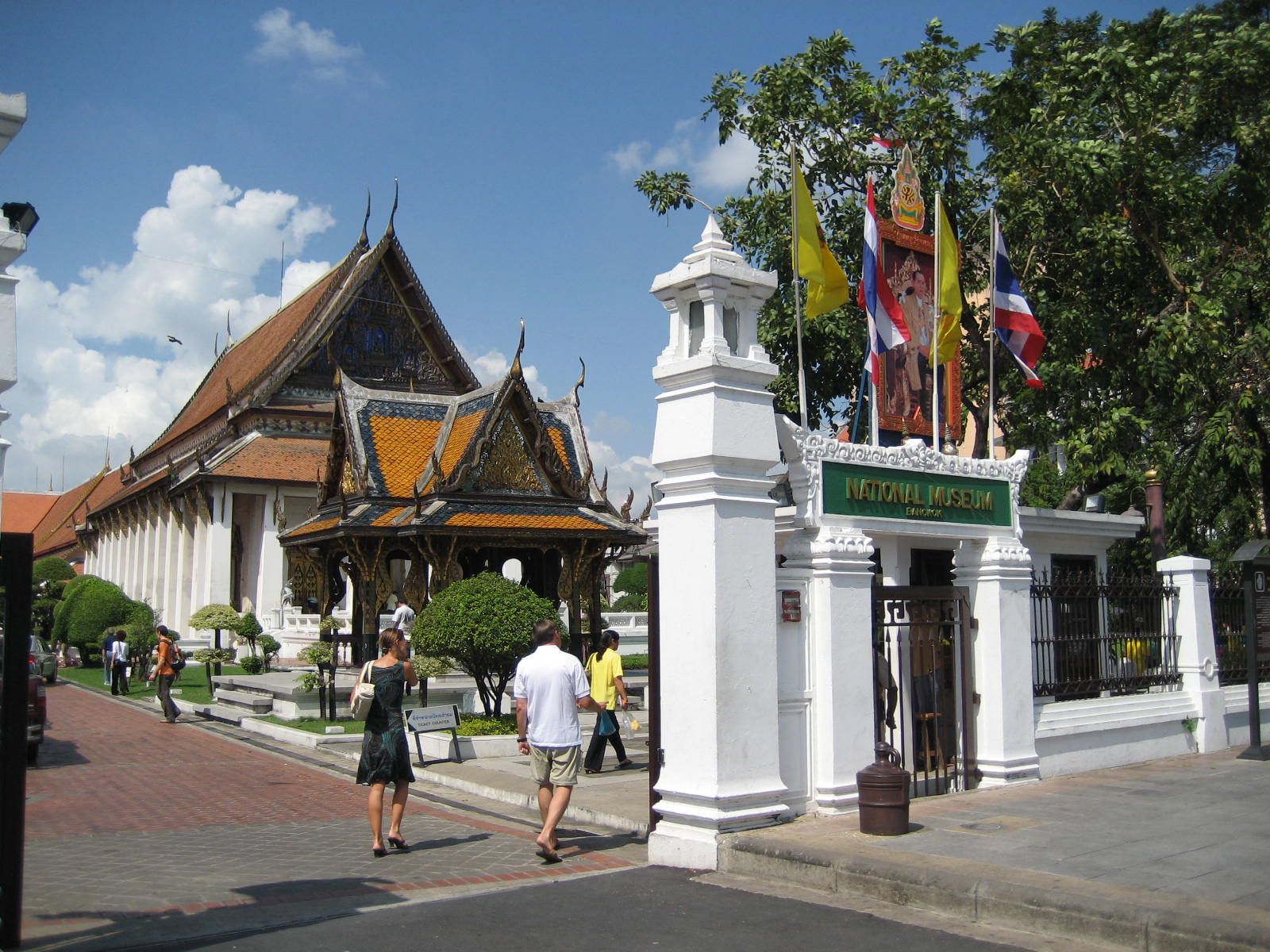
Bangkok National Museum

Given leave by the British Army, he married his fiancée and the two set off for Bangkok. While there, they were able to make several trips in Siam and the Malay Peninsula to study the vertebrate fauna. A snake he collected there was described as a species new to science and named Typhlops floweri after him by George Albert Boulenger in 1899. In 2010 the species was moved to the genus Gerrhopilus as Gerrhopilus floweri. In 1912 Boulenger named a species of lizard Calotes floweri after Flower, the scientific name of which was changed to Pseudocalotes floweri in 1980. In 1898 the government of Egypt under Lord Cromer wanted to appoint a Director of the Zoological Gardens at Giza and he gained the post, which he held until his retirement.

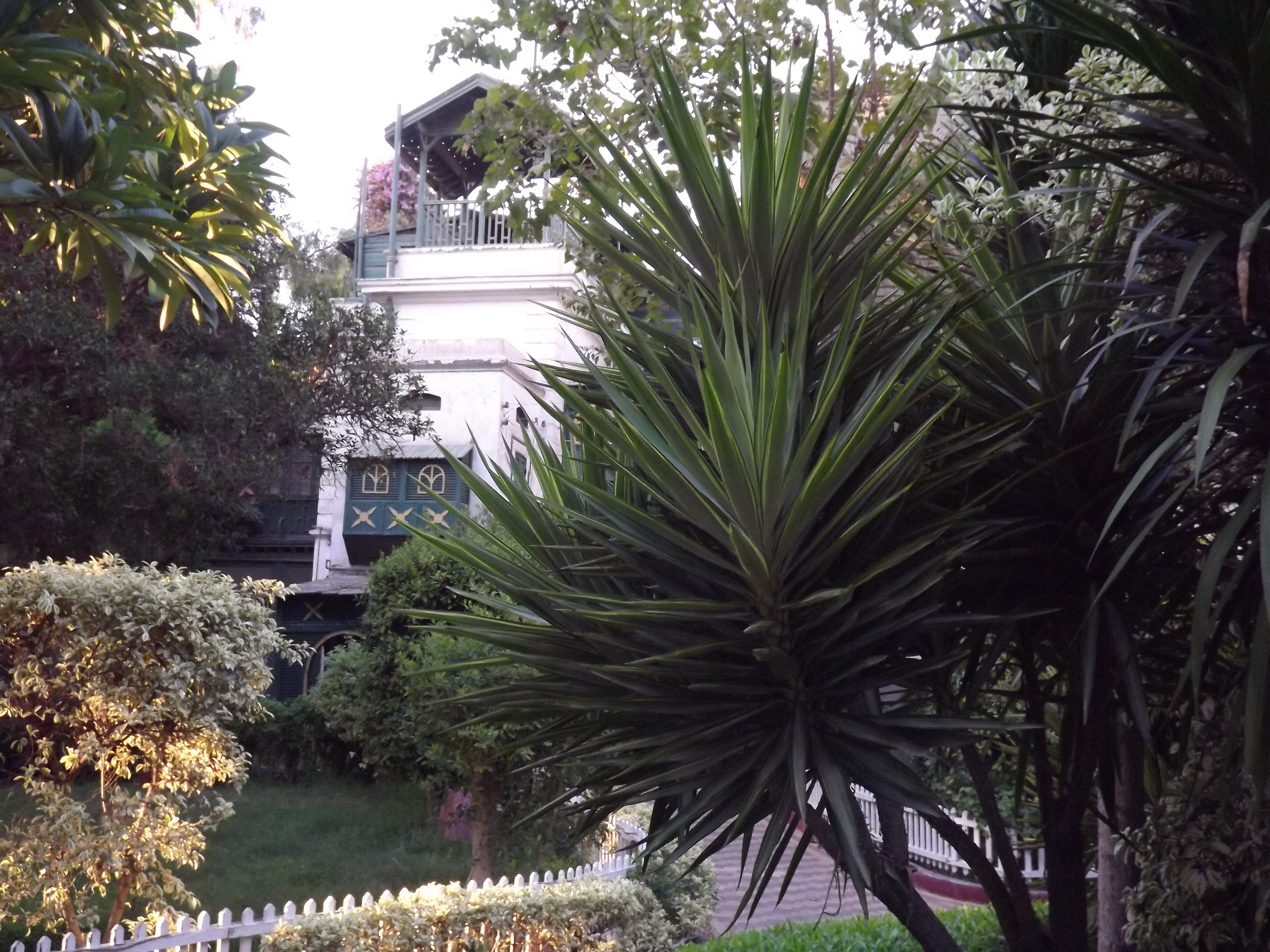
Director's House in Giza Zoo

While still on leave from his regiment, he was promoted captain on 17 February 1900.

In 1913 Field-Marshal Lord Kitchener sent him to India to report on the collections of wild animals held in captivity there. In a letter from Egypt that year, Rudyard Kipling wrote that Flower was "one of the most interesting men I have ever met".

While in Egypt, he organised the Zoological Museum in a building in Giza Zoo, started the Fish Garden with aquarium on Gezira Island, and was appointed Ranger of Central Africa.

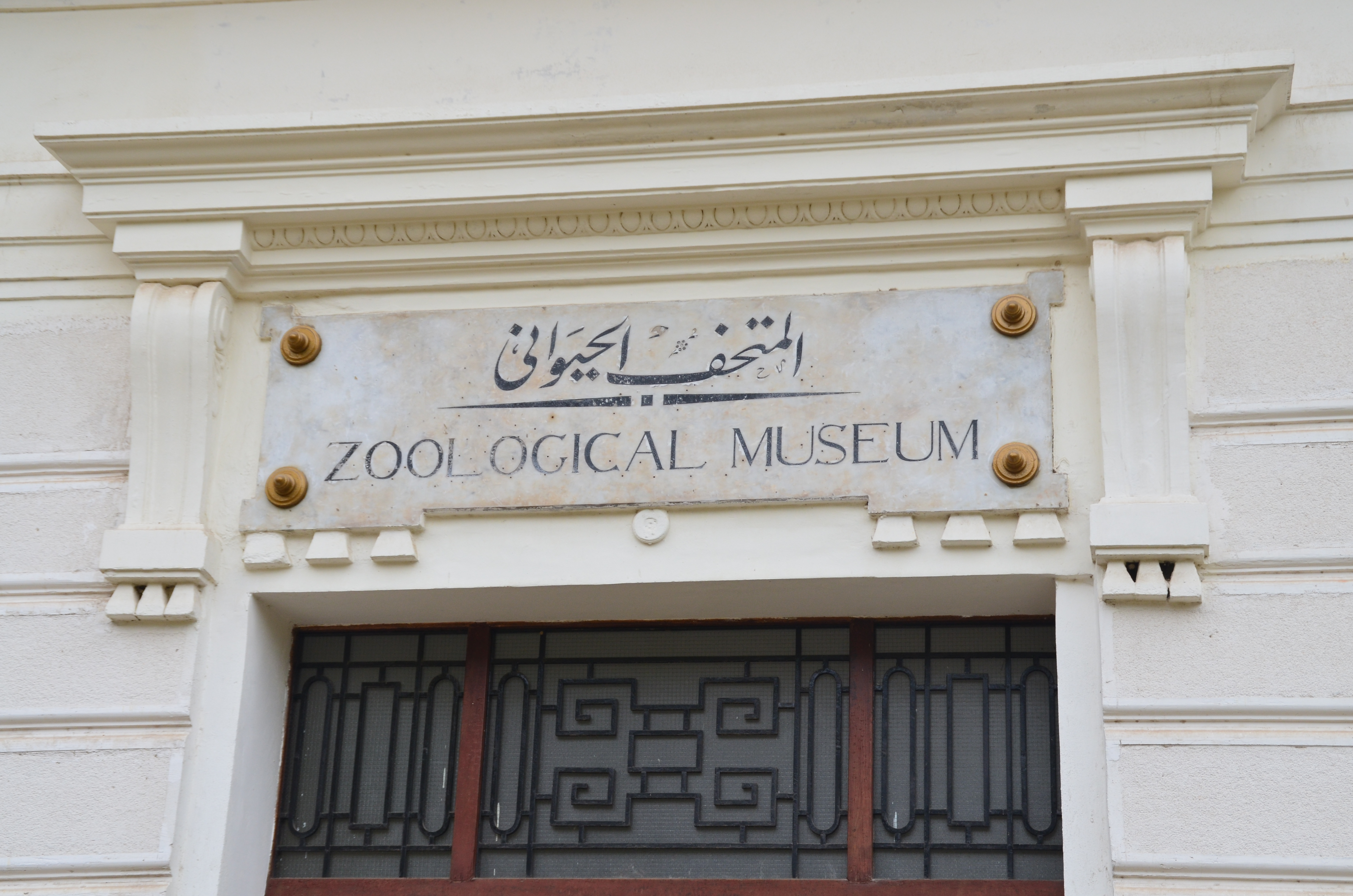
Zoological Museum in Giza Zoo

As well as establishing and enforcing game laws in Egypt and Sudan, he was active both in identification of unknown species and conservation of known species at risk. To him is ascribed the preservation of the egret, threatened with extinction for its plumes, that was protected by law in Egypt from 1912.

== First World War and aftermath ==
Recalled to the British Army on 5 November 1914, his knowledge of Egypt and its animals was used to set up and run the Egyptian Camel Transport Corps, a logistical unit which carried much of the supplies needed by the British Empire forces fighting the Ottoman Empire in the Sinai and Palestine Campaign.

Once the Turks were beaten at the end of 1918, the Egyptians rose against British rule in the Egyptian Revolution of 1919. Acting as Inspector of the Interior and as Political Officer, he maintained order in Giza and for his role in this conflict was appointed an OBE.

== Later years ==
In April 1924, his health impaired, he resigned his post and with his wife returned to England to settle near Tring, where he could pursue his studies at the Walter Rothschild Zoological Museum. During his retirement, he visited many zoos around the world and wrote many papers on mammals, birds, reptiles, fishes and amphibians of Egypt as well as on animal longevity. He was vice-president of the Zoological Society of London from 1927 to 1929 and chair of the British Ornithologists' Club from 1930 to 1933. He died at Tring on 3 February 1946 and was buried in the town cemetery, with his will being proved at Oxford on 6 June 1946.

== Family ==
On 30 September 1896 at Worplesdon in Surrey he married Sibylla Maria Peckham Wallace, known as Sybil (1876–1938), the elder daughter of Charles William Napier Wallace (1849–1910), a grandson of General Peter Margetson Wallace, and his first wife Frances Henrietta Peckham (1847–1893), a granddaughter of Bishop Robert James Carr. They had four children. After the death of his first wife, on 4 May 1939 at Marylebone in London he married Charlotte Dorothea Rose Stewart (1889–1981), who survived him.

== Selected publications ==
- Report on a zoological mission to India, 1913. Cairo: Government Press. 1914.
- The principal species of birds protected by law in Egypt, giving their English, French, Arabic, and scientific names, their local status, their approximate size, and concise notes on their coloration, for purposes of identification. 1918.
- List of fishes, 1901–1921. Cairo: Government Press. 1921.
- List of the vertebrated animals exhibited in the gardens of the Zoological Society of London, 1828–1927 (10th ed.). London: The Zoological Society. 1929.
