= Pseudocalotes guttalineatus =

Scientific classification
- Kingdom: Animalia
- Phylum: Chordata
- Class: Reptilia
- Order: Squamata
- Suborder: Iguania
- Family: Agamidae
- Genus: Pseudocalotes
- Species: P. guttalineatus

Binomial name
- Pseudocalotes guttalineatus Harvey, Hamidy, Kurniawan, Shaney, & Smith, 2014

Species of lizard

Pseudocalotes guttalineatus, the dash-lined false garden lizard, is a species of agamid lizard. It is endemic to Indonesia.
