= Montane blind snake =

Conservation status
- Least Concern (IUCN 3.1)

Scientific classification
- Kingdom: Animalia
- Phylum: Chordata
- Class: Reptilia
- Order: Squamata
- Suborder: Serpentes
- Family: Gerrhopilidae
- Genus: Gerrhopilus
- Species: G. inornatus

Binomial name
- Gerrhopilus inornatus (Boulenger, 1888)

Synonyms
- Typhlops inornatus

Species of snake

The montane blind snake (Gerrhopilus inornatus) is a species of snake in the Gerrhopilidae family.
