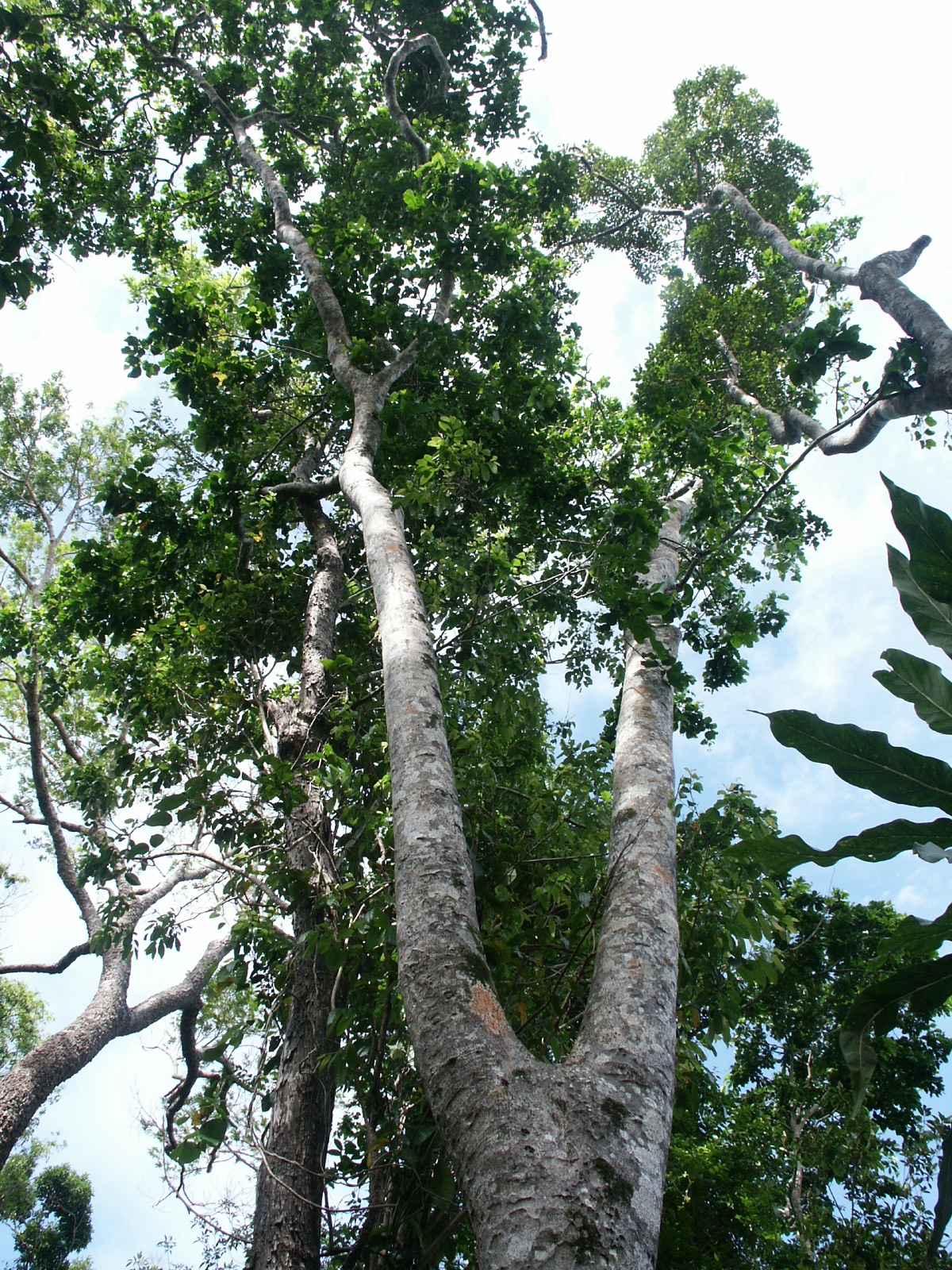
- Intsia bijuga

Scientific classification
- Kingdom: Plantae
- Clade: Tracheophytes
- Clade: Angiosperms
- Clade: Eudicots
- Clade: Rosids
- Order: Fabales
- Family: Fabaceae
- Subfamily: Detarioideae
- Tribe: Afzelieae
- Genus: Intsia; Thouars (1806)

Species
- Intsia bijuga (Colebr.) Kuntze; Intsia palembanica Miq.

= Intsia =

Genus of legumes

Intsia is a genus of flowering plants in the family Fabaceae. It includes two species which range from eastern Africa and Madagascar to India, Indochina, Malaysia, Papua New Guinea, northern Australia, and the south Pacific. They are trees which grow up to 40 (–45) meters tall, often buttressed, evergreen and unarmed. Typical habitat is humid tropical lowland forest including coastal forest on sand, rain forest, mangrove fringes and tidal river mouths, and occasionally inland on hills.

- Intsia bijuga (Colebr.) Kuntze – Zanzibar, Madagascar, and the Indian Ocean Islands to India, Indochina, Taiwan, Malaysia, Papua New Guinea, and the southwestern Pacific
- Intsia palembanica Miq. – Bangladesh, Myanmar, Thailand, Malaysia, and New Guinea
