= Pseudocalotes saravacensis =

Conservation status
- Data Deficient (IUCN 3.1)

Scientific classification
- Kingdom: Animalia
- Phylum: Chordata
- Class: Reptilia
- Order: Squamata
- Suborder: Iguania
- Family: Agamidae
- Genus: Pseudocalotes
- Species: P. saravacensis

Binomial name
- Pseudocalotes saravacensis Inger & Stuebing, 1994

Species of lizard

Pseudocalotes saravacensis is a species of agamid lizard. It is found in Malaysia.
