= Pseudocalotes kingdonwardi =

Conservation status
- Least Concern (IUCN 3.1)

Scientific classification
- Kingdom: Animalia
- Phylum: Chordata
- Class: Reptilia
- Order: Squamata
- Suborder: Iguania
- Family: Agamidae
- Genus: Pseudocalotes
- Species: P. kingdonwardi

Binomial name
- Pseudocalotes kingdonwardi (M.A. Smith, 1935)

Synonyms
- Calotes kingdon-wardi M.A. Smith, 1935; Calotes kingdonwardi M.A. Smith, 1935; Japalura kaulbacki M.A. Smith, 1937; Pseudocalotes kaulbacki (M.A. Smith, 1937)

Species of lizard

Pseudocalotes kingdonwardi, also known commonly as Kingdon-Ward's bloodsucker, is a species of lizard in the family Agamidae. The species is native to China and Myanmar.

== Etymology ==
The specific name, kingdonwardi, is in honor of English botanist Francis "Frank" Kingdon-Ward.

== Description ==
Dorsally, P. kingdonwardi is grayish brown with dark brown markings; ventrally it is grayish white. The holotype of P. kingdonwardi, a juvenile male, has a snout-to-vent length of 4 cm (1.6 in), plus a tail length of 8 cm (3.1 in). The holotype of the junior synonym "kaulbacki", also a juvenile male, has an SVL of 7 cm (2.8 in), plus a tail length of 12.5 cm (4.9 in). The scales on the side of the trunk point obliquely downward.

== Habitat ==
The preferred natural habitat of P. kingdonwardi is forest, at altitudes as high as 7,000 feet (2,130 m).

== Reproduction ==
P. kingdonwardi is oviparous.
