= Pseudocalotes poilani =

Conservation status
- Endangered (IUCN 3.1)

Scientific classification
- Kingdom: Animalia
- Phylum: Chordata
- Class: Reptilia
- Order: Squamata
- Suborder: Iguania
- Family: Agamidae
- Genus: Pseudocalotes
- Species: P. poilani

Binomial name
- Pseudocalotes poilani (Bourret, 1939))

Species of lizard

Pseudocalotes poilani, the Laotian false bloodsucker, is a species of agamid lizard. It is found in Laos
