= Pseudocalotes rhaegal =

Conservation status
- Critically Endangered (IUCN 3.1)

Scientific classification
- Kingdom: Animalia
- Phylum: Chordata
- Class: Reptilia
- Order: Squamata
- Suborder: Iguania
- Family: Agamidae
- Genus: Pseudocalotes
- Species: P. rhaegal

Binomial name
- Pseudocalotes rhaegal Grismer, Quah, Wood, Anuar, Muin, Davis, Murdoch, Grismer, Cota, & Cobos, 2016

Species of lizard

Pseudocalotes rhaegal, or Rhaegal's false garden lizard, is a species of agamid lizard.

== Etymology ==
In 2016, three new species of Pseudocalotes were described from the sky islands of the Titiwangsa Mountains in Malaysia. The three species consist of Pseudocalotes drogon, Pseudocalotes viserion, and Pseudocalotes rhaegal. They are named after the three dragons of Daenerys Targaryen from George R. R. Martin's A Song of Ice and Fire, with each species bearing similar colours to their namesake dragon.

== Distribution ==
Pseudocalotes rhaegal has been found in the Cameron Highlands District of Pahang, Malaysia.
