= Gerrhopilus ater =

Scientific classification
- Kingdom: Animalia
- Phylum: Chordata
- Class: Reptilia
- Order: Squamata
- Suborder: Serpentes
- Family: Gerrhopilidae
- Genus: Gerrhopilus
- Species: G. ater

Binomial name
- Gerrhopilus ater (Schlegel, 1839)

Synonyms
- Typhlops ater; Anilios ater

Species of snake

Gerrhopilus ater, also known as the black blind snake, is a species of snake in the Gerrhopilidae family.
