= Pseudocalotes brevipes =

Conservation status
- Least Concern (IUCN 3.1)

Scientific classification
- Kingdom: Animalia
- Phylum: Chordata
- Class: Reptilia
- Order: Squamata
- Suborder: Iguania
- Family: Agamidae
- Genus: Pseudocalotes
- Species: P. brevipes

Binomial name
- Pseudocalotes brevipes (Werner, 1904)
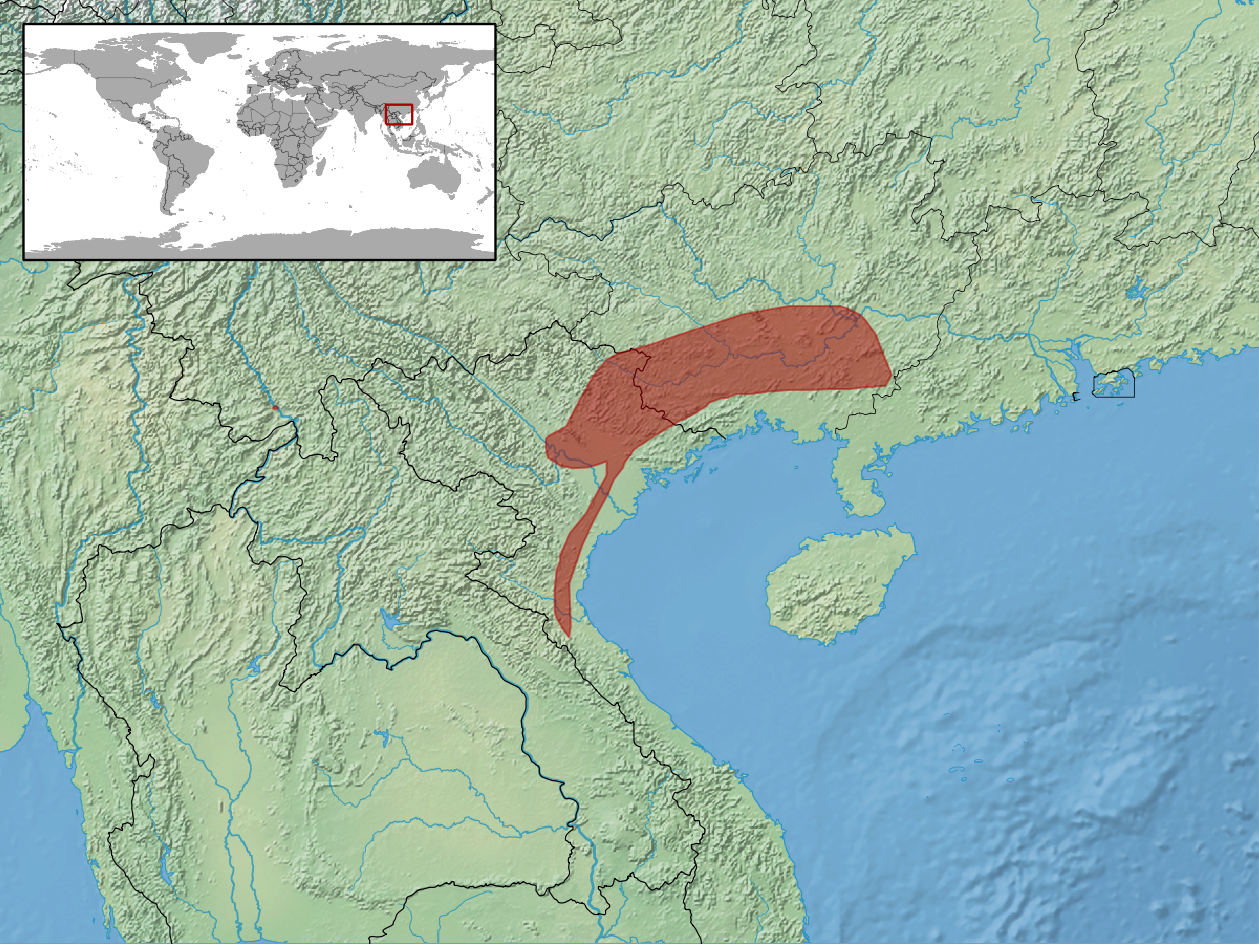

Species of lizard

Pseudocalotes brevipes, the Vietnam false bloodsucker, is a species of agamid lizard. It is found in China and Vietnam.
