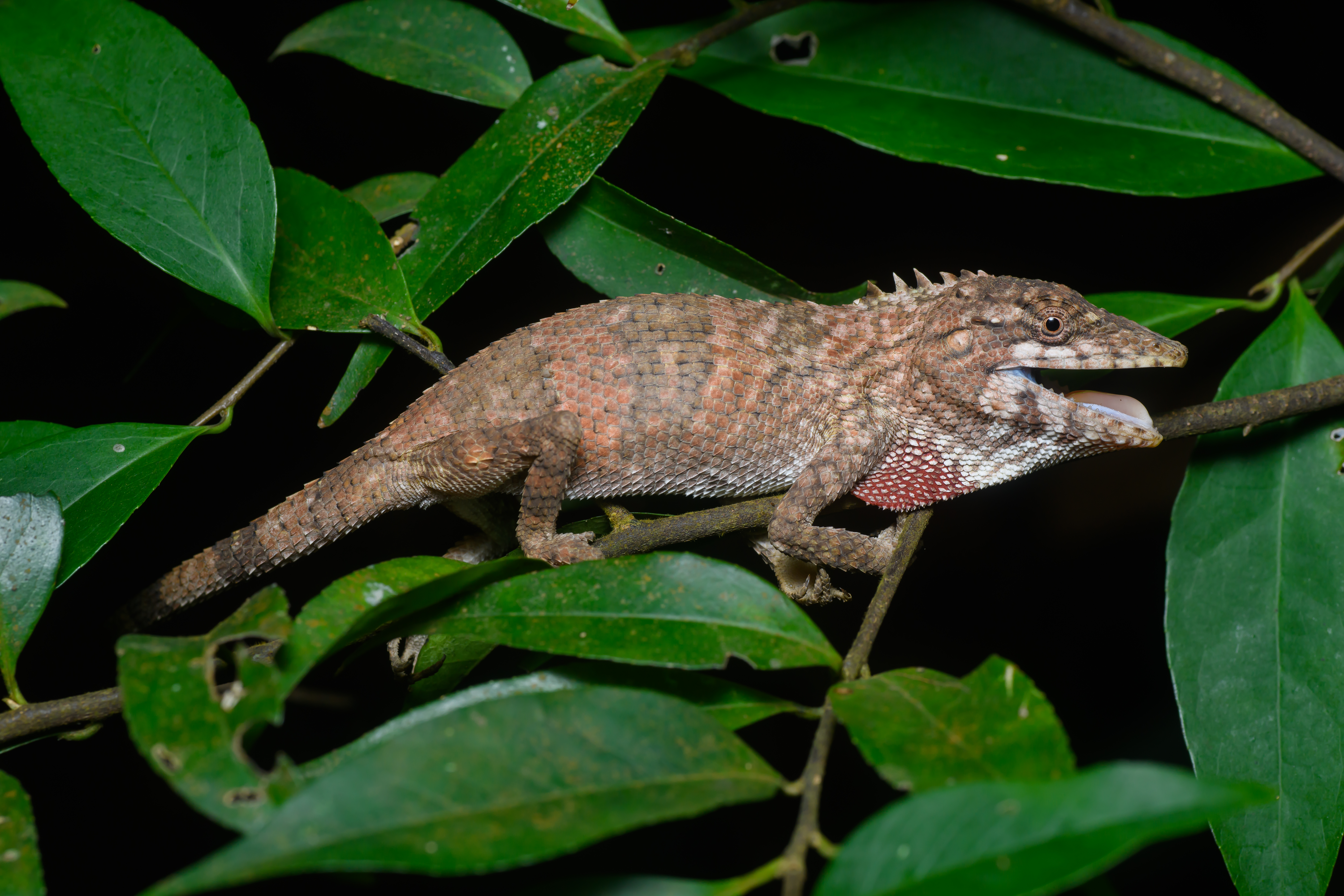
- Pseudocalotes floweri at Khao Khitchakut National Park

Conservation status
- Vulnerable (IUCN 3.1)

Scientific classification
- Kingdom: Animalia
- Phylum: Chordata
- Class: Reptilia
- Order: Squamata
- Suborder: Iguania
- Family: Agamidae
- Genus: Pseudocalotes
- Species: P. floweri

Binomial name
- Pseudocalotes floweri (Boulenger, 1912)

Synonyms
- Calotes floweri Boulenger, 1912; Pseudocalotes floweri — Moody, 1980

= Pseudocalotes floweri =

Species of lizard

Pseudocalotes floweri, also commonly known as Flower's forest agamid, Flower's long-headed lizard, and the Thai false bloodsucker, is a species of lizard in the family Agamidae. The species is native to Southeast Asia.

== Etymology ==
The specific name, floweri, is in honor of British zoologist Stanley Smyth Flower.

== Geographic range ==
P. floweri is found in Cambodia, southeastern Thailand, and central Vietnam.

== Habitat ==
The preferred natural habitat of P. floweri is forest, at altitudes of 862–1,000 m (2,828–3,281 ft).

== Description ==
P. floweri may attain a snout-to-vent length (SVL) of 9.5 cm (3.7 in), and a tail length of 17.5 cm (6.9 in).

== Behavior ==
P. floweri is arboreal.

== Reproduction ==
P. floweri is oviparous.
