= Pseudocalotes baliomus =

Scientific classification
- Kingdom: Animalia
- Phylum: Chordata
- Class: Reptilia
- Order: Squamata
- Suborder: Iguania
- Family: Agamidae
- Genus: Pseudocalotes
- Species: P. baliomus

Binomial name
- Pseudocalotes baliomus Harvey, Shaney, Hamidy, Kurniawan, & Smith, 2017

Species of lizard

Pseudocalotes baliomus, the spot-shouldered false garden lizard, is a species of agamid lizard. It is endemic to Indonesia.
