= Pseudocalotes ziegleri =

Scientific classification
- Kingdom: Animalia
- Phylum: Chordata
- Class: Reptilia
- Order: Squamata
- Suborder: Iguania
- Family: Agamidae
- Genus: Pseudocalotes
- Species: P. ziegleri

Binomial name
- Pseudocalotes ziegleri Hallermann, Truong, Orlov, & Ananjeva, 2010

Species of lizard

Pseudocalotes ziegleri, Ziegler's tree lizard, is a species of agamid lizard. It is endemic to Vietnam.
