= Pseudocalotes larutensis =

Conservation status
- Vulnerable (IUCN 3.1)

Scientific classification
- Kingdom: Animalia
- Phylum: Chordata
- Class: Reptilia
- Order: Squamata
- Suborder: Iguania
- Family: Agamidae
- Genus: Pseudocalotes
- Species: P. larutensis

Binomial name
- Pseudocalotes larutensis Hallermann & McGuire, 2001

Species of lizard

Pseudocalotes larutensis, the Bukit Larut false garden lizard, is a species of agamid which lives in Malaysia.
