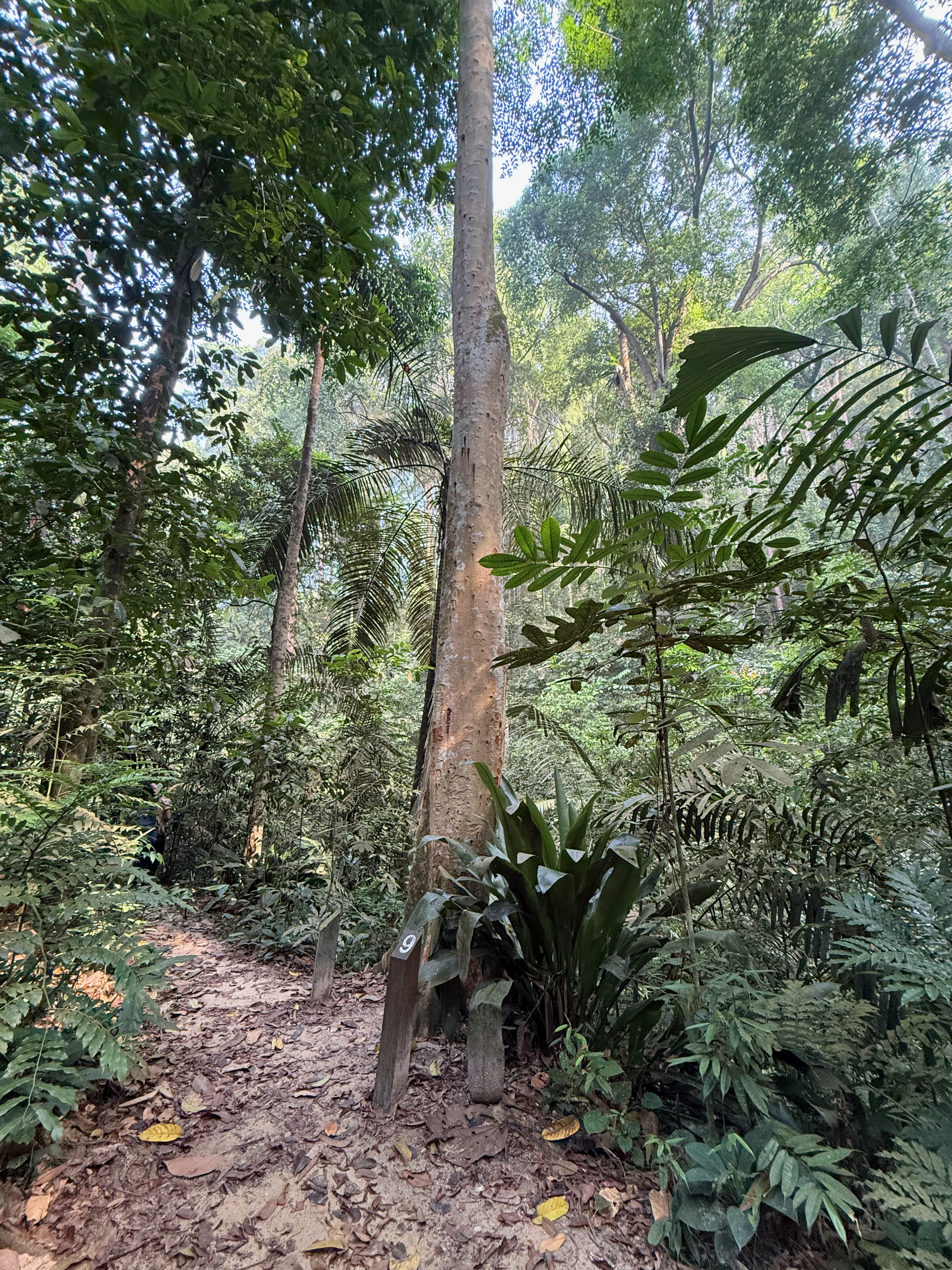
- Malacca teak at FRIM Kepong, Malaysia

Conservation status
- Near Threatened (IUCN 3.1)

Scientific classification
- Kingdom: Plantae
- Clade: Tracheophytes
- Clade: Angiosperms
- Clade: Eudicots
- Clade: Rosids
- Order: Fabales
- Family: Fabaceae
- Genus: Intsia
- Species: I. palembanica

Binomial name
- Intsia palembanica Miq.

= Intsia palembanica =

Species of legume

Intsia palembanica is a species of flowering plant in the family Fabaceae. The specific epithet palembanica is for Palembang in Sumatra, Indonesia. Common names include Borneo teak, Malacca teak and Moluccan ironwood. It is native to a wide area of tropical Asia including Bangladesh, Myanmar, the Andaman and Nicobar Islands, Thailand, Malaysia, Indonesia and Papua New Guinea. Intsia palembanica differs from Intsia bijuga in the number of leaflets that make up the compound leaves.

== Names ==
On the Indonesian island of Sumatra specifically, it is better-known as marbau, etymologically derived from Minangkabau, a native Sumatran language commonly spoken in western and southeastern Sumatra regions. It is anglicized as marbow in British English.

== Conservation ==
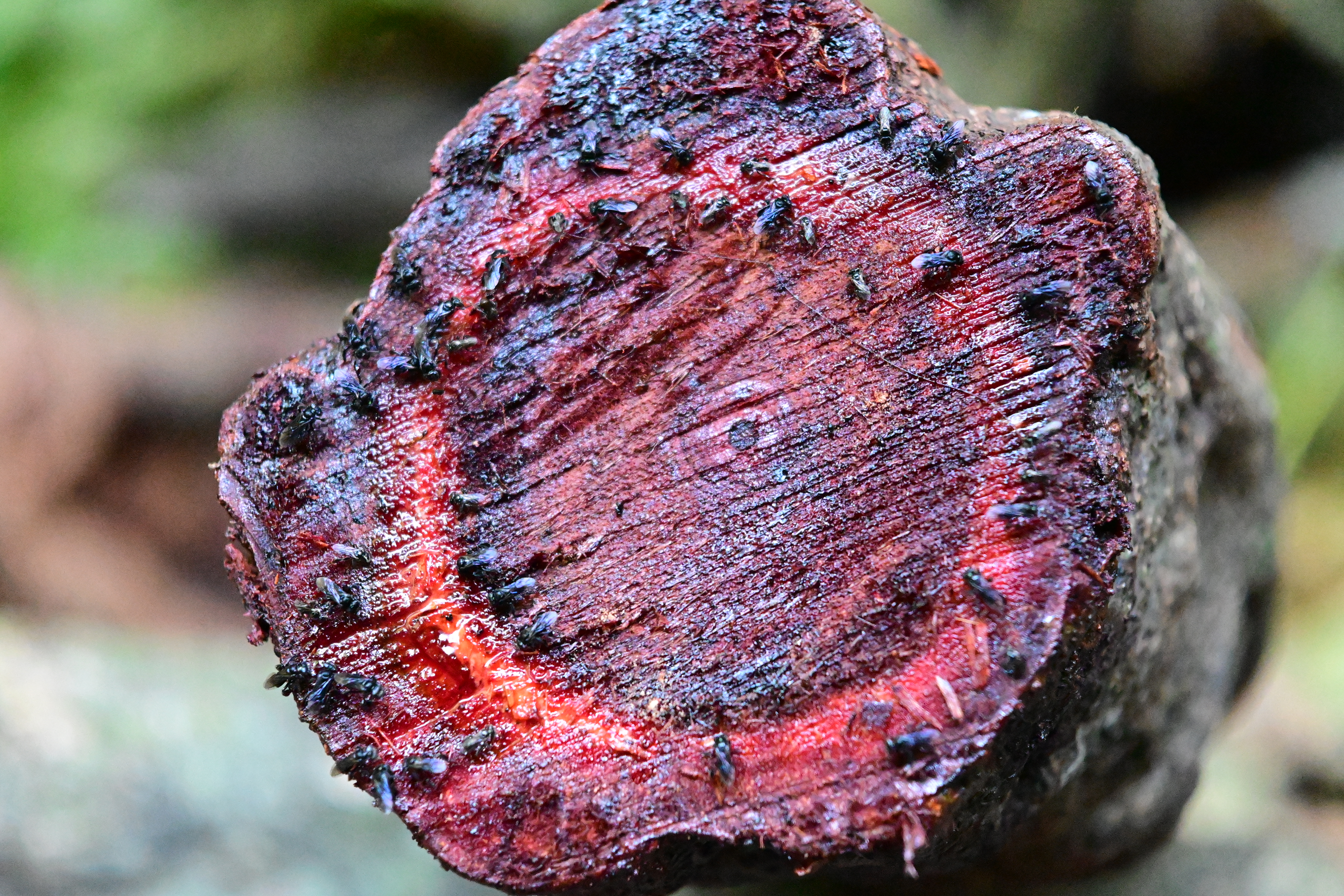
Cross-section of a Merbau tree trunk

Intsia palembanica has been assessed as near threatened on the IUCN Red List. It is mainly threatened by logging for its timber, particularly in Indonesia, Malaysia and Papua New Guinea. The timber is sold locally and internationally.

== Symbolism ==
On 23 August 2019, the tree, locally known as pokok merbau, officially became the national tree of Malaysia. The then-Prime Minister, Mahathir Mohamad, stated that it represented the strength and endurance of Malaysia's people.
