= Pseudocalotes dringi =

Conservation status
- Least Concern (IUCN 3.1)

Scientific classification
- Kingdom: Animalia
- Phylum: Chordata
- Class: Reptilia
- Order: Squamata
- Suborder: Iguania
- Family: Agamidae
- Genus: Pseudocalotes
- Species: P. dringi

Binomial name
- Pseudocalotes dringi Hallermann & Böhme, 2000
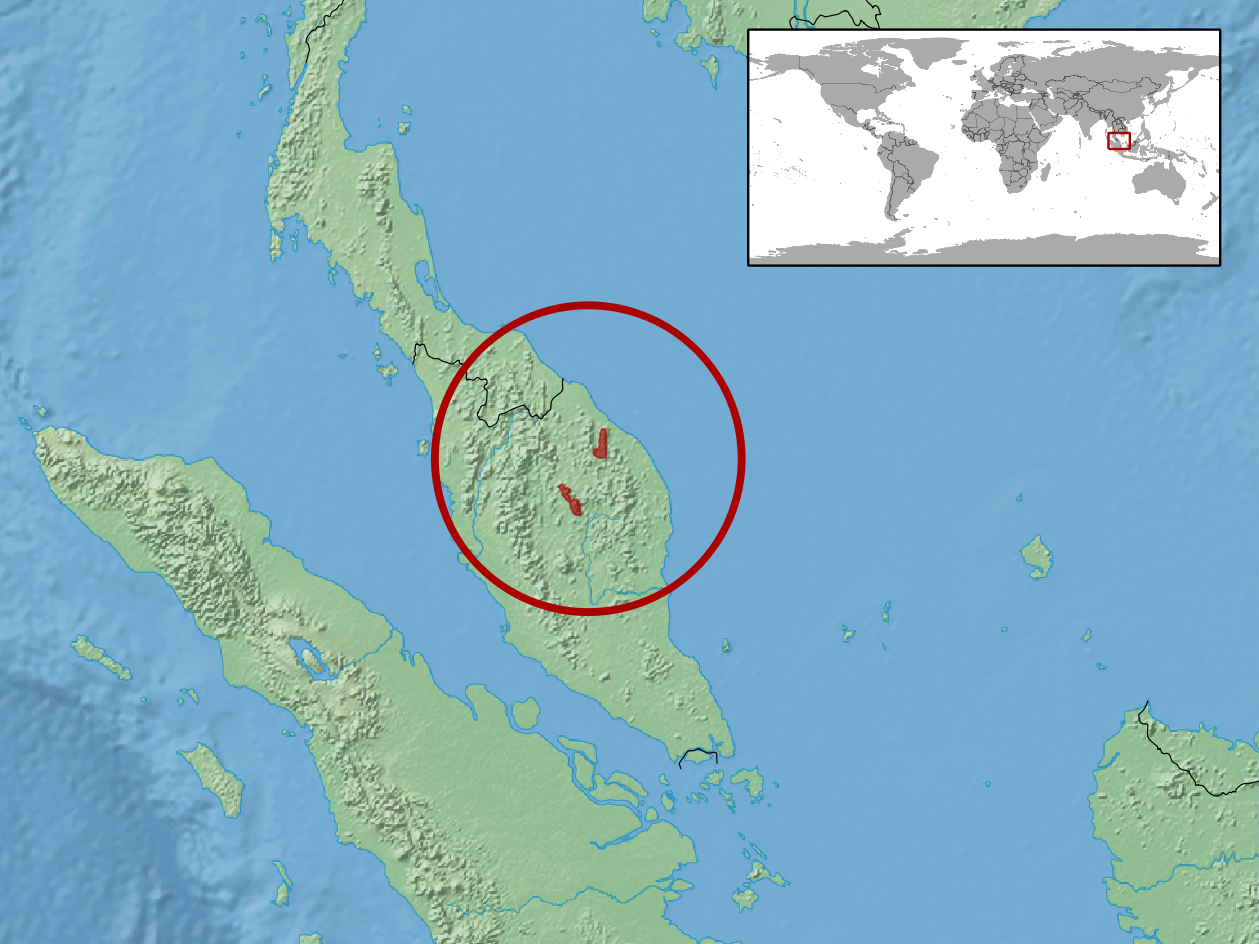

Species of lizard

Pseudocalotes dringi, also known commonly as Dring's false bloodsucker and Dring's false garden lizard, is a species of lizard in the family Agamidae. The species is endemic to Malaysia.

== Etymology ==
The specific name, dringi, is in honor of British herpetologist Julian Christopher Mark Dring.

== Geographic range ==
P. dringi is found in Peninsular Malaysia.

== Habitat ==
The preferred natural habitats of P. dringi are forest and shrubland, at an altitude of 1,500 m (4,920 ft).

== Behavior ==
P. dringi is diurnal and arboreal.

== Reproduction ==
P. dringi is oviparous.
