= Cathetorhinus melanocephalus =

Scientific classification
- Kingdom: Animalia
- Phylum: Chordata
- Class: Reptilia
- Order: Squamata
- Suborder: Serpentes
- Family: Gerrhopilidae
- Genus: Cathetorhinus; Duméril & Bibron, 1844
- Species: C. melanocephalus

Binomial name
- Cathetorhinus melanocephalus Duméril & Bibron, 1844

Synonyms
- Typhlops melanocephalus; Ramphotyphlops melanocephalus

Species of snake

Cathetorhinus melanocephalus is a species of snake in the Gerrhopilidae family. It may belong to the genus Rhinotyphlops, but a formal reassignment has yet to be published.

== Description ==
It is thought that this snake is oviparous. It is thought that this species could occur in Timor, Australia, Mauritius or Tenerife.

== Etymology ==
Its scientific name means "black-headed" in Latin.
