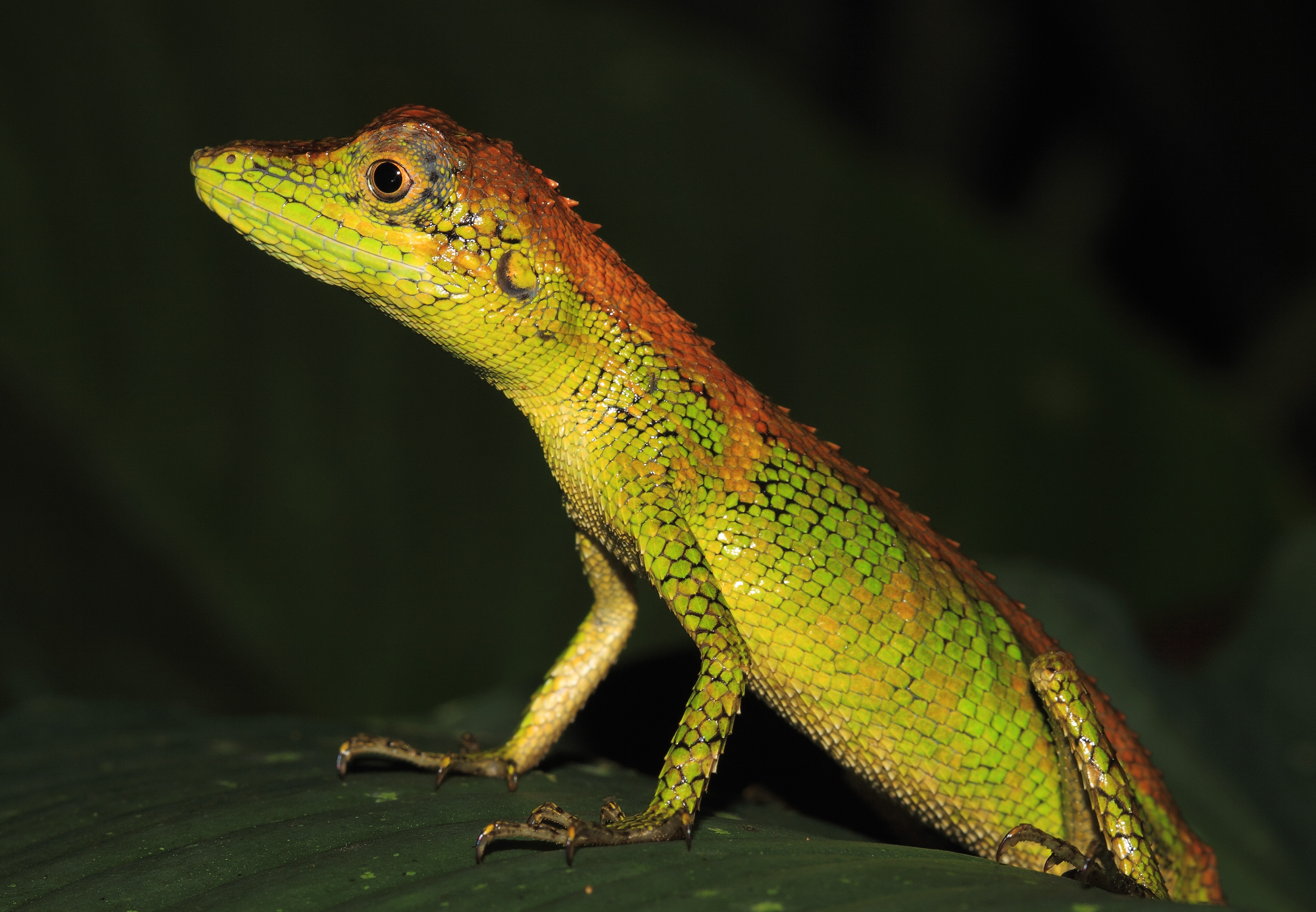

Conservation status
- Least Concern (IUCN 3.1)

Scientific classification
- Kingdom: Animalia
- Phylum: Chordata
- Class: Reptilia
- Order: Squamata
- Suborder: Iguania
- Family: Agamidae
- Genus: Pseudocalotes
- Species: P. tympanistriga

Binomial name
- Pseudocalotes tympanistriga (JE Gray, 1831)

= Pseudocalotes tympanistriga =

Species of lizard

Pseudocalotes tympanistriga, the Indonesian false bloodsucker, is a species of agamid lizard. It is found in Indonesia.
