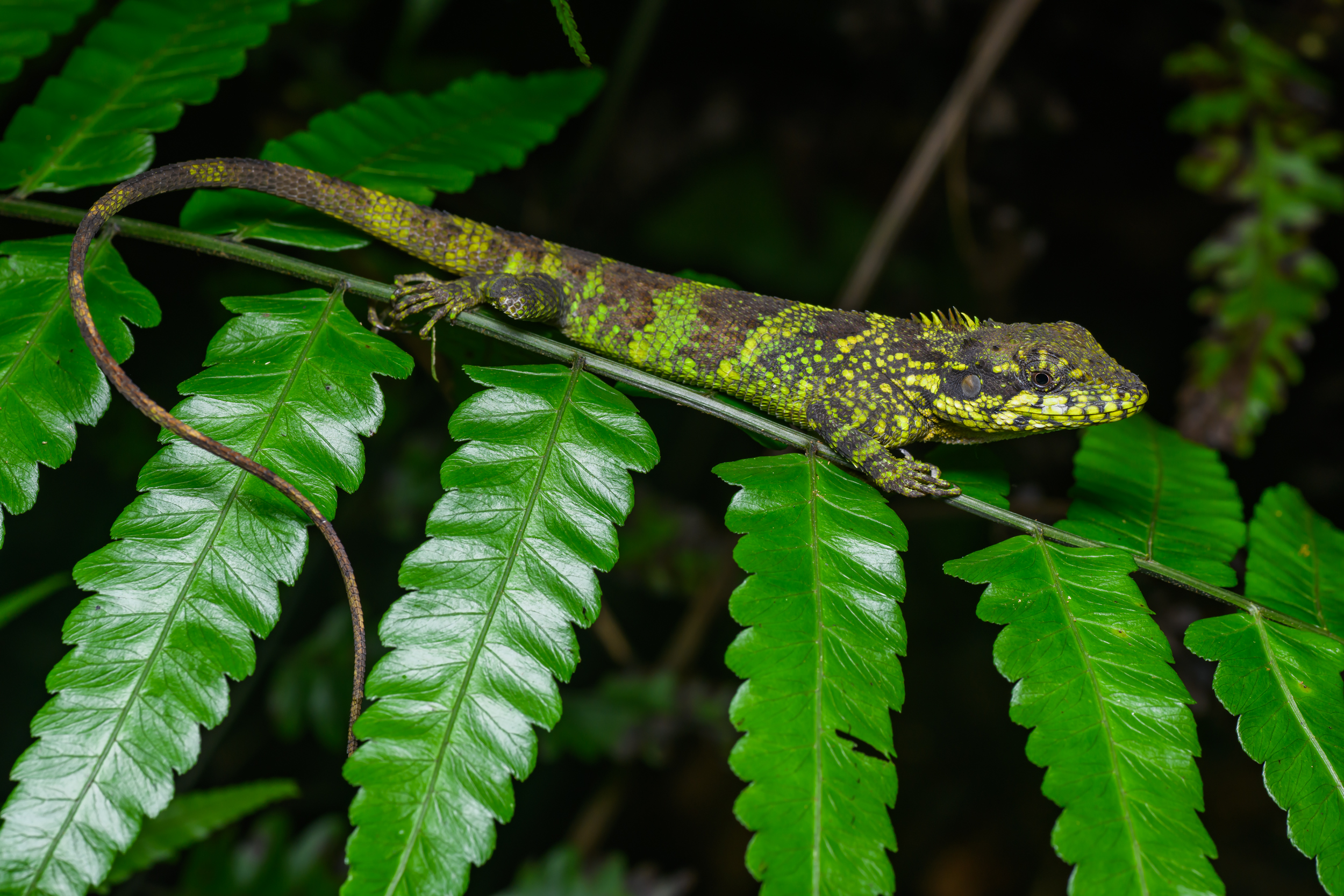

Conservation status
- Least Concern (IUCN 3.1)

Scientific classification
- Kingdom: Animalia
- Phylum: Chordata
- Class: Reptilia
- Order: Squamata
- Suborder: Iguania
- Family: Agamidae
- Genus: Pseudocalotes
- Species: P. kakhienensis

Binomial name
- Pseudocalotes kakhienensis (Anderson, 1879)

Synonyms
- Oriocalotes kakhienensis Anderson, 1879; Salea kakhienensis (Anderson, 1879)

= Pseudocalotes kakhienensis =

Kakhyen Hills spiny lizard

Species of lizard

Pseudocalotes kakhienensis, the Kakhyen Hills spiny lizard or Burmese mountain agamid, is a species of agamid lizard found in southern China (western Yunnan), Myanmar (= Burma) (east of Irrawaddy River), India, and northern Thailand.

The type locality is Ponsee, Western Yunnan.
