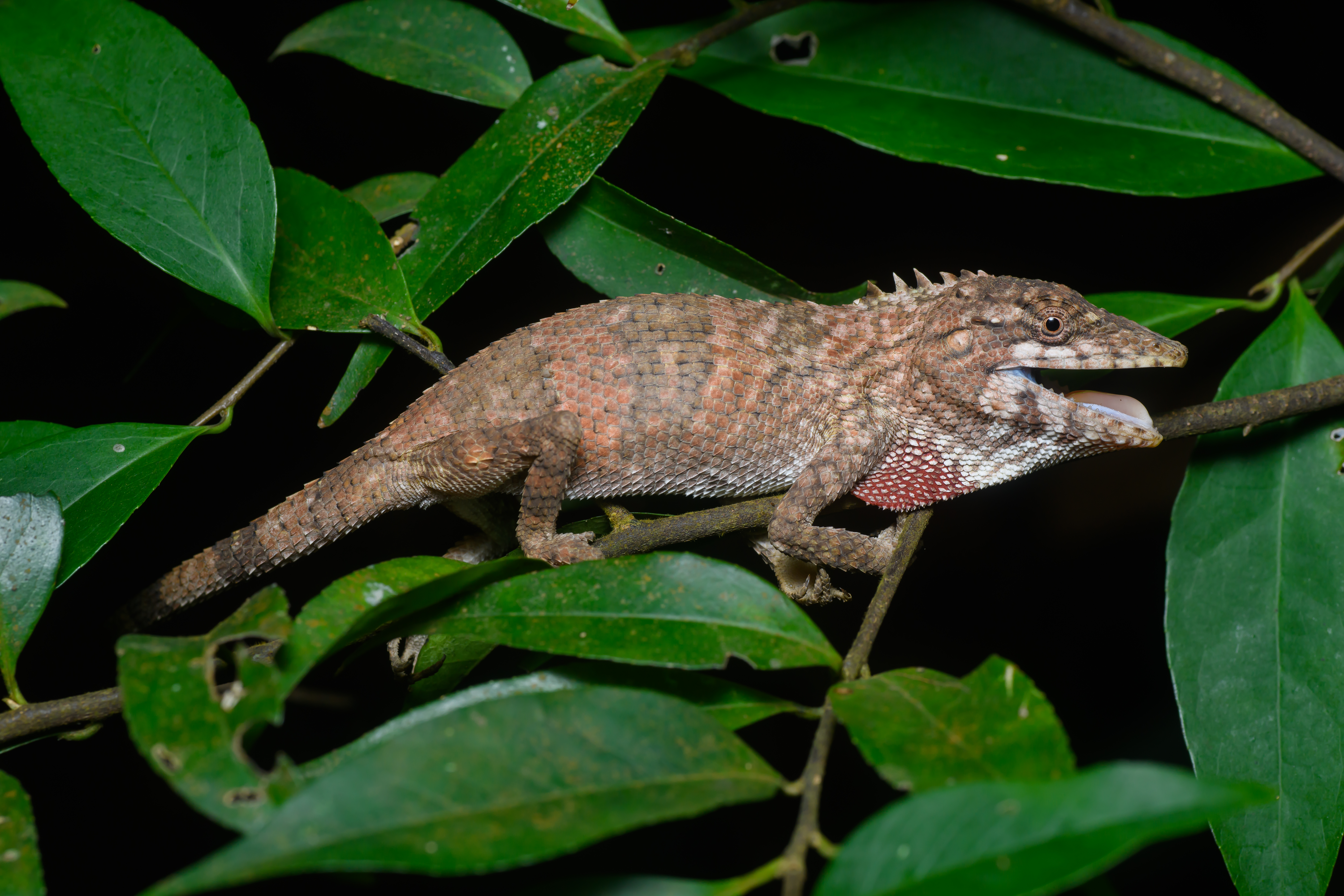
- Pseudocalotes floweri at Khao Khitchakut National Park

Scientific classification
- Kingdom: Animalia
- Phylum: Chordata
- Class: Reptilia
- Order: Squamata
- Suborder: Iguania
- Family: Agamidae
- Subfamily: Draconinae
- Genus: Pseudocalotes; Fitzinger, 1843

Synonyms
- Mictopholis M.A. Smith, 1935

= Pseudocalotes =

Genus of lizards

Pseudocalotes is a genus of lizards in the family Agamidae. The genus is endemic to Southeast Asia.

== Taxonomy and description ==
Pseudocalotes was disassociated from the genus Calotes by Scott Michael Moody in 1980. Pseudocalotes is distinguished from Calotes in having weak limbs, as may be noted in one of the species named brevipes. It is distinguished from the C. versicolor group in having mixed orientation of dorsal scales, and lacking spines on the head. It is distinguished from Bronchocela in lacking a cheek skin fold, and in having short weak limbs. Pseudocalotes species do not have any enlarged compressed set of scales behind the orbit.

== Geographic range ==
Pseudocalotes does not occur west of Sumatra and may occur in the Isthmus of Kra and Myanmar. A specimen was reported from northeastern India in the past though never verified.

== Species of genus Pseudocalotes ==
The Indochinese group

- Pseudocalotes andamanensis (Boulenger, 1891) – Andaman Islands – green crestless forest lizard
- Pseudocalotes bapoensis (Yang, Su & Li, 1979) – China (Yunnan)
- Pseudocalotes brevipes (F. Werner, 1904) – northern Vietnam – Vietnam false bloodsucker
- Pseudocalotes floweri (Boulenger, 1912) – eastern Thailand and Cambodia – Thai false bloodsucker, Flower’s forest agamid
- Pseudocalotes jingpo Xu, Gong, Hou, Weng, Liu, Deng, Hu & Peng, 2024 - Jingpo false garden lizard
- Pseudocalotes kakhienensis (J. Anderson, 1879) – Kakhyen Hills spiny lizard, Burmese mountain agamid
- Pseudocalotes khaonanensis Chan-ard, Cota, Makchai & Laoteaw, 2008 – Nakhon Si Thammarat, peninsular Thailand
- Pseudocalotes kingdonwardi (M.A. Smith, 1935) – Kingdonward's bloodsucker
- Pseudocalotes microlepis (Boulenger, 1888) – northern Tenasserim, Burma, northern and western Thailand, northern Laos, and southern China – Burmese false bloodsucker, small-scaled forest agamid
- Pseudocalotes poilani (Bourret, 1939) – southern Laos – Laotian false bloodsucker
- Pseudocalotes ziegleri Hallermann, T.Q. Nguyen, Orlov & Ananjeva, 2010 – Vietnam – Ziegler’s tree lizard

The Sundaland group

- Pseudocalotes baliomus Harvey et al., 2017 – West Sumatra – spot-shouldered false garden lizard
- Pseudocalotes cybelidermus Harvey et al., 2014 – southern Sumatra – purple-throated false garden lizard
- Pseudocalotes dringi Hallermann & Böhme, 2000 – peninsular Malaysia – Dring’s false garden lizard
- Pseudocalotes drogon L.L. Grismer et al., 2016 – Fraser’s Hill, Pahang – Drogon’s false garden lizard
- Pseudocalotes flavigula (M.A. Smith, 1924) – peninsular Malaysia – Malaya false bloodsucker, yellow-throated forest agamid, yellow-throated false garden lizard
- Pseudocalotes guttalineatus Harvey et al., 2014 – southern Sumatra – dash-lined false garden lizard
- Pseudocalotes larutensis Hallermann & McGuire, 2001 – peninsular Malaysia – Bukit Larut false garden lizard
- Pseudocalotes rhaegal L.L. Grismer et al., 2016 – Cameron Highlands, Pahang – Rhaegal’s false garden lizard
- Pseudocalotes rhammanotus Harvey et al., 2014 – southern Sumatra – stitched-back false garden lizard
- Pseudocalotes saravacensis Inger & Stuebing, 1994 – Sarawak, eastern Malaysia
- Pseudocalotes tympanistriga (Gray, 1831) – lesser tree agama – Java, Indonesia – Indonesian false bloodsucker
- Pseudocalotes viserion L.L. Grismer et al., 2016 – Genting Highlands, Pahang – Viserion’s false garden lizard

Nota bene: A binomial authority in parentheses indicates that the species was originally described in a genus other than Pseudocalotes.
