= Pseudocalotes flavigula =

Conservation status
- Critically Endangered (IUCN 3.1)

Scientific classification
- Kingdom: Animalia
- Phylum: Chordata
- Class: Reptilia
- Order: Squamata
- Suborder: Iguania
- Family: Agamidae
- Genus: Pseudocalotes
- Species: P. flavigula

Binomial name
- Pseudocalotes flavigula (Smith, 1924)

Species of lizard

Pseudocalotes flavigula, the Malaya false bloodsucker, yellow-throated forest agamid, or yellow-throated false garden lizard, is a species of agamid lizard. It is found in Malaysia.
