= Pseudocalotes bapoensis =

Scientific classification
- Domain: Eukaryota
- Kingdom: Animalia
- Phylum: Chordata
- Class: Reptilia
- Order: Squamata
- Suborder: Iguania
- Family: Agamidae
- Genus: Pseudocalotes
- Species: P. bapoensis

Binomial name
- Pseudocalotes bapoensis (Yang, Su, & Li, 1979)

Species of lizard

Pseudocalotes bapoensis is a species of agamid lizard. It is endemic to China.
