= Pseudocalotes drogon =

Conservation status
- Data Deficient (IUCN 3.1)

Scientific classification
- Kingdom: Animalia
- Phylum: Chordata
- Class: Reptilia
- Order: Squamata
- Suborder: Iguania
- Family: Agamidae
- Genus: Pseudocalotes
- Species: P. drogon

Binomial name
- Pseudocalotes drogon Grismer, Quah, Wood, Anuar, Muin, Davis, Murdoch, Grismer, Cota, & Cobos, 2016

Species of lizard

Pseudocalotes drogon, or Drogon's false garden lizard, is a species of agamid lizard.

== Etymology ==
In 2016, three new species of Pseudocalotes were described from the sky islands of the Titiwangsa Mountains in Malaysia. The three species consist of Pseudocalotes drogon, Pseudocalotes viserion, and Pseudocalotes rhaegal. They are named after the three dragons of Daenerys Targaryen from George R. R. Martin's A Song of Ice and Fire, with each species bearing similar colours to their namesake dragon.

== Distribution ==
Pseudocalotes drogon has been found on Fraser's Hill in Pahang, Malaysia.
