= Pseudocalotes khaonanensis =

Conservation status
- Data Deficient (IUCN 3.1)

Scientific classification
- Kingdom: Animalia
- Phylum: Chordata
- Class: Reptilia
- Order: Squamata
- Suborder: Iguania
- Family: Agamidae
- Genus: Pseudocalotes
- Species: P. khaonanensis

Binomial name
- Pseudocalotes khaonanensis Chan-ard, Cota, Makchai, and Lhaotaew, 2008
- Pseudocalotes khaonanensis is only known from Khao Nan National Park in southern Thailand

Species of lizard

Pseudocalotes khaonanensis is a species of agamid lizard. It is the largest species in the genus Pseudocalotes and can reach 105 mm (4.1 in) in snout–vent length. Endemic to Thailand, it is found only in the Tenasserim Hills in Khao Nan National Park, in the Nakhon Si Thammarat province of Southern Thailand. Found at high elevation (above 1,100 m (3,600 ft) a.s.l.) in cloud/montane forests in the stunted tree growth associated with this habitat, in trees rich with epiphyte growth.
