= Larutia nubisilvicola =

Conservation status
- Least Concern (IUCN 3.1)

Scientific classification
- Kingdom: Animalia
- Phylum: Chordata
- Class: Reptilia
- Order: Squamata
- Family: Scincidae
- Genus: Larutia
- Species: L. nubisilvicola

Binomial name
- Larutia nubisilvicola Chan-ard, Cota, Makchai, & Lhaotaew, 2011
- Larutia nubisilvicola is only known from Khao Nan National Park in southern Thailand.

Species of lizard

Larutia nubisilvicola is a species of skink endemic to Southern Thailand. It is only known from its type locality in Khao Nan National Park in the Nakhon Si Thammarat Province. It is named after its habitat, cloud forest at about 1,300 m (4,300 ft) above sea level. It occurs on the forest floor, close to the trunks of the larger trees that it uses as refugia.
