= Gerrhopilus =

Scientific classification
- Kingdom: Animalia
- Phylum: Chordata
- Class: Reptilia
- Order: Squamata
- Suborder: Serpentes
- Family: Gerrhopilidae
- Genus: Gerrhopilus; Fitzinger, 1843

Genus of snakes

Gerrhopilus is a genus of snakes in the family Gerrhopilidae.

== Geographic range ==
The 29 species of the genus Gerrhopilus are found in South Asia, Southeast Asia, and Melanesia.

== Species ==
- Gerrhopilus addisoni Kraus, 2017
- Gerrhopilus andamanensis (Stoliczka, 1871)
- Gerrhopilus ater (Schlegel, 1839)
- Gerrhopilus beddomii (Boulenger, 1890)
- Gerrhopilus bisubocularis (Boettger, 1893)
- Gerrhopilus ceylonicus (M.A. Smith, 1943)
- Gerrhopilus depressiceps (Sternfeld, 1913)
- Gerrhopilus eurydice Kraus, 2017
- Gerrhopilus flavinotatus Kraus, 2023
- Gerrhopilus floweri (Boulenger, 1899)
- Gerrhopilus fredparkeri (Wallach, 1996)
- Gerrhopilus hades (Kraus, 2005)
- Gerrhopilus hedraeus (Savage, 1950)
- Gerrhopilus inornatus (Boulenger, 1888)
- Gerrhopilus lestes Kraus, 2017
- Gerrhopilus lorealis Kraus, 2023
- Gerrhopilus manilae (Taylor, 1919)
- Gerrhopilus mcdowelli (Wallach, 1996)
- Gerrhopilus mirus (Jan, 1860)
- Gerrhopilus oligolepis (Wall, 1909)
- Gerrhopilus papuanorum Kraus, 2023
- Gerrhopilus persephone Kraus, 2017
- Gerrhopilus polyadenus Kraus, 2023
- Gerrhopilus slapcinskyi Kraus, 2023
- Gerrhopilus sumatranus Wynn, 2021
- Gerrhopilus suturalis (Brongersma, 1934)
- Gerrhopilus thurstoni (Boettger, 1890)
- Gerrhopilus tindalli (M.A. Smith, 1943)
- Gerrhopilus wallachi Kraus, 2023

Nota bene: A binomial authority in parentheses indicates that the species was originally described in a genus other than Gerrhopilus.
