= Pseudocalotes viserion =

Conservation status
- Vulnerable (IUCN 3.1)

Scientific classification
- Kingdom: Animalia
- Phylum: Chordata
- Class: Reptilia
- Order: Squamata
- Suborder: Iguania
- Family: Agamidae
- Genus: Pseudocalotes
- Species: P. viserion

Binomial name
- Pseudocalotes viserion Grismer, Quah, Wood, Anuar, Muin, Davis, Murdoch, Grismer, Cota, & Cobos, 2016

Species of lizard

Pseudocalotes viserion, or Viserion's false garden lizard, is a species of agamid lizard found in the Genting Highlands of Pahang, Peninsular Malaysia.

== Etymology ==
In 2016, three new species of Pseudocalotes were described from the sky islands of the Titiwangsa Mountains in Malaysia. The three species consist of Pseudocalotes drogon, Pseudocalotes viserion, and Pseudocalotes rhaegal. They are named after the three dragons of Daenerys Targaryen from George R. R. Martin's A Song of Ice and Fire, with each species bearing similar colours to their namesake dragon.
