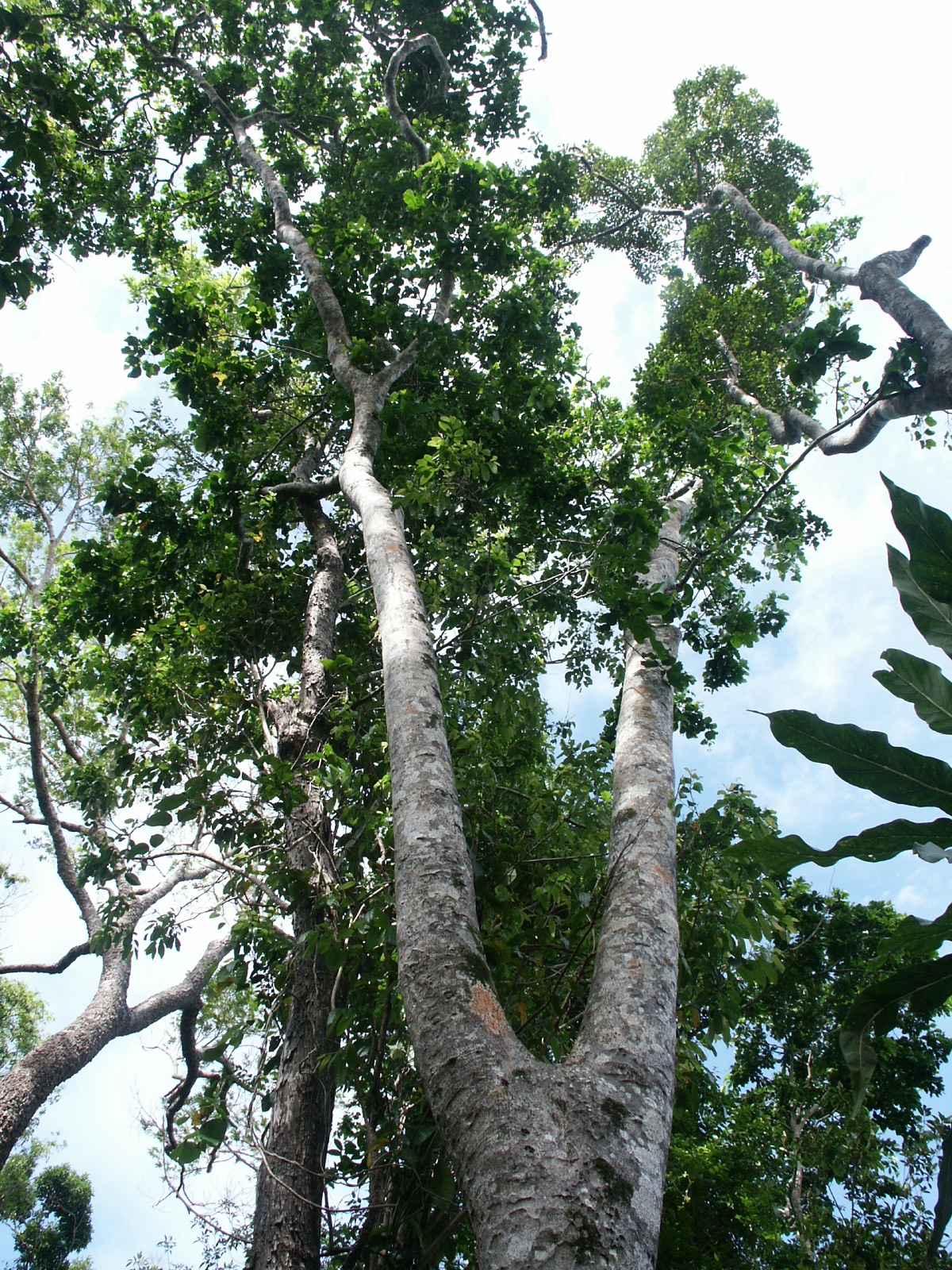

Conservation status
- Near Threatened (IUCN 3.1)

Scientific classification
- Kingdom: Plantae
- Clade: Tracheophytes
- Clade: Angiosperms
- Clade: Eudicots
- Clade: Rosids
- Order: Fabales
- Family: Fabaceae
- Genus: Intsia
- Species: I. bijuga

Binomial name
- Intsia bijuga (Colebr.) Kuntze

Synonyms
- 23 synonyms: for I. bijuga; Afzelia bijuga (Colebr.) A.Gray; Macrolobium bijugum Colebr.; Outea bijuga (Colebr.) DC.; for var. bijuga; Afzelia bijuga f. sambiranensis R.Vig.; Afzelia madagascariensis (DC.) Baill.; Afzelia tashiroi Hayata; Eperua decandra Blanco; Intsia amboinensis DC.; Intsia cuanzensis Kuntze; Intsia madagascariensis DC.; Intsia moelebei Vieill.; Intsia tashiroi Hayata; Jonesia monopetala Hassk.; Jonesia scandens Roxb.; Jonesia triandra Roxb.; Macrolobium amboinense Teijsm. ex Hassk.; Pahudia hasskarliana Miq.; Phanera scandens (Roxb.) Teijsm. & Binn.; Saraca triandra (Roxb.) Baker; Tamarindus intsia Spreng.; Seymeria madagascariensis Kuntze; for var. retusa; Afzelia retusa Kurz; Intsia retusa (Kurz) Kuntze

= Intsia bijuga =

Species of tree in the legume family

Intsia bijuga, commonly known as Borneo teak, ipil, merbau, Johnstone River teak, and kwila, amongst many other names, is a species of tree in the flowering plant family Fabaceae, native to coastal areas from east Africa, through India and Southeast Asia to Australia and the western Pacific. It has significant importance to indigenous cultures in many parts of its range, but is also threatened by illegal logging due to its high quality timber. It is most commonly found in tropical coastal forests.

== Description ==
Intsia bijuga is an evergreen tree that usually grows to about 25–35 m (82–115 ft) tall but may reach 50 m (160 ft), a trunk diameter between 60 and 125 cm (24 and 49 in), and buttresses up to 4 m (13 ft) tall and 2 m (6 ft 7 in) wide. The compound leaves are arranged spirally on the twigs, and usually have four broadly oval-shaped and asymmetrical leaflets, each measuring up to 18 cm (7.1 in) long by 12 cm (4.7 in) wide.

The inflorescences are terminal and carry many bisexual flowers (i.e. flowers that have both male and female parts). Only one petal is fully developed and is up to 3 cm (1.2 in) long; it is initially white and turns pink or red with age. The fruit is a rather flat woody pod measuring between 10–28 cm (3.9–11.0 in) long and 4–8 cm (1.6–3.1 in) broad, with up to 8 disc-shaped seeds about 3 cm (1.2 in) diameter and 1 cm (0.39 in) thick.

=== Phenology ===
In Australia, flowering occurs from December to May.

== Taxonomy ==
The species was first described as Macrolobium bijugum by English botanist Henry Thomas Colebrooke in 1819, and was transferred to the genus Intsia by German botanist Carl Ernst Otto Kuntze in 1891.

=== Infraspecies ===
Two varieties are recognised, I. bijuga var. bijuga and I. bijuga var. retusa

=== Etymology ===
The derivation of the genus name Intsia is uncertain, but it has been suggested it may come from the Malayalam name for Acacia intsia. The species epithet bijuga is from the Latin words bi (two) and jugus (paired), and is a reference to the two pairs of leaflets in the compound leaf.

=== Vernacular names ===
Due to the wide distribution of this species, spanning many different language and cultural areas, many common names exist. They include Borneo teak, intsia, Johnstone River teak, Moluccan ironwood, Pacific teak, scrub mahogany and teak in English; and natora, bendora, ifit, ipil, kayu besi, kwila, melila, merbau asam, merbau ayer, merbau ipil, tashiro-mame, and vesi in other languages across its range.

== Distribution and habitat ==
The natural range of Intsia bijuga is, in broad terms, the Indo-Pacific region. It is native to Tanzania in Africa; the Chagos Archipelago, Madagascar, Mauritius and the Seychelles in the western Indian Ocean; Bangladesh, India and Sri Lanka in the Indian subcontinent; Andaman Islands, Cambodia, Myanmar, Nicobar Islands, Thailand and Vietnam in Indo-China; Taiwan in the South China Sea; Borneo, Java, Malaysia, Maluku, the Philippines, Sulawesi and Sumatra in Malesia; the Bismarck Archipelago, New Guinea and the Solomon Islands in Papuasia; the Northern Territory and Queensland in Australia; and the Caroline Islands, Fiji, the Marianas, the Marshall Islands, New Caledonia, Palau, Samoa, Santa Cruz Islands, Tonga and Vanuatu in the western Pacific Ocean.

The species is mostly coastal and inhabits beach forest and the upper reaches of mangrove forest, but it can also be found in rainforest and may even occur up to 600 m (2,000 ft) altitude.

== Uses ==
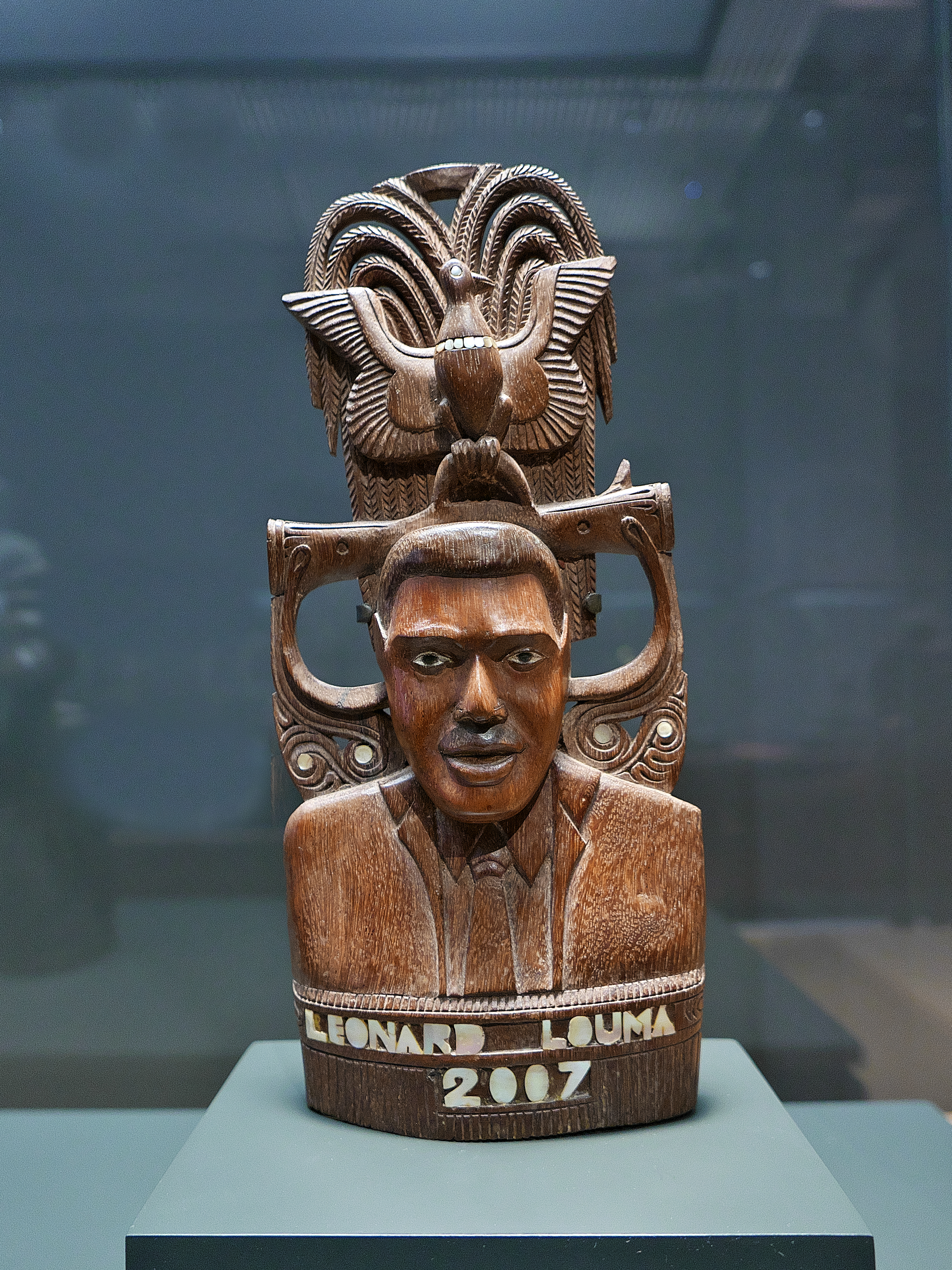
Carving from kwila timber

The timber of this species is often used due to its durablity and termite resistance compared to other types of wood, making it suitable in engineering and construction contexts as well as decorative work. It has a density of 830 kg/m^{3} (1,400 lb/cu yd) and an above-ground life expectancy of more than 40 years.

The tree had many uses in the indigenous communities where the tree is found—the timber was used for house building and for the construction of canoes and rafts, and for the carving of ornaments and tools. A dye can be extracted from the wood, and an insect repellent can be made from the seeds. Decoctions from various parts of the tree have been used to treat a range of ailments such as diarrhoea, rheumatism, pain, colds and influenza.

== Conservation ==
As of October 2024, Intsia bijuga was classified on a worldwide scale as near threatened by the International Union for Conservation of Nature (IUCN); however, various regional authorities have given it different ratings. For example, in Queensland, Australia, it has been given least concern status, whereas in the neighbouring Northern Territory it is listed as critically endangered. It is also listed as critically endangered in Singapore, but as vulnerable in India.

=== Illegal logging ===
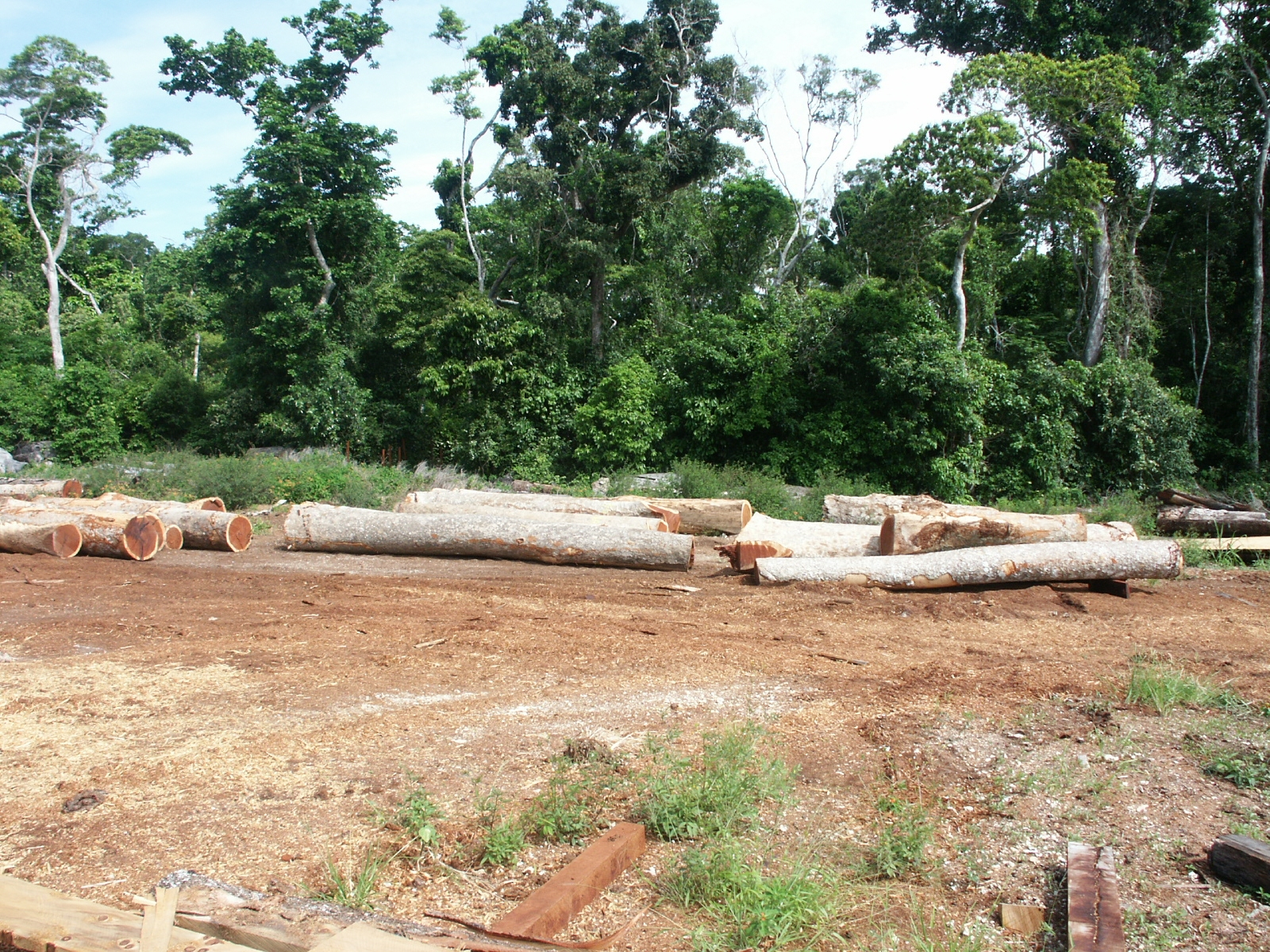
Felled kwila logs in New Guinea

It is believed that the species now exists in large numbers only on the island of New Guinea, and that illegal logging is being carried out there as well as in Indonesia and Malaysia. In 2007, Greenpeace accused China of importing large amounts of illegally-felled ipil logs from New Guinea, and claimed at the time that at the current rate of logging "the species will be virtually wiped out in the next 35 years".

Greenpeace has targeted users in Western countries in order to halt the trade in ipil. In New Zealand, attempts have been made to stop it from being imported. In 2008, retailers were divided as to whether the sale of the timber should be banned. Jim Anderton, who was the Minister in charge of the Ministry of Agriculture and Forestry at that time, did not support a ban and instead left it up to consumer choice.

As of 2022, illegal harvesting of the trees was still going on in New Guinea.

== Culture ==
Intsia bijuga is the official tree of the United States territory of Guam and is a culturally important tree throughout the rest of the Marianas. The Tivia clan of Suburam village on the north coast of Papua New Guinea believes that the timber has spiritual powers, and the tree is sacred to Fijian people.

== Gallery ==
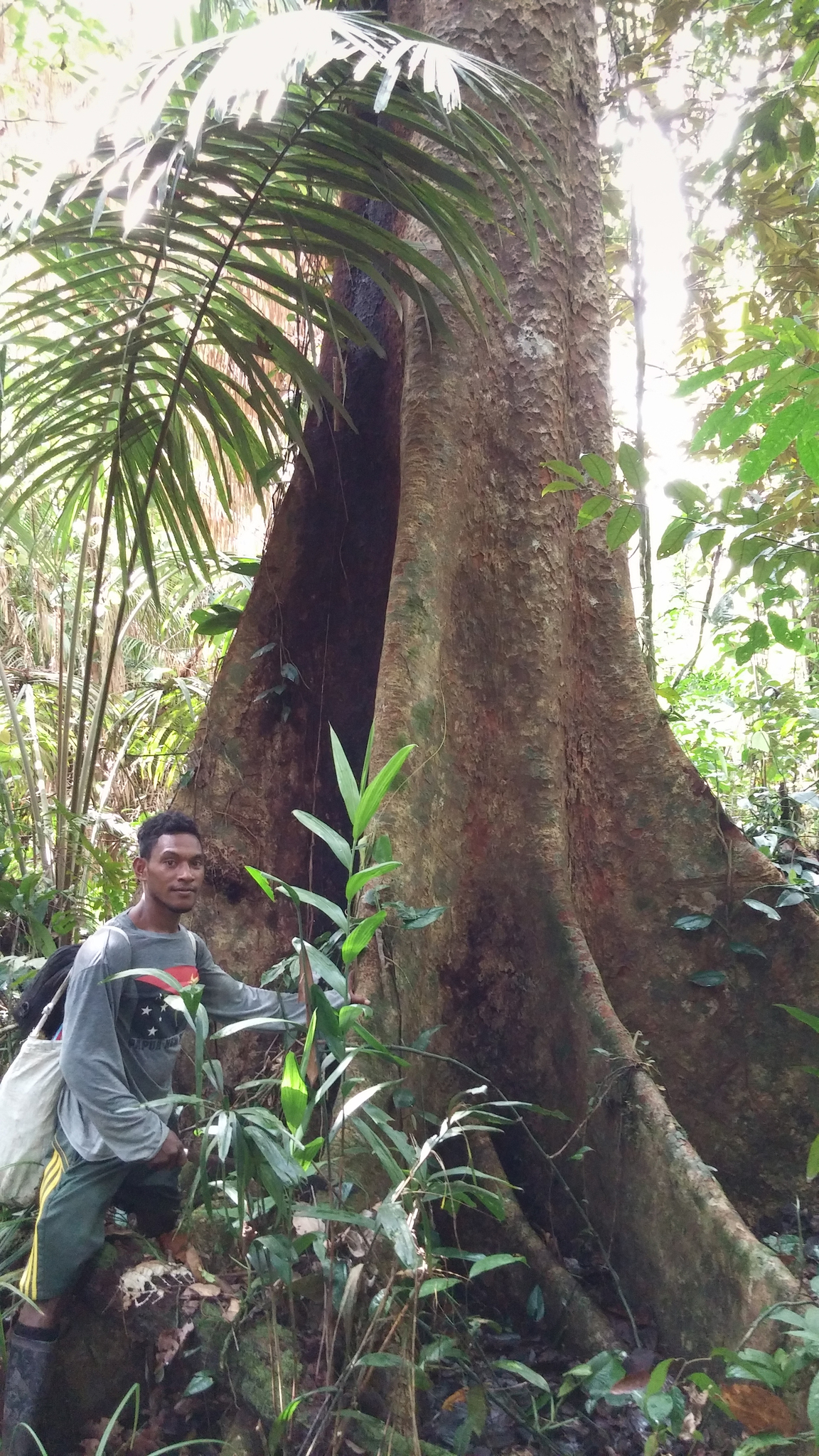
Trunk with buttresses

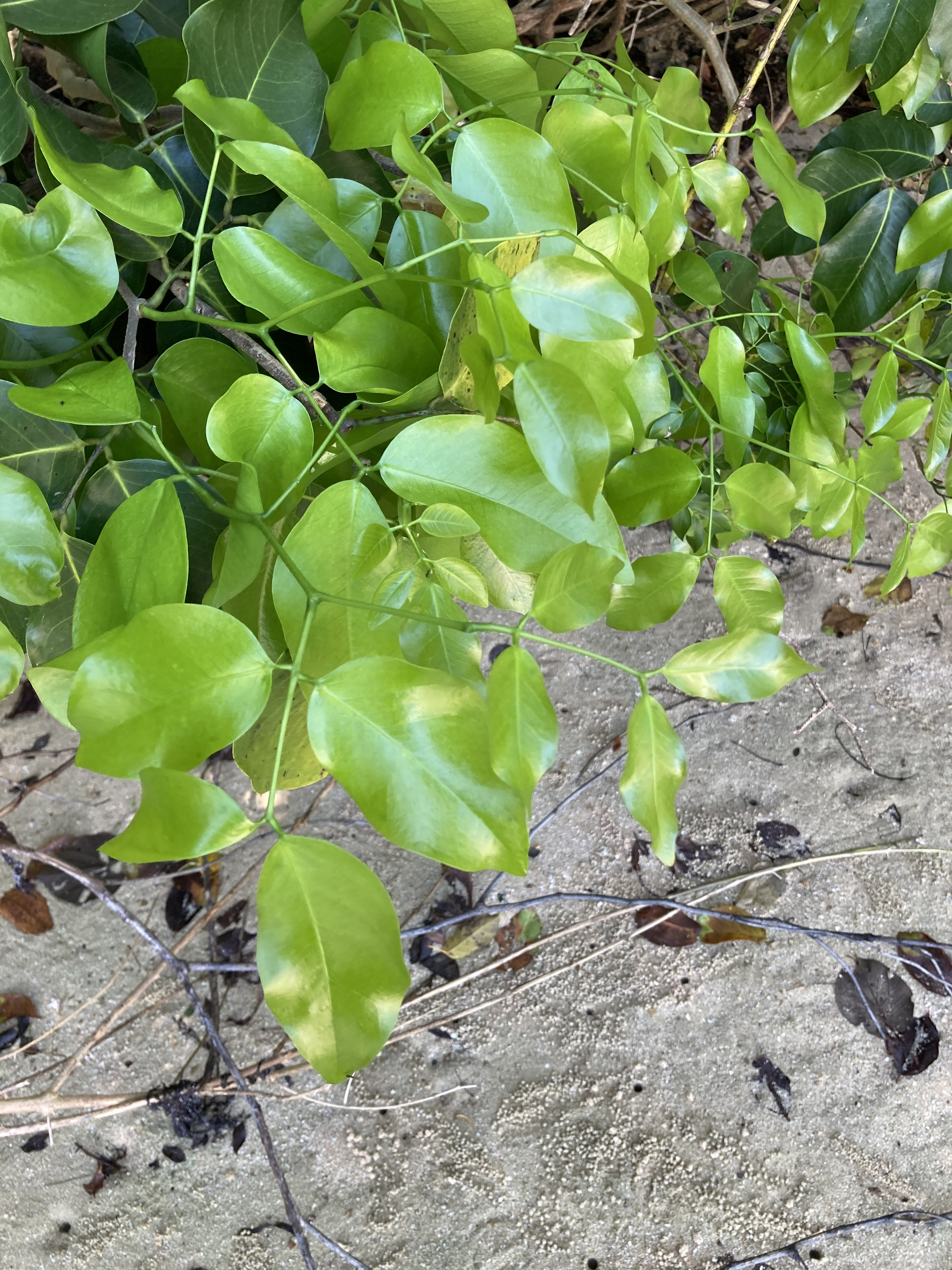
Foliage

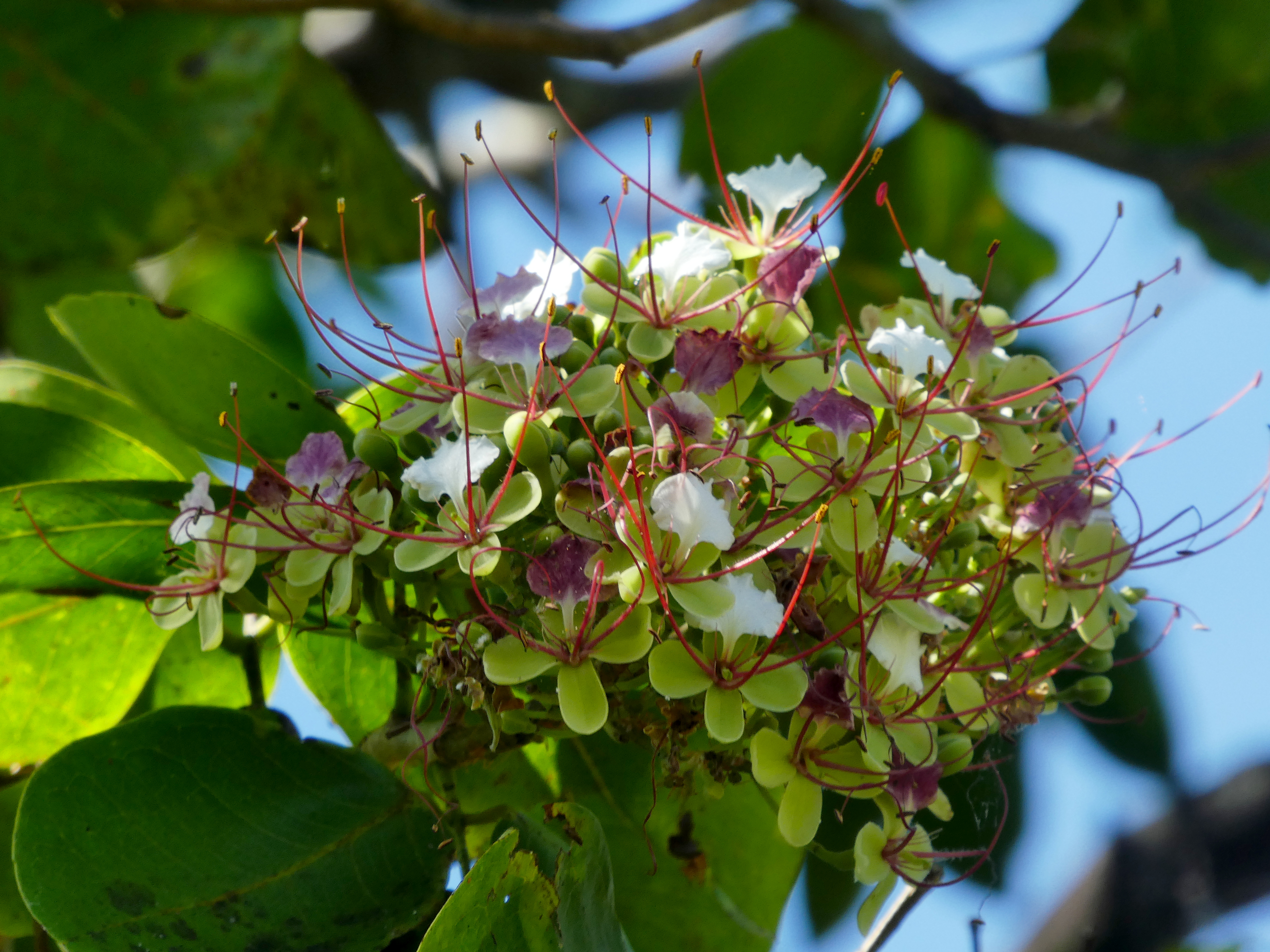
Flowers

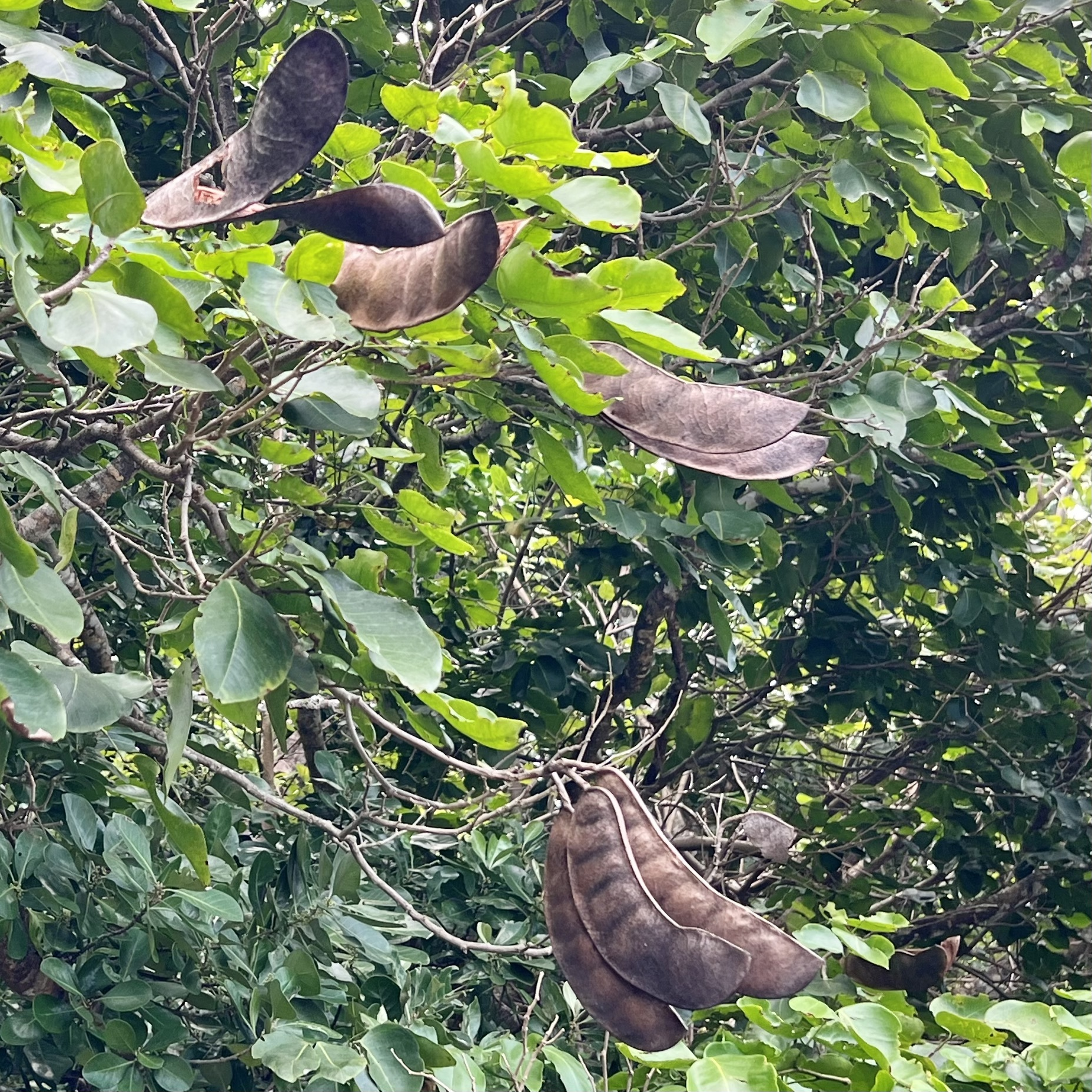
Mature fruit

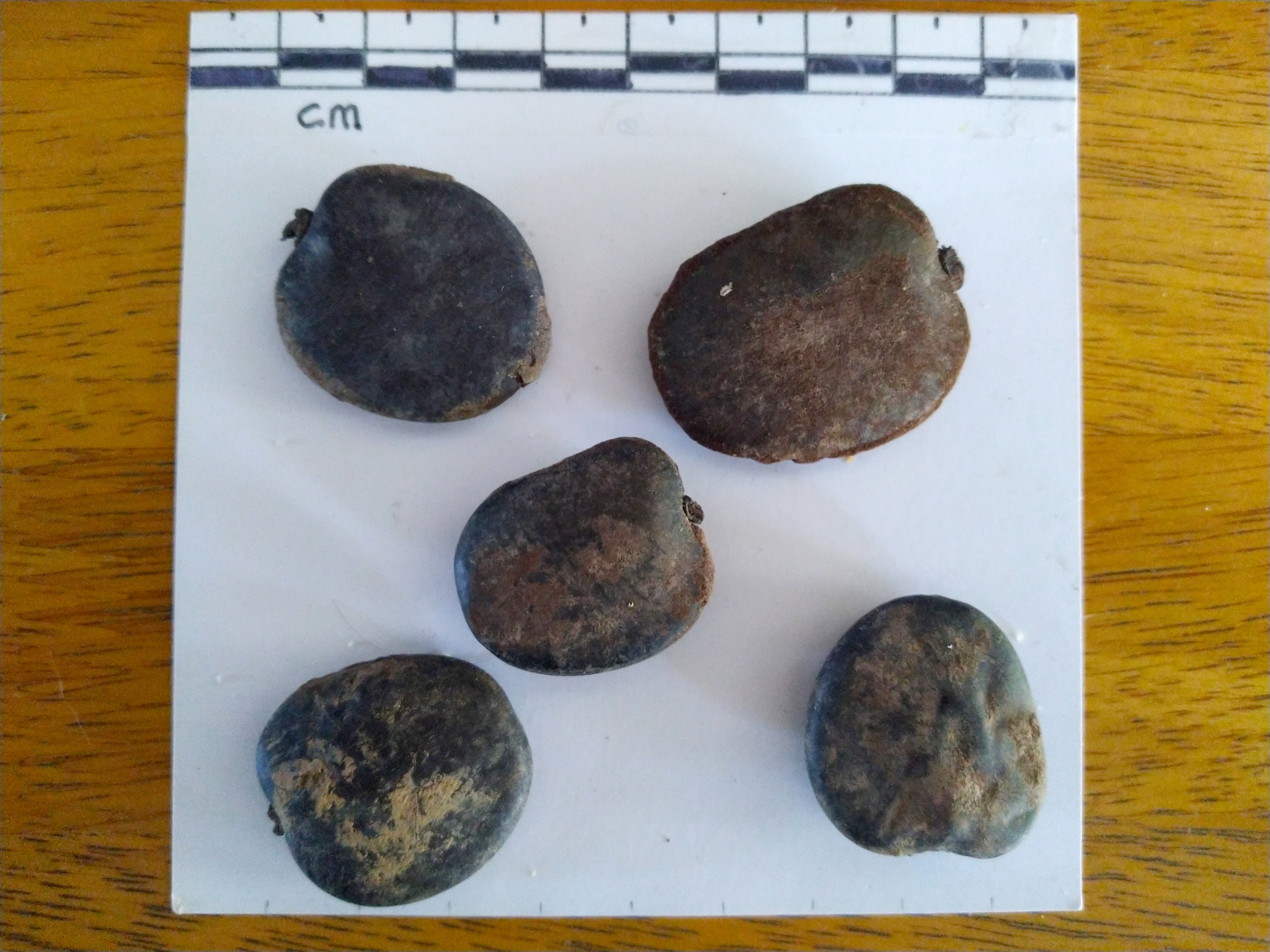
Seeds
