= Gerrhopilidae =

Scientific classification
- Kingdom: Animalia
- Phylum: Chordata
- Class: Reptilia
- Order: Squamata
- Suborder: Serpentes
- Superfamily: Typhlopoidea
- Family: Gerrhopilidae; Vidal, Wynn, Donnellan & Hedges, 2010

Genera
- Gerrhopilus; Cathetorhinus

Family of snakes

The Gerrhopilidae (Indo-Malayan blindsnakes) are a family of blindsnakes that contains at least 16 species in the genus Gerrhopilus, and possibly others (the genus Cathetorhinus and the species known as either Malayotyphlops manilae, Gerrhopilus manilae, or Typhlops manilae) as well. These blindsnakes are found in India (including the Andaman Islands), Sri Lanka, Nepal, Thailand, the Philippines, Indonesia (including Java, Ternate, Sulawesi, Halmahera, Waigeu, Salawati, Irian Jaya, and Bali), and Papua New Guinea.

These blindsnakes were considered to be part of the family Typhlopidae and were formerly known as the Typhlops ater species group. In 2010, they were discovered to be distantly related to other typhlopids and separated into their own family. Gerrhopilidae, Xenotyphlopidae, and Typhlopidae are grouped together in the superfamily Typhlopoidea to emphasize their closer relationship to one another than to the other two families of scolecophidians (Leptotyphlopidae and Anomalepididae).

The Gerrhopilidae are thought to have originated on Insular India during the Cretaceous, shortly after its separation from Madagascar. They later colonized other regions of tropical Asia following India's collision with mainland Asia during the Cenozoic.

Gerrhopilids differ from other blindsnakes in having gland-like structures ‘peppered’ over the head scales. Many species also have a divided preocular and/or ocular scale, and the second supralabialal scale overlaps the preocular in all species but one (G. tindalli).

Recent studies have shown that there are many undiscovered species of blindsnakes, so it is likely that there are many more species of gerrhopilids yet to be discovered.
