= Lenya banded bent-toed gecko =

Scientific classification
- Kingdom: Animalia
- Phylum: Chordata
- Class: Reptilia
- Order: Squamata
- Suborder: Gekkota
- Family: Gekkonidae
- Genus: Cyrtodactylus
- Species: C. lenya

Binomial name
- Cyrtodactylus lenya Mulcahy, Thura, & Zug, 2017

Species of lizard

The Lenya banded bent-toed gecko (Cyrtodactylus lenya) is a species of gecko that is endemic to Myanmar.
