= Huynh's bent-toed gecko =

Conservation status
- Vulnerable (IUCN 3.1)

Scientific classification
- Kingdom: Animalia
- Phylum: Chordata
- Class: Reptilia
- Order: Squamata
- Suborder: Gekkota
- Family: Gekkonidae
- Genus: Cyrtodactylus
- Species: C. huynhi

Binomial name
- Cyrtodactylus huynhi Ngo & Bauer, 2008

Species of lizard endemic to Vietnam

Huynh's bent-toed gecko (Cyrtodactylus huynhi), also known commonly as Huynh's bow-fingered gecko, is a species of lizard in the family Gekkonidae. The species is endemic to Vietnam.

== Etymology ==
The specific name, huynhi, is in honor of Vietnamese biologist Dang Huy Huynh.

== Geographic range ==
C. huynhi is found in southern Vietnam. The type locality is Chua Chan Mountain, Dong Nai Province.

== Habitat ==
The preferred natural habitats of C. huynhi are forest and dry caves, at altitudes of 70–300 m (230–980 ft).

== Reproduction ==
C. huynhi is oviparous.
