= Cyrtodactylus rukhadeva =

Scientific classification
- Kingdom: Animalia
- Phylum: Chordata
- Class: Reptilia
- Order: Squamata
- Suborder: Gekkota
- Family: Gekkonidae
- Genus: Cyrtodactylus
- Species: C. rukhadeva

Binomial name
- Cyrtodactylus rukhadeva Grismer, Suwannapoom, Pawangkhanant, Nazarov, Yushchenko, Naiduangchan, Le, Luu, & Poyarkov, 2021

Species of lizard

Cyrtodactylus rukhadeva is a species of gecko, a lizard in the family Gekkonidae. The species is endemic to Thailand.
