= Grismer's bent-toed gecko =

Conservation status
- Vulnerable (IUCN 3.1)

Scientific classification
- Kingdom: Animalia
- Phylum: Chordata
- Class: Reptilia
- Order: Squamata
- Suborder: Gekkota
- Family: Gekkonidae
- Genus: Cyrtodactylus
- Species: C. grismeri

Binomial name
- Cyrtodactylus grismeri Ngo, 2008

Species of lizard

Grismer's bent-toed gecko (Cyrtodactylus grismeri) is a species of lizard in the family Gekkonidae. The species is endemic to southwestern Vietnam.

== Etymology ==
The specific name, grismeri, is in honor of American herpetologist Larry Lee Grismer.

== Habitat ==
The preferred natural habitat of C. grismeri is caves in forest, at altitudes around 100 m (330 ft).

== Description ==
C. grismeri is reddish brown, and has an average snout-to-vent length (SVL) of 88 mm (3.5 in).

== Behavior ==
C. grismeri is terrestrial, nocturnal, and saxicolous.

== Reproduction ==
C. grismeri is oviparous.
