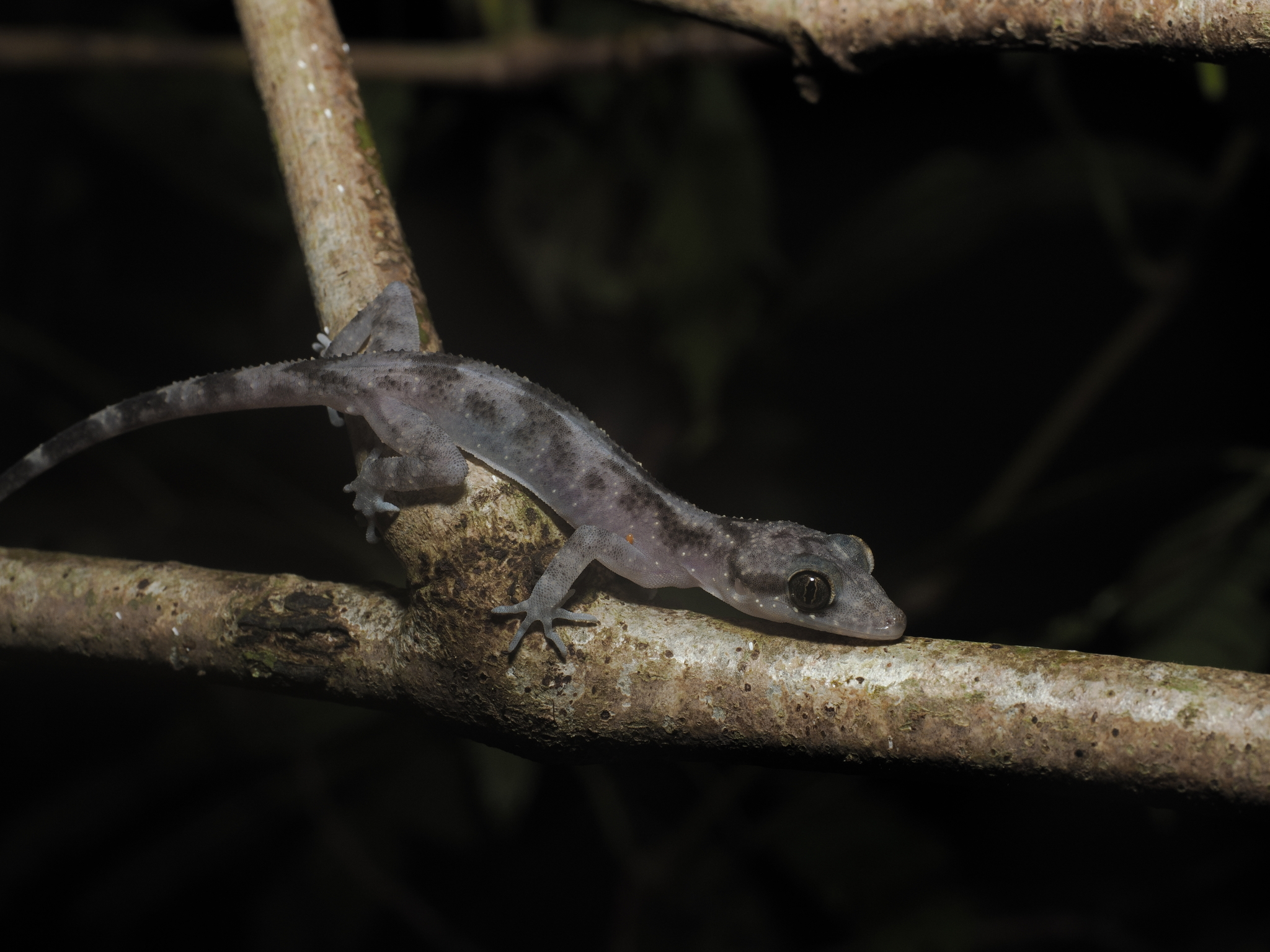

Conservation status
- Least Concern (IUCN 3.1)

Scientific classification
- Kingdom: Animalia
- Phylum: Chordata
- Class: Reptilia
- Order: Squamata
- Suborder: Gekkota
- Family: Gekkonidae
- Genus: Cyrtodactylus
- Species: C. jellesmae

Binomial name
- Cyrtodactylus jellesmae (Boulenger, 1897)

Synonyms
- Gymnodactylus jellesmae Boulenger, 1897; Cyrtodactylus jellesmae — Kramer, 1979

= Kabaena bow-fingered gecko =

Species of lizard

The Kabaena bow-fingered gecko (Cyrtodactylus jellesmae) is a species of gecko, a lizard in the family Gekkonidae. The species is endemic to Indonesia.

== Etymology ==
The specific name, jellesmae, is in honor of Dutch botanist Eeltje Jelles Jellesma (1851–1918).

== Geographic range ==
In Indonesia C. jellesmae is found on the island of Sulawesi.

The type locality is restricted to Masarang, Sulawesi, Indonesia.

== Habitat ==
The preferred natural habitat of C. jellesmae is forest, but it has also been found in cacao plantations.

== Reproduction ==
C. jellesmae is oviparous.
