= Cyrtodactylus cryptus =

Scientific classification
- Kingdom: Animalia
- Phylum: Chordata
- Class: Reptilia
- Order: Squamata
- Suborder: Gekkota
- Family: Gekkonidae
- Genus: Cyrtodactylus
- Species: C. cryptus

Binomial name
- Cyrtodactylus cryptus Heidrich, Rösler, Thanh, Bohme, & Ziegler, 2007

Species of lizard

Cyrtodactylus cryptus is a species of gecko that is found in Vietnam and Laos.
