= Agam bow-fingered gecko =

Conservation status
- Least Concern (IUCN 3.1)

Scientific classification
- Kingdom: Animalia
- Phylum: Chordata
- Class: Reptilia
- Order: Squamata
- Suborder: Gekkota
- Family: Gekkonidae
- Genus: Cyrtodactylus
- Species: C. agamensis

Binomial name
- Cyrtodactylus agamensis (Bleekeer, 1860)

Synonyms
- Gymnodactylus agamensis

Species of lizard

The Agam bow-fingered gecko (Cyrtodactylus agamensis) is a species of gecko endemic to Sumatra. Rösler et al. (2007) revalidated this species, but is of doubtful origin, since their diagnosis was based on a single female.
