= Cyrtodactylus tuberculatus =

Scientific classification
- Kingdom: Animalia
- Phylum: Chordata
- Class: Reptilia
- Order: Squamata
- Suborder: Gekkota
- Family: Gekkonidae
- Genus: Cyrtodactylus
- Species: C. tuberculatus

Binomial name
- Cyrtodactylus tuberculatus (Lucas & Frost, 1900)

Synonyms
- Hoplodactylus tuberculatus; Gymnodactylus olivii; Quantasia tuberculata

Species of lizard

Cyrtodactylus tuberculatus is a species of gecko that is endemic to Queensland in Australia.
