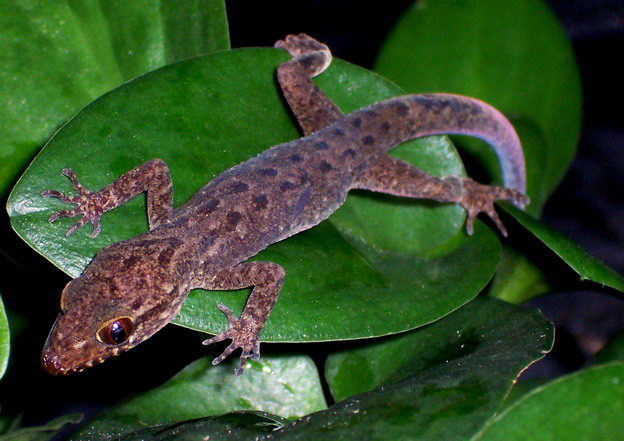
- Cyrtodactylus fumosus

Scientific classification
- Domain: Eukaryota
- Kingdom: Animalia
- Phylum: Chordata
- Class: Reptilia
- Order: Squamata
- Infraorder: Gekkota
- Family: Gekkonidae
- Genus: Cyrtodactylus
- Species: C. fumosus

Binomial name
- Cyrtodactylus fumosus (Müller, 1895)

Synonyms
- Gymnodactylus fumosus

= Cyrtodactylus fumosus =

Species of lizard

Cyrtodactylus fumosus is a species of gecko that is endemic to Sulawesi in Indonesia.
