= Cyrtodactylus raglai =

Scientific classification
- Kingdom: Animalia
- Phylum: Chordata
- Class: Reptilia
- Order: Squamata
- Suborder: Gekkota
- Family: Gekkonidae
- Genus: Cyrtodactylus
- Species: C. raglai

Binomial name
- Cyrtodactylus raglai Nguyen, Duong, Grismer, & Poyarkov, 2021

Species of lizard

Cyrtodactylus raglai, the Ragla bent-toed gecko, is a species of gecko that is endemic to Vietnam.
