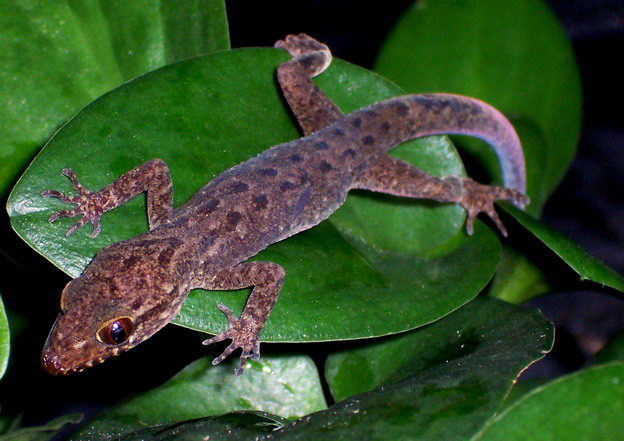
- from Bogor, West Java, Indonesia.

Scientific classification
- Kingdom: Animalia
- Phylum: Chordata
- Class: Reptilia
- Order: Squamata
- Suborder: Gekkota
- Family: Gekkonidae
- Genus: Cyrtodactylus
- Species: C. marmoratus

Binomial name
- Cyrtodactylus marmoratus Gray, 1831

Synonyms
- Gymnodactylus marmoratus; Gonyodactylus marmoratus

= Marbled bow-fingered gecko =

Species of lizard

The marbled bow-fingered gecko (Cyrtodactylus marmoratus) is a species of gecko found in Southeast Asia.

== Description ==
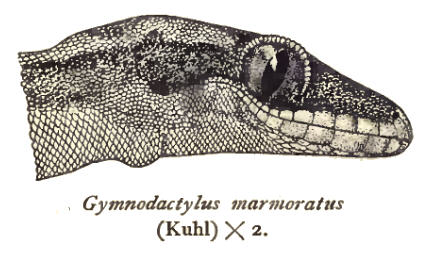

Head large, depressed; snout pointed, longer than the diameter of the orbit, which equals its distance from the ear-opening; forehead concave; ear-opening oval, oblique, about one third the diameter of the eye. Head granular, with small tubercles on the occiput and temples; the granules enlarged on the snout. Rostral subquadrangular, about twice as broad as high, with median cleft above; nostril bordered by the rostral, the first labial and 4 or 5 scales. Twelve upper and ten lower labials; mental triangular; two or three pair of chin-shields, median largest and in contact behind the mental. Throat with very small granules- Body elongate, covered above with small granules, intermixed with small, round, feebly keeled, subtrihedral tubercles. Lateral fold, sometimes very indistinct, with a few, slightly enlarged tubercles. Ventral scales small, smooth, cycloid, imbricate, 40—45 across the middle of the belly. Male with 12 or 13 preanal pores in an angular series, an inverted-V-shaped, in a longitudinal groove, and 4—6 femoral pores, separated from the former, on each thigh. Tail round, tapering, covered with uniform small, flat scales and rows of 4—6 keeled, trihedral tubercles at the base. Limbs elongate; digits strong, slightly depressed at the base, which has enlarged transverse plates inferiorly, compressed in the distal part. Light brown above, with spots of dark brown along the back, sometimes forming cross bands. Head with irregular dark markings; a dark temporal streak. Tail with dark brown annuli. Lower surface yellowish-white, each scale punctulated with dark brown. Length of head and body 76 mm.; tail 72 mm.

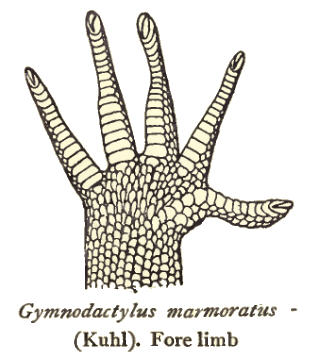

== Distribution ==
It is found in Thailand, the Malay Peninsula, Indonesian (Java, Sulawesi, Halmahera), and Papua New Guinea. Type locality: Java.
