= Cyrtodactylus huongsonensis =

Scientific classification
- Kingdom: Animalia
- Phylum: Chordata
- Class: Reptilia
- Order: Squamata
- Suborder: Gekkota
- Family: Gekkonidae
- Genus: Cyrtodactylus
- Species: C. huongsonensis

Binomial name
- Cyrtodactylus huongsonensis Luu, Nguyen, Do & Ziegler, 2011

Gecko endemic to Vietnam

Cyrtodactylus huongsonensis is a species of gecko that is endemic to Vietnam.
