= Bobrov's bent-toed gecko =

Conservation status
- Least Concern (IUCN 3.1)

Scientific classification
- Kingdom: Animalia
- Phylum: Chordata
- Class: Reptilia
- Order: Squamata
- Suborder: Gekkota
- Family: Gekkonidae
- Genus: Cyrtodactylus
- Species: C. bobrovi

Binomial name
- Cyrtodactylus bobrovi T.Q. Nguyen, Le, A. Pham, H. Ngo, Hoang, C. Pham & Ziegler, 2015

Species of lizard

Bobrov's bent-toed gecko (Cyrtodactylus bobrovi) is a species of lizard in the family Gekkonidae. The species is endemic to Vietnam.

== Etymology ==
The specific name, bobrovi is in honor of Russian herpetologist Vladimir V. Bobrov.

== Geographic range ==
C. bobrovi is found in northwestern Vietnam, in Hoa Binh Province.

== Habitat ==
The preferred natural habitats of C. bobrovi are forest, rocky areas, and dry caves, at altitudes of 195–618 m (640–2,028 ft).

== Description ==
Medium-sized for its genus, C. bobrovi may attain a snout-to-vent length (SVL) of 9.5 cm (3.7 in).
