= Cyrtodactylus dianxiensis =

Scientific classification
- Kingdom: Animalia
- Phylum: Chordata
- Class: Reptilia
- Order: Squamata
- Suborder: Gekkota
- Family: Gekkonidae
- Genus: Cyrtodactylus
- Species: C. dianxiensis

Binomial name
- Cyrtodactylus dianxiensis Liu & Rao, 2021

Species of lizard

Cyrtodactylus dianxiensis, the western Yunnan bent-toed gecko, is a species of gecko endemic to China.
