= Cyrtodactylus variegatus =

Conservation status
- Data Deficient (IUCN 3.1)

Scientific classification
- Kingdom: Animalia
- Phylum: Chordata
- Class: Reptilia
- Order: Squamata
- Suborder: Gekkota
- Family: Gekkonidae
- Genus: Cyrtodactylus
- Species: C. variegatus

Binomial name
- Cyrtodactylus variegatus (Blyth, 1859)

Synonyms
- Naultinus variegatus; Gymnodactylus variegatus

Species of lizard

Cyrtodactylus variegatus, also known as the variegated bow-fingered gecko or Moulmein forest gecko, is a species of gecko that is found in Myanmar and Thailand. However, it is uncertain whether any records from Thailand actually belong to this species.
