= Speckle-faced bent-toed gecko =

Scientific classification
- Kingdom: Animalia
- Phylum: Chordata
- Class: Reptilia
- Order: Squamata
- Suborder: Gekkota
- Family: Gekkonidae
- Genus: Cyrtodactylus
- Species: C. psarops

Binomial name
- Cyrtodactylus psarops Harvey, O'Connell, Barraza, Riyanto, Kurniawan, & Smith, 2015

Species of lizard

The speckle-faced bent-toed gecko (Cyrtodactylus psarops) is a species of gecko that is endemic to southern Sumatra.
