= Cyrtodactylus tahuna =

Scientific classification
- Kingdom: Animalia
- Phylum: Chordata
- Class: Reptilia
- Order: Squamata
- Suborder: Gekkota
- Family: Gekkonidae
- Genus: Cyrtodactylus
- Species: C. tahuna

Binomial name
- Cyrtodactylus tahuna Riyanto, Arida, & Koch, 2018

Species of lizard

Cyrtodactylus tahuna is a species of gecko that is endemic to Sangir Island in Indonesia.
