= Tioman Island bent-toed gecko =

Scientific classification
- Kingdom: Animalia
- Phylum: Chordata
- Class: Reptilia
- Order: Squamata
- Suborder: Gekkota
- Family: Gekkonidae
- Genus: Cyrtodactylus
- Species: C. tiomanensis

Binomial name
- Cyrtodactylus tiomanensis Das & Lim, 2000

Species of lizard

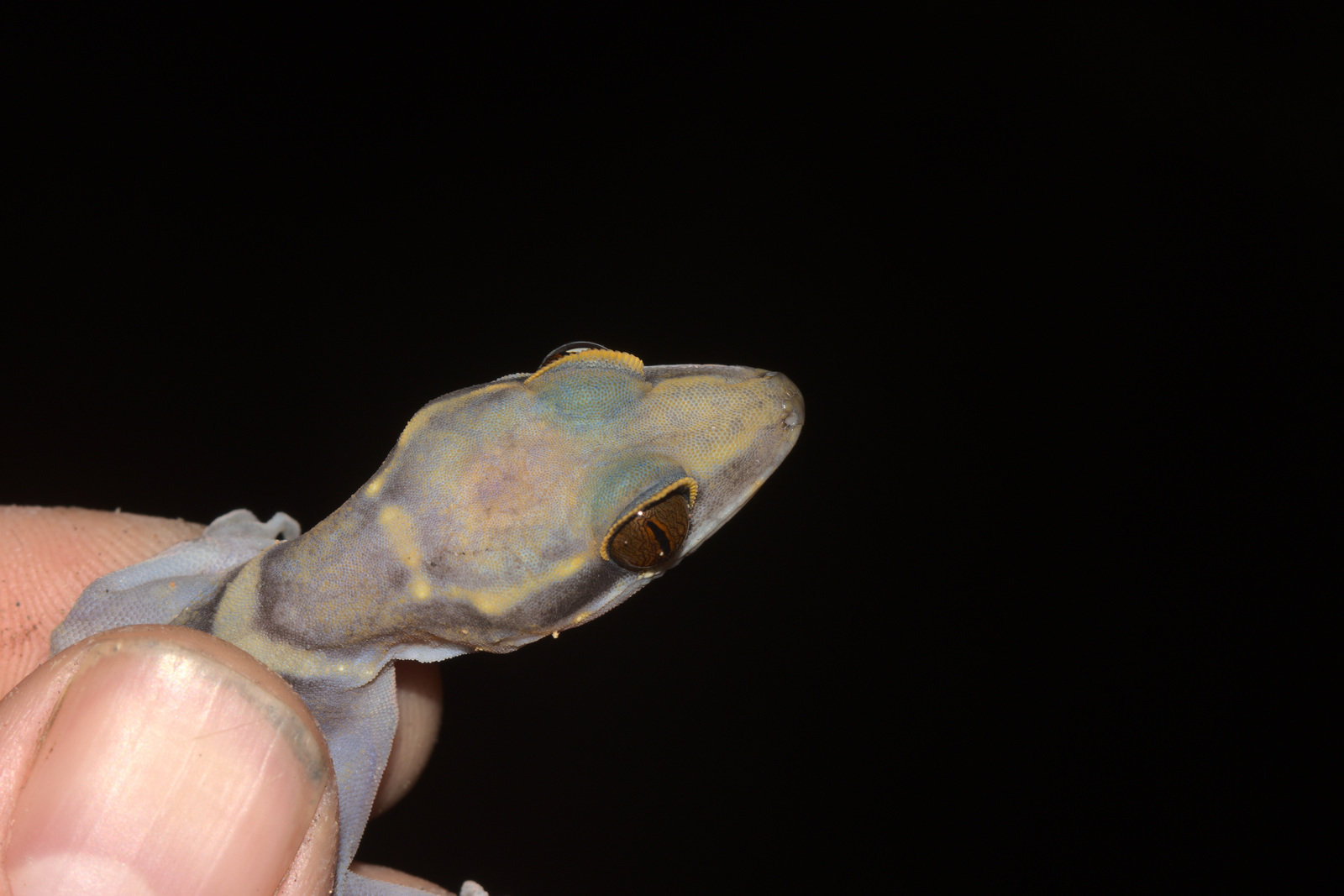
Tioman Island Bent-toed Gecko (Cyrtodactylus tiomanensis).

The Tioman Island bent-toed gecko (Cyrtodactylus tiomanensis) is a species of gecko that is endemic to Tioman Island in Malaysia.
