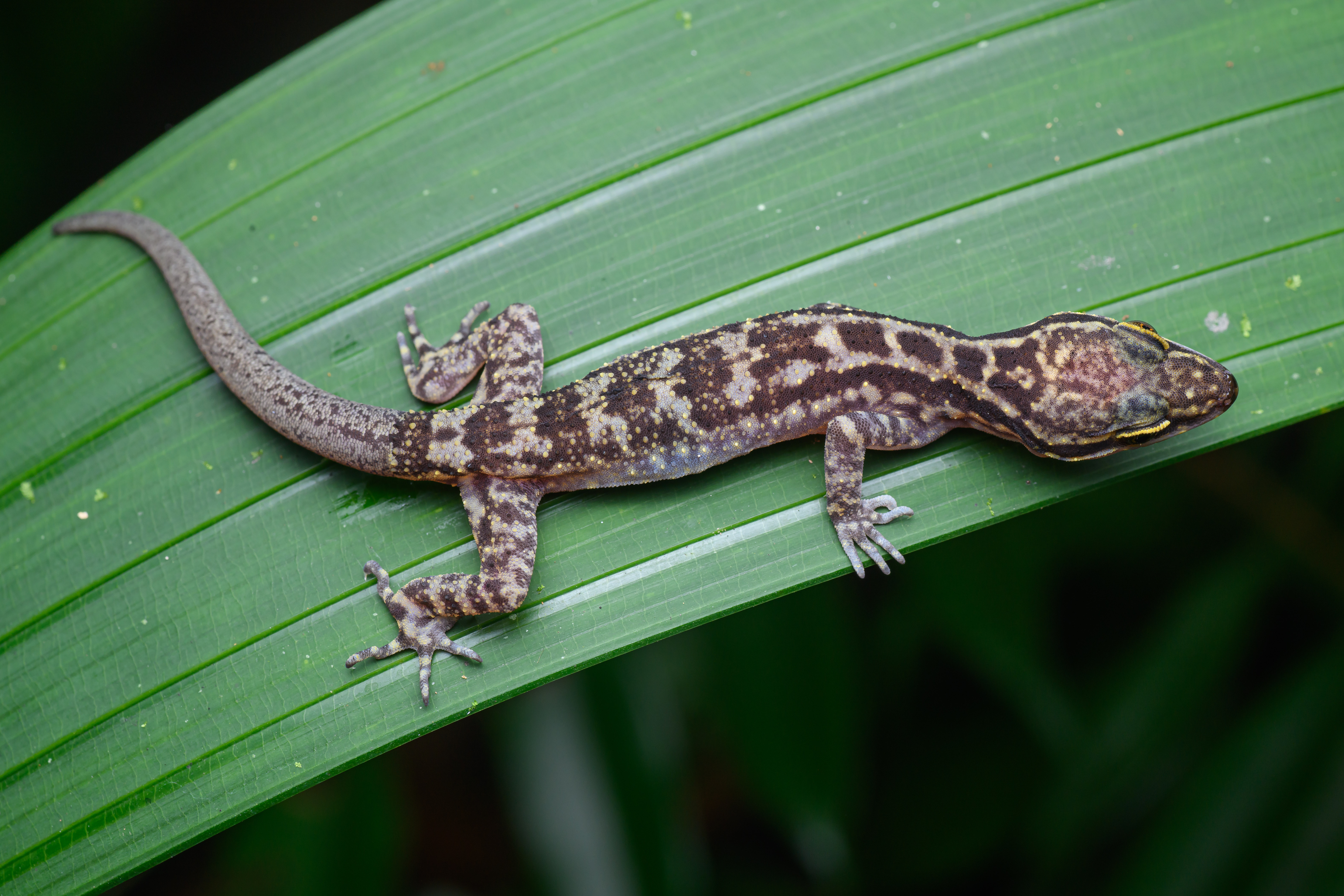

Scientific classification
- Kingdom: Animalia
- Phylum: Chordata
- Class: Reptilia
- Order: Squamata
- Suborder: Gekkota
- Family: Gekkonidae
- Genus: Cyrtodactylus
- Species: C. quadrivirgatus

Binomial name
- Cyrtodactylus quadrivirgatus Taylor, 1962

Synonyms
- Cyrtodactylus quadrivirgatus - Taylor 1962: 210; Cyrtodactylus quadrivirgatus - Taylor 1963: 722; Cyrtodactylus quadrivirgatus - Manthey & Grossmann 1997: 227; Cyrtodactylus quadrivirgatus - COX et al. 1998: 89; Cyrtodactylus (Cyrtodactylus) quadrivirgatus - Rösler 2000: 67; Cyrtodactylus quadrivirgatus - Grismer 2011

= Cyrtodactylus quadrivirgatus =

Taylor's Bow-fingered Gecko

Species of lizard

Cyrtodactylus quadrivirgatus, known as Taylor's bow-fingered gecko, the four-striped forest gecko and the marbled bent-toed gecko, is a species of gecko found in Thailand, Malaysia, Singapore and Indonesia.
