= Cyrtodactylus auralensis =

Scientific classification
- Kingdom: Animalia
- Phylum: Chordata
- Class: Reptilia
- Order: Squamata
- Suborder: Gekkota
- Family: Gekkonidae
- Genus: Cyrtodactylus
- Species: C. auralensis

Binomial name
- Cyrtodactylus auralensis Murdoch, et al. 2019

Species of lizard

Cyrtodactylus auralensis, also known as the Phnom Aural bent-toed gecko, is a species of gecko endemic to Cambodia. It was first described in 2019 as part of a study identifying new species within the Cyrtodactylus intermedius complex. This species is endemic to Cambodia and is known only from Phnom Aural, the highest mountain in the country.

== Anatomy ==
The coloration is described based on a specimen in alcohol having a light brown color on the dorsal head, body, and tail, with dark-brown blotches on dorsum of the head and at least six dark-brown lateral bands bordered by thin, light, lines evenly spaced between the neck and base of the tail.

== Etymology ==
The specific epithet, auralensis, is a reference to the type locality of Phnom Aural mountain, the highest mountain in Cambodia, to which it presumably endemic.

== Habitat ==
C. auralensis was far more abundant in hill evergreen forests at elevations between 500–600 m than at elevations above 1100 m in the cooler, damper cloud forests.
