= Cyrtodactylus ngoiensis =

Scientific classification
- Kingdom: Animalia
- Phylum: Chordata
- Class: Reptilia
- Order: Squamata
- Suborder: Gekkota
- Family: Gekkonidae
- Genus: Cyrtodactylus
- Species: C. ngoiensis

Binomial name
- Cyrtodactylus ngoiensis Schneider, Luu, Sittivong, Teynie, Le, Nguyen, & Ziegler, 2020

Species of lizard

Cyrtodactylus ngoiensis, also known as the Ngoi bent-toed gecko, is a species of gecko endemic to Laos.
