= Cyrtodactylus urbanus =

Scientific classification
- Kingdom: Animalia
- Phylum: Chordata
- Class: Reptilia
- Order: Squamata
- Suborder: Gekkota
- Family: Gekkonidae
- Genus: Cyrtodactylus
- Species: C. urbanus

Binomial name
- Cyrtodactylus urbanus Purkayastha, Das, Bohra, Bauer, & Agarwal, 2020

Species of lizard

The urban bent-toed gecko (Cyrtodactylus urbanus) is a species of gecko endemic to India.
