= Cyrtodactylus phumyensis =

Scientific classification
- Kingdom: Animalia
- Phylum: Chordata
- Class: Reptilia
- Order: Squamata
- Suborder: Gekkota
- Family: Gekkonidae
- Genus: Cyrtodactylus
- Species: C. phumyensis

Binomial name
- Cyrtodactylus phumyensis Ostrowski, Do, Le, Ngo, Pham, Nguyen, Nguyen, & Ziegler, 2020

Species of lizard

Cyrtodactylus phumyensis, the Phu My bent-toed gecko, is a species of gecko endemic to Vietnam.
