= Cyrtodactylus exercitus =

Scientific classification
- Kingdom: Animalia
- Phylum: Chordata
- Class: Reptilia
- Order: Squamata
- Suborder: Gekkota
- Family: Gekkonidae
- Genus: Cyrtodactylus
- Species: C. exercitus

Binomial name
- Cyrtodactylus exercitus Purkayastha, Lalremsanga, Litho, Rathee, Bohra, Mathipi, Biakizuala, & Muansanga, 2022

Species of lizard

Cyrtodactylus exercitus is a species of gecko, a lizard in the family Gekkonidae. The species is endemic to India.
