= Cyrtodactylus orlovi =

Scientific classification
- Kingdom: Animalia
- Phylum: Chordata
- Class: Reptilia
- Order: Squamata
- Suborder: Gekkota
- Family: Gekkonidae
- Genus: Cyrtodactylus
- Species: C. orlovi

Binomial name
- Cyrtodactylus orlovi Do, Phung, Ngo, Le, Ziegler, Pham, & Nguyen, 2021

Species of lizard

Cyrtodactylus orlovi is a species of gecko endemic to Vietnam.

The gecko was first found in 2021, in Ninh Thuan Province.
