= Cyrtodactylus tibetanus =

Scientific classification
- Kingdom: Animalia
- Phylum: Chordata
- Class: Reptilia
- Order: Squamata
- Suborder: Gekkota
- Family: Gekkonidae
- Genus: Cyrtodactylus
- Species: C. tibetanus

Binomial name
- Cyrtodactylus tibetanus Boulenger, 1905)

Synonyms
- Alsophylax tibetanus; Gymnodactylus tibetanus; Tenuidactylus tibetanus; Cyrtopodion tibetanus; Siwaligekko tibetanus

Species of lizard

Cyrtodactylus tibetanus is a species of gecko that is endemic to Tibet.
