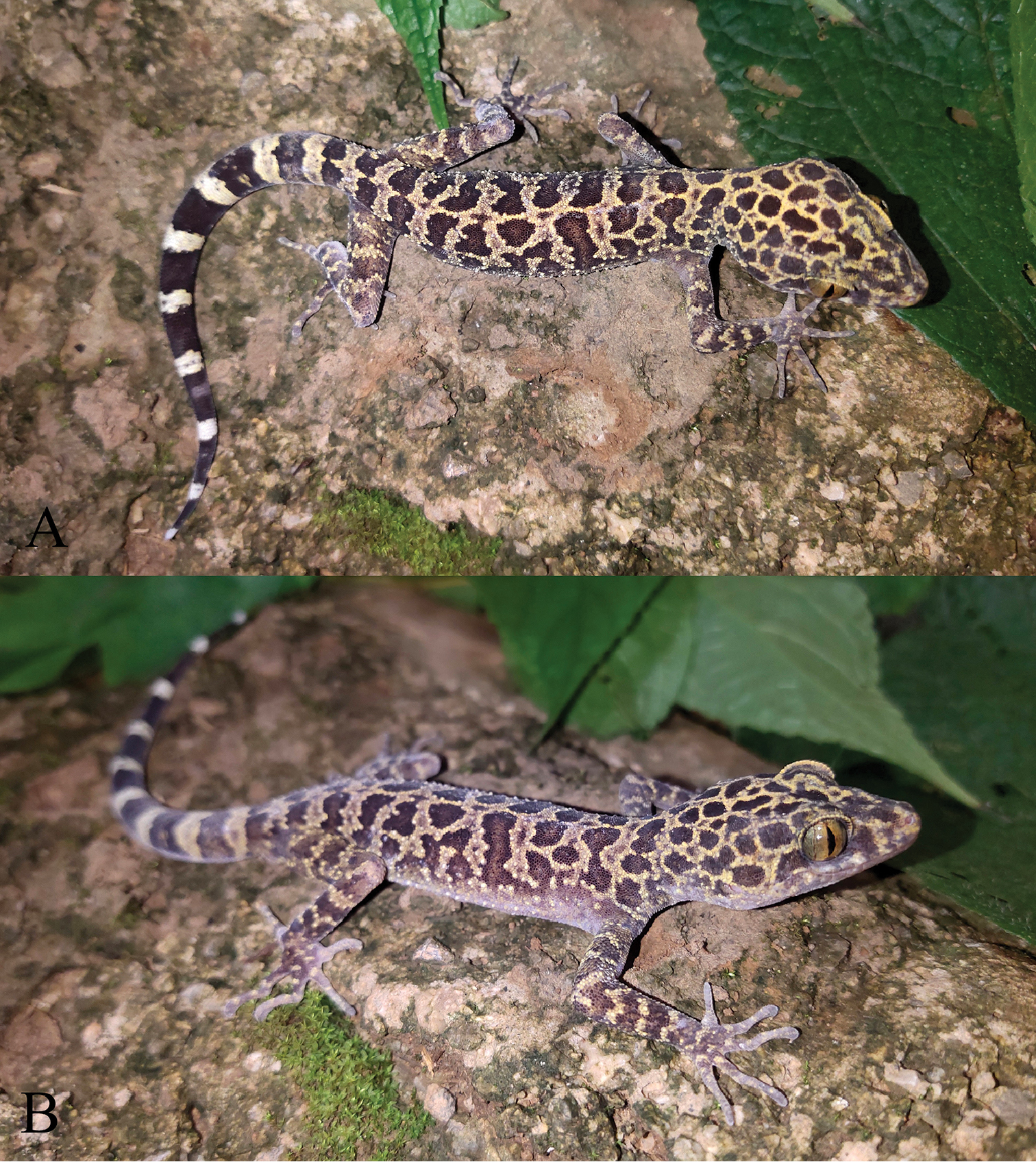

Scientific classification
- Kingdom: Animalia
- Phylum: Chordata
- Class: Reptilia
- Order: Squamata
- Suborder: Gekkota
- Family: Gekkonidae
- Genus: Cyrtodactylus
- Species: C. zhenkangensis

Binomial name
- Cyrtodactylus zhenkangensis Liu & Rao, 2021

= Cyrtodactylus zhenkangensis =

Species of gecko endemic to China

Cyrtodactylus zhenkangensis is a species of gecko that is endemic to China.
