= Kerinci bent-toed gecko =

Conservation status
- Least Concern (IUCN 3.1)

Scientific classification
- Kingdom: Animalia
- Phylum: Chordata
- Class: Reptilia
- Order: Squamata
- Suborder: Gekkota
- Family: Gekkonidae
- Genus: Cyrtodactylus
- Species: C. semicinctus

Binomial name
- Cyrtodactylus semicinctus Harvey, O'Connell, Barraza, Riyanto, Kurniawan, & Smith, 2015

Species of lizard

The Kerinci bent-toed gecko (Cyrtodactylus semicinctus) is a species of gecko that is endemic to Sumatra.
