= Cyrtodactylus pseudoquadrivirgatus =

Scientific classification
- Kingdom: Animalia
- Phylum: Chordata
- Class: Reptilia
- Order: Squamata
- Suborder: Gekkota
- Family: Gekkonidae
- Genus: Cyrtodactylus
- Species: C. pseudoquadrivirgatus

Binomial name
- Cyrtodactylus pseudoquadrivirgatus Rösler, Nguyen, Vu, Ngo, & Ziegler, 2008

Species of lizard

Cyrtodactylus pseudoquadrivirgatus is a species of gecko that is endemic to central Vietnam.
