= Cyrtodactylus bapme =

Scientific classification
- Domain: Eukaryota
- Kingdom: Animalia
- Phylum: Chordata
- Class: Reptilia
- Order: Squamata
- Infraorder: Gekkota
- Family: Gekkonidae
- Genus: Cyrtodactylus
- Species: C. bapme

Binomial name
- Cyrtodactylus bapme Kamei & Mahony, 2021

Species of lizard

Cyrtodactylus bapme, the Garo Hills bent-toed gecko, is a species of gecko endemic to India.
