= Cyrtodactylus punctatus =

Scientific classification
- Kingdom: Animalia
- Phylum: Chordata
- Class: Reptilia
- Order: Squamata
- Suborder: Gekkota
- Family: Gekkonidae
- Genus: Cyrtodactylus
- Species: C. punctatus

Binomial name
- Cyrtodactylus punctatus (JE Gray, 1867)

Species of gecko

Cyrtodactylus punctatus is a species of gecko endemic to Sri Lanka.
