= Martin's bent-toed gecko =

Scientific classification
- Domain: Eukaryota
- Kingdom: Animalia
- Phylum: Chordata
- Class: Reptilia
- Order: Squamata
- Infraorder: Gekkota
- Family: Gekkonidae
- Genus: Cyrtodactylus
- Species: C. martini

Binomial name
- Cyrtodactylus martini Tri, 2011

Species of lizard

Martin's bent-toed gecko (Cyrtodactylus martini) is a species of gecko that is endemic to northwestern Vietnam.
