= Cyrtodactylus ngati =

Scientific classification
- Kingdom: Animalia
- Phylum: Chordata
- Class: Reptilia
- Order: Squamata
- Suborder: Gekkota
- Family: Gekkonidae
- Genus: Cyrtodactylus
- Species: C. ngati

Binomial name
- Cyrtodactylus ngati Le, Sitthivong, Tran, Grismer, Nguyen, Le, Ziegler, & Luu, 2021

Species of lizard

Cyrtodactylus ngati is a species of gecko that is endemic to Vietnam.
