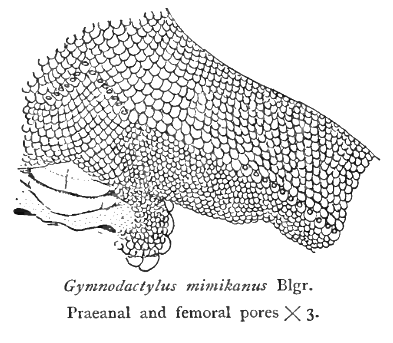

Conservation status
- Least Concern (IUCN 3.1)

Scientific classification
- Kingdom: Animalia
- Phylum: Chordata
- Class: Reptilia
- Order: Squamata
- Suborder: Gekkota
- Family: Gekkonidae
- Genus: Cyrtodactylus
- Species: C. mimikanus

Binomial name
- Cyrtodactylus mimikanus (Boulenger, 1914)

Synonyms
- Gymnodactylus mimikanus; Gonydactylus mimikanus

= Cyrtodactylus mimikanus =

Species of lizard

Cyrtodactylus mimikanus, also known as the false bow-fingered gecko, the Mimika bow-fingered gecko, or Mimika bent-toed gecko, is a species of gecko that is endemic to Papua New Guinea.
