= Cyrtodactylus jaintiaensis =

Scientific classification
- Kingdom: Animalia
- Phylum: Chordata
- Order: Squamata
- Suborder: Gekkota
- Family: Gekkonidae
- Genus: Cyrtodactylus
- Species: C. jaintiaensis

Binomial name
- Cyrtodactylus jaintiaensis Agarwal, Mahony, Giri, Chaitanya, & Bauer, 2018

Species of lizard

Cyrtodactylus jaintiaensis is a species of gecko endemic to India.
