= Golden-belted bent-toed gecko =

Scientific classification
- Kingdom: Animalia
- Phylum: Chordata
- Class: Reptilia
- Order: Squamata
- Suborder: Gekkota
- Family: Gekkonidae
- Genus: Cyrtodactylus
- Species: C. auribalteatus

Binomial name
- Cyrtodactylus auribalteatus Sumontha, Panitvong & Deein, 2010

Species of lizard

The golden-belted bent-toed gecko (Cyrtodactylus auribalteatus) is a species of gecko endemic to Thailand.
