= Cyrtodactylus kapitensis =

Scientific classification
- Kingdom: Animalia
- Phylum: Chordata
- Class: Reptilia
- Order: Squamata
- Suborder: Gekkota
- Family: Gekkonidae
- Genus: Cyrtodactylus
- Species: C. kapitensis

Binomial name
- Cyrtodactylus kapitensis Davis, Nashriq, Woytek, Wikramanayake, Bauer, Karin, Brennan, Iskandar, & Das, 2023

Species of gecko

Cyrtodactylus kapitensis is a species of gecko endemic to Malaysia.
