= Cyrtodactylus amphipetraeus =

Scientific classification
- Kingdom: Animalia
- Phylum: Chordata
- Class: Reptilia
- Order: Squamata
- Suborder: Gekkota
- Family: Gekkonidae
- Genus: Cyrtodactylus
- Species: C. amphipetraeus

Binomial name
- Cyrtodactylus amphipetraeus Chomdej, Suwannapoom, Pawangkhanant, Pradit, Nazarov, Grismer, & Poyarkov, 2020

Species of lizard

Cyrtodactylus amphipetraeus is a species of gecko that is endemic to Thailand.
