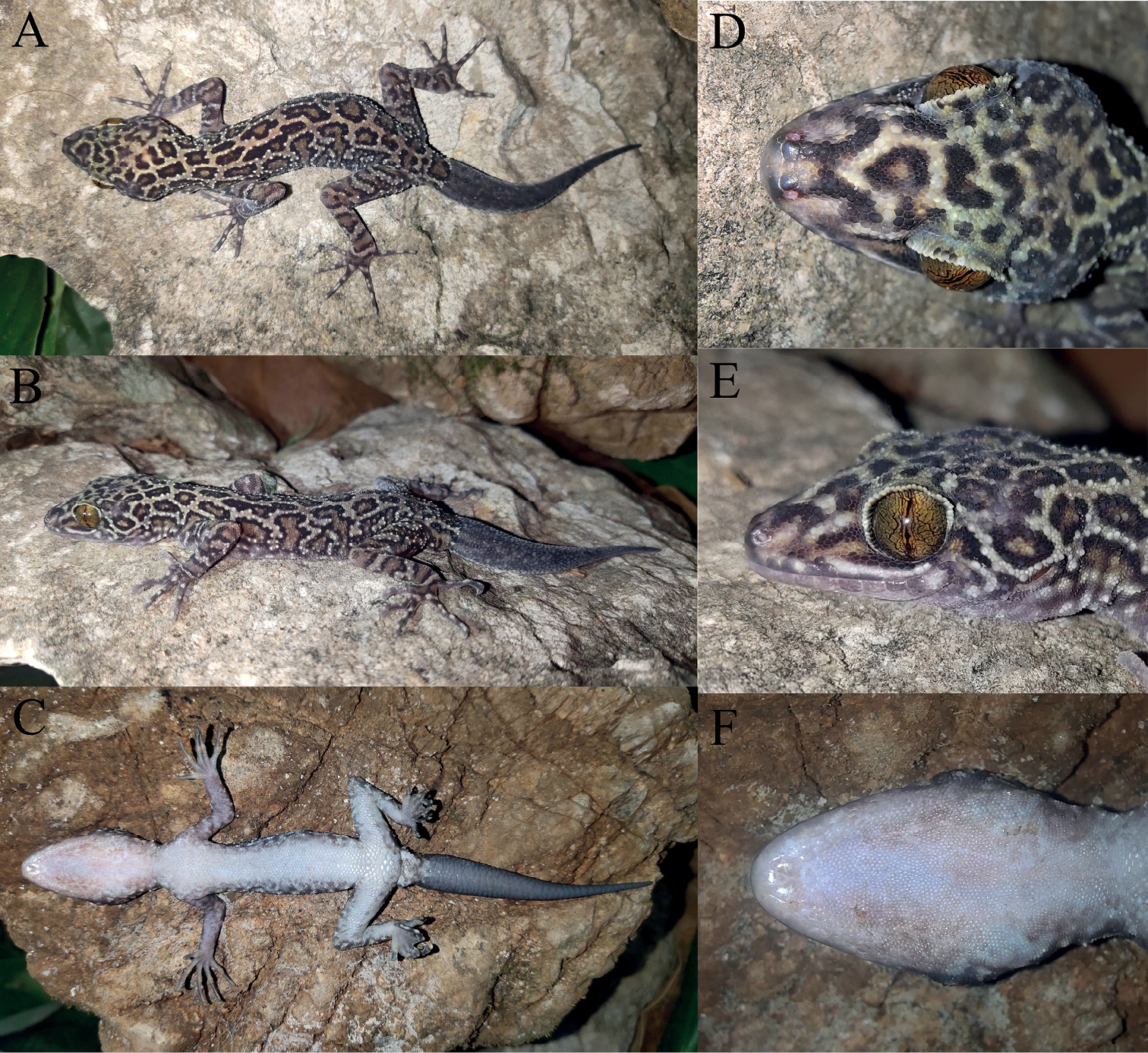
- Cyrtodactylus menglianensis holotype specimen

Scientific classification
- Kingdom: Animalia
- Phylum: Chordata
- Class: Reptilia
- Order: Squamata
- Suborder: Gekkota
- Family: Gekkonidae
- Genus: Cyrtodactylus
- Species: C. menglianensis

Binomial name
- Cyrtodactylus menglianensis Liu & Rao, 2022

= Cyrtodactylus menglianensis =

Species of lizard

Cyrtodactylus menglianensis is a species of gecko, a lizard in the family Gekkonidae. The species is endemic to Malaysia.
