= Cyrtodactylus thuongae =

Conservation status
- Vulnerable (IUCN 3.1)

Scientific classification
- Kingdom: Animalia
- Phylum: Chordata
- Class: Reptilia
- Order: Squamata
- Suborder: Gekkota
- Family: Gekkonidae
- Genus: Cyrtodactylus
- Species: C. thuongae

Binomial name
- Cyrtodactylus thuongae Phung, van Schingen, Ziegler & T.Q. Nguyen, 2014

Species of lizard

Cyrtodactylus thuongae is a species of gecko, a lizard in the family Gekkonidae. The species is endemic to Vietnam.

== Etymology ==
The specific name, thuongae (Latin, feminine, genitive, singular), is in honor of Thuong Thi Lien Nguyen who is the wife of senior binomial authority Trung My Phung.

== Geographic range ==
C. thuongae is found in southern Vietnam, in Tây Ninh Province.

== Habitat ==
The preferred natural habitats of C. thuongae are forest and dry caves, at an altitude of 600 m (2,000 ft).

== Description ==
Medium-sized for its genus, C. thuongae may attain a snout-to-vent length (SVL) of 7.75 cm (3.05 in).

== Reproduction ==
The mode of reproduction of C. thuongae is unknown.
