= Cyrtodactylus limajalur =

Scientific classification
- Kingdom: Animalia
- Phylum: Chordata
- Class: Reptilia
- Order: Squamata
- Suborder: Gekkota
- Family: Gekkonidae
- Genus: Cyrtodactylus
- Species: C. limajalur

Binomial name
- Cyrtodactylus limajalur Davis, Bauer, Jackman, Nashriq, & Das, 2019

Species of lizard

Cyrtodactylus limajalur, the five-banded bent-toed gecko, is a species of gecko that is endemic to East Malaysia.
