= Yoshi's bow-fingered gecko =

Conservation status
- Least Concern (IUCN 3.1)

Scientific classification
- Kingdom: Animalia
- Phylum: Chordata
- Class: Reptilia
- Order: Squamata
- Suborder: Gekkota
- Family: Gekkonidae
- Genus: Cyrtodactylus
- Species: C. yoshii

Binomial name
- Cyrtodactylus yoshii Hikida, 1990

Species of lizard

Yoshi's bow-fingered gecko (Cyrtodactylus yoshii) is a species of lizard in the family Gekkonidae. The species is endemic to Malaysia.

== Etymology ==
The specific name, yoshii, is in honor of Japanese biologist Ryozo Yoshii (died ca. 1999).

== Geographic range ==
C. yoshii is found in the Malaysian state of Sabah on the island of Borneo.

== Habitat ==
The preferred natural habitat of C. yoshii is forest, where it can be found on the trunks of trees and on the walls of man-made structures.

== Description ==
Large and robust for its genus, C. yoshii may attain a snout-to-vent length (SVL) of 9.6 cm (3.8 in).

== Diet ==
C. yoshii preys upon large insects.

== Reproduction ==
C. yoshii is oviparous, but further details of its reproductive habits are unknown.
