= Multipored bent-toed gecko =

Scientific classification
- Kingdom: Animalia
- Phylum: Chordata
- Class: Reptilia
- Order: Squamata
- Suborder: Gekkota
- Family: Gekkonidae
- Genus: Cyrtodactylus
- Species: C. multiporus

Binomial name
- Cyrtodactylus multiporus Nazarov, Poyarkov, Orlov, Nguyen, Milto, Martynov, Konstantinov, & Chulisov, 2014

Species of lizard

The multipored bent-toed gecko (Cyrtodactylus multiporus) is a species of gecko that is endemic to Laos.
