= Eisenman's bent-toed gecko =

Conservation status
- Least Concern (IUCN 3.1)

Scientific classification
- Kingdom: Animalia
- Phylum: Chordata
- Class: Reptilia
- Order: Squamata
- Suborder: Gekkota
- Family: Gekkonidae
- Genus: Cyrtodactylus
- Species: C. eisenmani

Binomial name
- Cyrtodactylus eisenmani Ngo, 2008

Synonyms
- Cyrtodactylus eisenmani Ngo, 2008; Cyrtodactylus eisenmanae — Geissler et al., 2009

Species of lizard

Eisenman's bent-toed gecko (Cyrtodactylus eisenmanae) is a species of gecko, a lizard in the family Gekkonidae. The species is endemic to Vietnam.

== Etymology ==
The specific name, eisenmanae (feminine, genitive singular), is in honor of American conservationist Stephanie Eisenman of the World Wildlife Fund.

== Geographic range ==
C. eisenmanae is found on Hon Son Island, Kiên Giang Province, extreme southwestern Vietnam.

== Habitat ==
The preferred natural habitat of C. eisenmanae is caves.

== Description ==
C. eisenmanae has an average snout-to-vent length (SVL) of 81 mm (3.2 in) and is chocolate brown.

== Behavior ==
C. eisenmanae is terrestrial and nocturnal.

== Reproduction ==
C. eisenmanae is oviparous.
