= Hinnamno bent-toed gecko =

Scientific classification
- Kingdom: Animalia
- Phylum: Chordata
- Class: Reptilia
- Order: Squamata
- Suborder: Gekkota
- Family: Gekkonidae
- Genus: Cyrtodactylus
- Species: C. hinnamnoensis

Binomial name
- Cyrtodactylus hinnamnoensis Luu, Bonkowski, Nguyen, Le, Schneider, Ngo, & Ziegler, 2016

Species of lizard

The Hinnamno bent-toed gecko (Cyrtodactylus hinnamnoensis) is a species of gecko that is endemic to central Laos.

Hinnamno refers to Hin Namno National Park.
