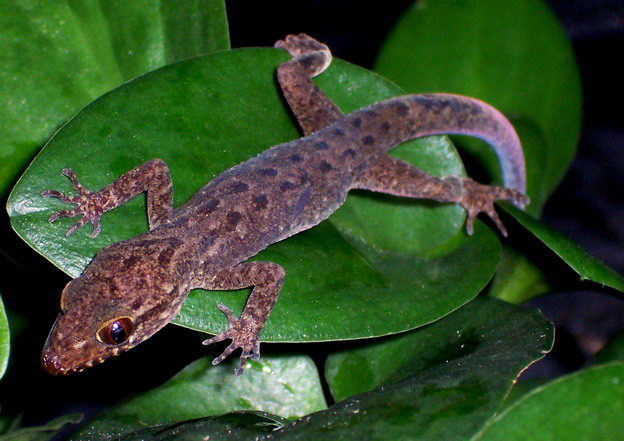
- Marbled bow-fingered gecko (Cyrtodactylus marmoratus)

Scientific classification
- Kingdom: Animalia
- Phylum: Chordata
- Class: Reptilia
- Order: Squamata
- Suborder: Gekkota
- Family: Gekkonidae
- Subfamily: Gekkoninae
- Genus: Cyrtodactylus; Gray, 1827

Species
- 407, see text.

= Cyrtodactylus =

Genus of lizards

Cyrtodactylus (Greek κυρτος kurtos "curved", from κυπτω kuptō "to stoop"; δακτυλος daktulos "finger, toe") is a diverse genus of Asian geckos, commonly known as bent-toed geckos, bow-fingered geckos, and forest geckos. The genus has 407 described species as of 2026, which makes it the largest of all gecko genera and the second-largest of all reptile genera, behind the genus Anolis, with 428 described species.

== Description ==
Instead of possessing dilated digits like other geckos, members of Cyrtodactylus have slender, curved toes to which the common names for the genus can be attributed.

== Taxonomy ==
The phylogenetic relationships with this genus and the genus Geckoella has not been resolved to date. Based on morphology, Bauer (2002) suggested that it was a subgenus of Cyrtodactylus but a phylogenetic study by Feng et al. (2007), though with inadequate sampling of taxa, restored it to generic status once again. All species of Geckoella have been placed here pending a more definitive study.

== Phylogeny ==
The following phylogeny is from Pyron, et al. (2013), and includes 22 Cyrtodactylus species. Cyrtodactylus is a sister group of Hemidactylus.

- Cyrtodactylus
  - - Cyrtodactylus oldhami
    - - Cyrtodactylus ayeyarwadyensis
      - - - Cyrtodactylus angularis
          - Cyrtodactylus jarujini
        - - - Cyrtodactylus triedrus
            - - - Cyrtodactylus marmoratus
                - - - Cyrtodactylus irregularis
                    - Cyrtodactylus consobrinus
                  - - Cyrtodactylus annulatus
                    - - Cyrtodactylus philippinicus
                      - Cyrtodactylus agusanensis
          - - Cyrtodactylus intermedius
            - - Cyrtodactylus pulchellus
              - - - - Cyrtodactylus sermowaiensis
                    - Cyrtodactylus loriae
                  - - Cyrtodactylus novaeguineae
                    - Cyrtodactylus tuberculatus
                - - - Cyrtodactylus klugei
                    - Cyrtodactylus robustus
                  - - Cyrtodactylus tripartitus
                    - - Cyrtodactylus epiroticus
                      - Cyrtodactylus louisiadensis

== Species ==
The genus Cyrtodactylus contains 407 described species, with new species being described frequently.

Species	Authority	Common name	Geographic range
C. aaronbaueri	Purkayastha, Lalremsanga, Bohra, Biakzuala, Decemson, Muansanga, Vabeiryureilai & Rathee, 2021		India
C. aaroni	Günther & Rösler, 2003		New Guinea
C. adleri	Das, 1997		Nicobar Islands, Andaman Sea, India
C. adorus	Shea, Couper, Wilmer & Amey, 2011		Queensland, Australia
C. aequalis	Bauer, 2003		Mon State, Myanmar
C. agamensis	(Bleeker, 1860)	Agam bow-fingered gecko	Sumatra, Indonesia
C. agarwali	Purkayastha, Lalremsanga, Bohra, Biakzuala, Decemson, Muansanga, Vabeiryureilai & Rathee, 2021		India
C. agusanensis	Taylor, 1915	Mindanao bow-fingered gecko	Mindanao, Philippines
C. albofasciatus	(Boulenger, 1885)	Boulenger's Indian gecko	Western Ghats, India
C. amphipetraeus	Chomdej, Suwannapoom, Pawangkhanant, Pradit, Nazarov, Grismer & Poyarkov, 2020	Tak bent-toed gecko	Tak, Thailand
C. angularis	(M.A. Smith, 1921)	angulated bow-fingered gecko	Eastern Thailand
C. annandalei	Bauer, 2003	Annandale's leaf-toed gecko	Sagaing Division, Myanmar
C. annapurnaensis	Bhattari, Gautam, Prasad, Neupane, Khandekar, Thackeray, Agarwal, Tillack, Olson, Hogan & Wright, 2025	ACAP leaf-toed gecko	Nepal
C. annulatus	Taylor, 1915	Annulated bow-fingered gecko	Mindanao, Philippines
C. aravindi	Narayanan, Das, Balan, Tom, Divakar, Kp, Hopeland & Deepak, 2022		India
C. arcanus	Oliver, Richards & Sistrom, 2012		Papua New Guinea
C. arunachalensis	Mirza, Bhosale, Ansari, Phansalkar, Sawant, Gowande & Patel, 2021		India (Arunachal Pradesh)
C. astrum	Grismer, Wood, Quah, Anuar, Muin, Sumontha, Ahmad, Bauer, Wangkulangkul, Grismer & Pauwels, 2012	Starry bent-toed gecko	Southern Thailand, Peninsular Malaysia
C. atremus	Kraus & Weijola, 2019		Papua New Guinea
C. aunglini	Murdoch, Grismer, Wood, Thura, Win, Grismer, Trueblood & Quah, 2018	Kyauk Nagar Cave bent-toed gecko	Myanmar
C. auralensis	Murdoch, Grismer, Wood, Neang, Poyarkov, Ngo, Nazarov, Aowphol, Pauwels, Nguyen & Grismer, 2019	Phnom Aural bent-toed gecko	Phnom Aural, Cambodia
C. aurensis	Grismer, 2005	Aur Island bent-toed gecko	Aur Island, Malaysia
C. auribalteatus	Sumontha, Panitvong & Deein, 2010	Golden-belted bent-toed gecko	Phitsanulok, Thailand
C. australotitiwangsaensis	Grismer, Wood, Quah, Anuar, Muin, Sumontha, Ahmad, Bauer, Wangkulangkul, Grismer & Pauwels, 2012	Southern Titiwangsa bent-toed gecko	Peninsular Malaysia
C. awalriyantoi	Ahda, Nugraha, Hon Tjong, Kurniawan, Amardi, Fauzi & Lin, 2023	Awal Riyanto's Bent-toed Gecko	Sumatra, Indonesia
C. ayeyarwadyensis	Bauer, 2003		Rakhine State, Myanmar
C. badenensis	Nguyen, Orlov & Darevsky, 2006		Southern Vietnam
C. baluensis	Mocquard, 1890	Balu bow-fingered gecko	Mount Kinabalu, Borneo
C. bansocensis	Luu, Nguyen, Le, Bonkowski & Ziegler, 2016	Ban Soc bent-toed gecko	Laos
C. bapme	Kamei & Mahony, 2021	Garo Hills bent-toed gecko	India
C. batik	Iskandar, Rachmansah & Umilaela, 2011	Batik bent-toed gecko	Indonesia
C. battalensis	Khan, 1993	Reticulate plump-bodied gecko	Pakistan
C. batucolus	L.L. Grismer, Onn, J.L. Grismer, Wood & Belabut, 2008	Besar Island bent-toed gecko	Pulau Besar of the Water Islands Archipelago off the west coast of Melaka, Peninsular Malaysia
C. bayinnyiensis	Grismer, Wood Jr., Thura, Quah, Murdoch, Grismer, Herr, Lin & Kyaw, 2018	Bayin Nyi Cave bent-toed gecko	Myanmar
C. bengkhuaiai	Purkayastha, Lalremsanga, Bohra, Biakzuala, Decemson, Muansanga, Vabeiryureilai & Rathee, 2021		India
C. bhupathyi	Agarwal, Mahony, Giri, Chaitanya & Bauer, 2018		Northeast India
C. bichnganae	Tri & Grismer, 2010	Bich Ngan's bent-toed gecko	Vietnam
C. bidoupimontis	Nazarov, Poyarkov, Orlov, Phung, Nguyen, Hoang & Ziegler, 2012		Vietnam
C. bintangrendah	Grismer, Wood, Quah, Anuar, Muin, Sumontha, Ahmad, Bauer, Wangkulangkul, Grismer & Pauwels, 2012	Bintang lowland bent-toed gecko	Peninsular Malaysia
C. bintangtinggi	Grismer, Wood, Quah, Anuar, Muin, Sumontha, Ahmad, Bauer, Wangkulangkul, Grismer & Pauwels, 2012		Peninsular Malaysia
C. biordinis	Brown & Mccoy, 1980	Guadalcanal bow-fingered gecko	Mount Austen, Guadalcanal, Solomon Islands
C. bobrovi	Nguyen et al., 2015	Bobrov's bent-toed gecko	Vietnam
C. bokorensis	Murdoch, Grismer, Wood, Neang, Poyarkov, Ngo, Nazarov, Aowphol, Pauwels, Nguyen & Grismer, 2019		Bokor Plateau, Cambodia
C. boreoclivus	Oliver, Krey, Mumpuni & Richards, 2011		Papua New Guinea
C. brevidactylus	Bauer, 2002		Myanmar
C. brevipalmatus	(M.A. Smith, 1923)	Kampuchea bow-fingered gecko, short-hand forest gecko	Khao Luang, Nakhon Si Thammarat, Peninsular Thailand
C. buchardi	David, Teynie & Ohler, 2004		Laos
C. bugiamapensis	Nazarov, Poyarkov, Orlov, Phung, Nguyen, Hoang & Ziegler, 2012		Vietnam
C. calamei	Luu, Bonkowki, Nguyen, Le, Schneider, Ngo & Ziegler, 2016	Calame's bent-toed gecko	central Laos
C. camortensis	Chandramouli, 2020		Kamorta, Nicobar Islands
C. caovansungi	Orlov & Quang Truong, 2007		Vietnam
C. capreoloides	Rösler, Richards & Günther, 2007		Papua New Guinea
C. cardamomensis	Murdoch, Grismer, Wood, Neang, Poyarkov, Ngo, Nazarov, Aowphol, Pauwels, Nguyen & Grismer, 2019	Cardamom Mountains bent-toed gecko	Cardamom Mountains, Cambodia
C. cattienensis	Geissler, Nazarov, Orlov, Böhme, Phung, Nguyen & Ziegler, 2009	Cattien bent-toed gecko	Vietnam
C. cavernicolus	Inger & King, 1962	Sarawak bow-fingered gecko, Niah Cave gecko	Sarawak
C. cayuensis	Li, 2007	Cayu bent-toed gecko	China (Cayu County, Xizang)
C. celatus	Kathriner et al., 2014		Indonesia
C. chamba	AgarwaL, Khandekar & Bauer, 2018	Chamba bent-toed gecko	Himachal Pradesh, India
C. chanhomeae	Bauer, Sumontha & Pauwels, 2003		Thailand
C. chaunghanakwaensis	Grismer, Wood Jr., Thura, Quah, Murdoch, Grismer, Herr, Lin & Kyaw, 2018	Chaunghanakwa Hill bent-toed gecko	Myanmar
C. chauquangensis	Quang, Orlov, et al. 2007		Vietnam
C. chengodumalaensis	Agarwal, Umesh, Das & Bauer, 2023	Chengodumala geckoella, coastal Kerala geckoella	India
C. chrysopylos	Bauer, 2003		Panluang-Pyadakin Wildlife Sanctuary, Shan State, Myanmar
C. chungi	Ostrowski, Le, Ngo, Pham, Phung, Nguyen & Ziegler, 2021	Chung's bent-toed gecko	Binh Thuan province, Vietnam
C. collegalensis	(Beddome, 1870)	forest spotted gecko, Kollegal ground gecko	India
C. condorensis	(M.A. Smith, 1921)	Pulo Condore bow-fingered gecko, Con Dao bow-fingered gecko	Pulo Condore Island, Vietnam
C. consobrinoides	Annandale, 1905		southern Myanmar
C. consobrinus	W. Peters, 1871	Peters's bow-fingered gecko, thin-banded forest gecko	Malaysian peninsula, Borneo
C. cracens	Batuwita & Bahir, 2005		Sri Lanka
C. crustulus	Oliver, Hartman, Turner, Wilde, Austin & Richards, 2020	Manus bent-toed gecko	Papua New Guinea (Manus Island)
C. cryptus	Heidrich, Rösler, Thanh, Böhme & Ziegler, 2007		Vietnam
C. cucdongensis	Schneider & Phung TM, 2014	Cucdong bent-toed gecko	Vietnam
C. cucphuongensis	Ngo & Onn, 2011		Vietnam
C. culaochamensis	Tri, Grismer, Thai & Wood, 2020	Cù Lao Chàm bent–toed gecko	Vietnam
C. dammathetensis	Grismer, Wood, Thura, Zin, Quah, Murdoch, Grismer, Lin, Kyaw & Lwin, 2017	Dammathet cave bent-toed gecko	Myanmar
C. darevskii	Nazarov, Poyarkov, Orlov, Nguyen, Milto, Martynov, Konstantinov & Chulisov, 2014	Darevski's bent-toed gecko	Laos
C. darmandvillei	(Weber, 1890)	Darmandville bow-fingered gecko	Flores, Komodo, Pulau Kalao, Sumbawa, Sikka, Lombok in Indonesia
C. dati	Tri, 2013	Dat bent-toed gecko	Vietnam
C. dattanensis	(Khan, 1980)	plump banded gecko, Khan's bow-fingered gecko	Pakistan
C. dattkyaikensis	Grismer, Wood, Quah, Grismer, Thura, Oaks & Lin, 2020	Datt Kyaik Hill bent-toed gecko	Myanmar
C. dayangbuntingensis	Quah, Grismer, Wood Jr. & Sah, 2019		peninsular Malaysia
C. deccanensis	(Günther, 1864)	Günther's Indian gecko	Northern Western Ghats of India
C. derongo	Brown & Parker, 1973	Derongo bow-fingered gecko	Papua, New Guinea
C. deveti	(Brongersma, 1948)	Moluccan bow-fingered gecko	Moluccas, Indonesia
C. dianxiensis	Liu & Rao, 2021	Western Yunnan bent-toed gecko	China
C. doisuthep	Kunya et al. 2014	Doi Suthep bent-toed gecko	Thailand
C. dumnuii	Bauer, Kunya, Sumontha, Niyomwan, Pauwels, Chanhome & Kunya, 2010	Dumnui's bent-toed gecko	Thailand
C. durio	Grismer, Anuar, Quah, Muin, Onn, Grismer & Ahmad, 2010	Durian bent-toed gecko	Malaysia
C. edwardtaylori	Batuwita & Bahir, 2005		Sri Lanka
C. eisenmanae	Ngo, 2008	Eisenman's bent-toed gecko	Vietnam
C. elok	Dring, 1979	Malaysia bow-fingered gecko	southern Thailand, Western Malaysia
C. epiroticus	Kraus, 2008		Papua New Guinea
C. equestris	Oliver, Richards, Mumpuni & Rosler, 2016		Papua New Guinea
C. erythrops	Bauer, Kunya, Sumontha, Niyomwan, Panitvong, Pauwels, Chanhome & Kunya, 2009	Red-eyed bent-toed gecko	Thailand
C. evanquahi	Wood, Grismer, Muin, Anuar & Oaks, 2020	Evan Quah's banded bent-toed gecko	peninsular Malaysia
C. exercitus	Purkayastha, Lalremsanga, Litho, Rathee, Bohra, Mathipi, Biakizuala & Muansanga, 2022		northeast India
C. fasciolatus	(Blyth, 1861)	banded bent-toed gecko	Northwest India
C. feae	(Boulenger, 1893)		Myanmar, Thailand
C. fluvicavus	Grismer, Aowphol, Yodthong, Ampai, Termprayoon, Aksornneam & Rujirawan, 2022		Thailand
C. fraenatus	(Günther, 1864)	Sri Lanka bow-fingered gecko	Sri Lanka
C. fumosus	(F. Müller, 1895)		Sulawesi, Indonesia
C. gansi	Bauer, 2003		Mindat District, Chin State, Myanmar
C. gialaiensis	Luu, Dung, Nguyen, Le & Ziegler, 2017		Vietnam
C. gonjong	Nugraha, Ahda, Tjong, Kurniawan, Riyanto, Fauzi & Lin, 2023	Gonjong bent-toed gecko	Sumatra, Indonesia
C. gordongekkoi	Das, 1994		Lombok, Indonesia
C. grismeri	Ngo, 2008	Grismer's bent-toed gecko	Vietnam
C. guakanthanensis	Grismer, Belabut, Quah, Onn & Wood, 2014	Gua Kanthan bent-toed gecko	Malaysia
C. gubaot	Welton, Siler, Linkem, Diesmos & Brown, 2010		the Philippines
C. gubernatoris	(Annandale, 1913)	Sikkimese bent-toed gecko	Darjeeling, India
C. gulinqingensis	Liu, Li, Hou, Orlov & Ananjeva, 2021	Gulinqing bent-toed gecko	China
C. gunungsenyumensis	Grismer et al., 2016	Gunung Senyum bent-toed gecko	Malaysia
C. guwahatiensis	Agarwal, Mahony, Giri, Chaitanya & Bauer, 2018		India
C. halmahericus	Mertens, 1929		Indonesia
C. hamidyi	Riyanto, Fauzi, Sidik, Mumpuni, Irham, Kurniawan, Ota, Okamoto, Hikida & Grismer, 2021	Hamidy's bent-toed gecko	Indonesia
C. hantu	Davis, Das, Leaché, Karin, Brennan, Jackman, Nashriq, Chan & Bauer, 2021		Malaysia (Sarawak)
C. hekouensis	Zhang, Liu, Bernstein, Wang & Yuan, 2021	Hekou bent-toed gecko	China
C. hidupselamanya	Grismer, Wood, Anuar, Grismer, Quah, Murdoch, Muin, Davis, Auilar, Klabacka, Cobos, Aowphol & Sites, 2016	Chiku bent-toed gecko	peninsular Malaysia
C. hikidai	Riyanto A, 2012		Bunguran island, Indonesia
C. himalayanus	Duda & Sani, 1977	Himalaya bow-fingered gecko	Jammu, India
C. himalayicus	(Annandale, 1906)	Himalaya bent-toed gecko	India (West Bengal, Darjeeling)
C. hinnamnoensis	Luu, Bonkowski, Nguyen, Le, Schneider, Ngo & Ziegler, 2016	Hinnamno bent-toed gecko	Laos
C. hitchi	Riyanto, Kurniati & Engilis, 2016		southeastern Sulawesi, Indonesia
C. hontreensis	Tri, Grismer & Grismer, 2008	Hon Tre bent-toed gecko	Vietnam
C. hoskini	Shea, Couper, Wilmer & Amey, 2011		Queensland, Australia
C. houaphanensis	Schneider, Luu, Sitthivong, Teynié, Le, Nguyen & Ziegler, 2020	Houaphan bent–toed gecko	Laos
C. huongsonensis	Luu, Do & Ziegler, 2011		Vietnam
C. hutan	Davis, Nashriq, Woytek, Wikramanayake, Bauer, Karin, Brennan, Iskandar & Das, 2023		Malaysia
C. hutchinsoni	Oliver, Karkkainen & Richards, 2022		Western Papua New Guinea
C. huynhi	Ngo & Bauer, 2008	Huynh's bent-toed gecko	Vietnam
C. ingeri	Hikida, 1990	Sabah bow-fingered gecko	Sabah, Borneo
C. interdigitalis	(Ulber, 1992)	skin-toe forest gecko	Thailand, Laos
C. intermedius	Ulber, 1993	intermediate bow-fingered gecko	Cambodia, Vietnam, and Thailand
C. inthanon	Kunya et al., 2015	Doi Inthanon bent-toed gecko	Thailand
C. irianjayaensis	Rösler, 2001		Papua, New Guinea
C. irregularis	(M.A. Smith, 1921)	irregular bow-fingered gecko	Vietnam
C. irulaorum	Agarwal, Thackeray & Khandekar, 2023	Irula geckoella	India
C. jaegeri	Luu, Calame, Bonkowski, T. Nguyen & Ziegler, 2014		Laos
C. jaintiaensis	Agarwal, Mahony, Giri, Chaitanya & Bauer, 2018		India
C. jambangan	Welton, Siler, Diesmos & Brown, 2010		the Philippines
C. jarakensis	L.L. Grismer, Onn, J.L. Grismer, Wood & Belabut, 2008	Jarak Island bent-toed gecko	Pulau Jarak off the west coast of Perak, Peninsular Malaysia
C. jarujini	(Ulber, 1992)	Jarujin's forest gecko	Laos and northern Thailand
C. jatnai	Amarasinghe, Riyanto, Mumpuni & Grismer, 2020	Jatna's bent–toed gecko	west Bali, Indonesia
C. jayadityai	Bohra, Deb, Thongni, Bhattacharjee, Biakzuala, Lalremsanga, Swargiary & Roy, 2026		North Tripura, northeast India.
C. jelawangensis	Grismer, Wood, Anuar, Quah et al., 2014	Jelawang bent-toed gecko	Thai-Malay Peninsula
C. jellesmae	Boulenger, 1897	Kabaena bow-fingered gecko	Masarang in Indonesia
C. jeyporensis	(Beddome, 1877)	Jeypore rock gecko	Eastern Ghats, India
C. kamengensis	Mirza, Bhosale, Thackeray, Phansalkar, Sawant, Gowande & Patel, 2022	Kameng River bent-toed gecko	India
C. kapitensis	Davis, Nashriq, Woytek, Wikramanayake, Bauer, Karin, Brennan, Iskandar & Das, 2023		Malaysia
C. karsticolus	Purkayastha, Lalremsanga, Bohra, Biakzuala, Decemson, Muansanga, Vabeiryureilai & Rathee, 2021		India
C. kazirangaensis	Agarwal, Mahony, Giri, Chaitanya & Bauer, 2018		India
C. khammouanensis	Nazarov, Poyarkov, Orlov, Nguyen, Milto, Martynov, Konstantinov & Chulisov, 2014	Khammouane bent-toed gecko	Laos
C. khasiensis	(Jerdon, 1870)	Khasi Hills bent-toed gecko	India and northern Burma
C. khelangensis	Pauwels, Sumontha, Panitvong & Varaguttanonda, 2014	Lampang bent-toed gecko	Thailand
C. kimberleyensis	Aaron & Doughty, 2012	Kimberley bent-toed gecko, East Montalivet Island gecko	Australia
C. kingsadai	Ziegler, Phung, Le & Nguyen, 2013		Vietnam
C. klugei	Kraus, 2008		Papua New Guinea
C. kochangensis	Grismer, Aowphol, Yodthong, Ampai, Termprayoon, Aksornneam & Rujirawan, 2022	Ko Chang bent-toed gecko	Thailand
C. kohrongensis	Grismer, Onn, Oaks, Neang, Sokun, Murdoch, Stuart & Grismer, 2020	Koh Rong Island bent–toed gecko	Cambodia
C. kulenensis	Grismer, Geissler, Neang, Hartmann, Wagner & Poyarkov, 2021		Cambodia
C. kunyai	Pauwels, Sumontha, Keeratikiat & Phanamphon, 2014	Kunya's bent-toed gecko	Thailand
C. laangensis	Murdoch, Grismer, Wood, Neang, Poyarkov, Ngo, Nazarov, Aowphol, Pauwels, Nguyen & Grismer, 2019	Phnom Laang bent-toed gecko	Phnom Laang, Cambodia
C. laevigatus	Darevsky, 1964		Komodo Island
C. langkawiensis	Grismer, Wood, et al., 2012	Langkawi Island bent-toed gecko	Langkawi, Malaysia
C. lateralis	Werner, 1896	Sumatra bow-fingered gecko	Sumatra, Indonesia
C. lawderanus	(Stoliczka, 1871)	Lawder's bent-toed gecko	Northwestern India
C. leegrismeri	Chan & Norhayati, 2010	Tenggol Island bent-toed gecko	Malaysia
C. lekaguli	Grismer et al., 2012		Southern Thailand
C. lenggongensis	Grismer, Wood, Anuar, Grismer, Quah, Murdoch, Muin, Davis, Auilar, Klabacka, Cobos, Aowphol & Sites, 2016	Lenggong bent-toed gecko	peninsular Malaysia
C. lenya	Mulcahy, Thura & Zug, 2017	Lenya banded bent-toed gecko	Myanmar
C. limajalur	Davis, Bauer, Jackman, Nashriq & Das, 2019	five-banded bent-toed gecko	East Malaysia
C. linnoensis	Grismer, Wood, Thura, Zin, Quah, Murdoch, Grismer, Lin, Kyaw & Lwin, 2017	Linno Cave bent-toed gecko	Myanmar
C. linnwayensis	Grismer, Wood, Thura, Zin, Quah, Murdoch, Grismer, Lin, Kyaw & Lwin, 2017	Linn-Way bent-toed gecko	Myanmar
C. lomyenensis	Ngo & Pauwels, 2010	Lomyen bent-toed gecko	Laos
C. loriae	(Boulenger, 1897)	Boulenger's bow-fingered gecko	Papua New Guinea
C. louisiadensis	(DeVis, 1892)	ring-tailed gecko	Louisiade Archipelago, Papua New Guinea
C. lungleiensis	Lalremsanga, Chinliansiama, Chandra Bohra, Biakzuala, Vabeiryureilai, Muansanga, Malsawmdawngliana, Hmar, DeCemson, Siammawii, Das & Purkayastha, 2022		India
C. macrotuberculatus	Grismer & Ahmad, 2008	tuberculate bent-toed gecko, large tubercled bent-toed gecko	Malaysia
C. maelanoi	Grismer, Rujirawan, Termprayoon, Ampai, Yodthong, Wood, Oaks & Aowphol, 2020	Mae La Noi bent-toed gecko	Mae Hong Son Province, Thailand
C. majulah	Grismer, Wood & Lim 2012		Singapore; Sumatra, Indonesia
C. malayanus	De Rooij, 1915	Borneo bow-fingered gecko	Borneo
C. mamanwa	Welton, Siler, Linkem, Diesmos & Brown, 2010		The Philippines
C. mandalayensis	Mahony, 2009		Myanmar
C. manos	Oliver, Karkkainen, Rösler & Richards, 2019	yellow-snouted bent-toed gecko	Papua New Guinea
C. markuscombaii	Darevsky, Helfenberger, Orlov & Shah, 1998	striped gecko	Nepal
C. marmoratus	Gray, 1831	marbled bow-fingered gecko	Thailand, Malay Peninsula, Indonesia, Papua New Guinea.
C. martini	Tri, 2011	Martin's bent-toed gecko	Vietnam
C. martinstolli	Darevsky, Helfenberger, Orlov & Shah, 1998	barred gecko	Nepal
C. maryantoi	Riyanto, Jusivani, Mulyadi, Hamidy & Nikmah, 2025	Maryanto’s bent-toed gecko	Simeulue, Indonesia
C. matsuii	Hikida, 1990	Hikida's bow-fingered gecko, Matsui's bent-toed gecko	Sabah, Borneo
C. mcdonaldi	Shea, Couper, Wilwer & Amey 2011		Australia
C. medioclivus	Oliver, Richards & Sistrom, 2012		Papua New Guinea
C. meersi	L. Grismer, Wood, Quah, Murdoch, M. Grismer, Herr, Espinoza, Brown & Lin, 2018	Bago Yoma bent-toed gecko	Myanmar (Yangon)
C. menglianensis	Liu & Rao, 2022		China
C. metropolis	Grismer, Wood, Onn, Anuar & Muin, 2014		Malaysia
C. mimikanus	(Boulenger, 1914)	false bow-fingered gecko, Mimika bow-fingered gecko, Mimika bent-toed gecko	Papua New Guinea
C. minor	Oliver & Richards, 2012		Papua New Guinea
C. miriensis	Davis, Das, Leaché, Karin, Brennan, Jackman, Nashriq, Chan & Bauer, 2021		Malaysia (Sarawak)
C. mombergi	Grismer, Wood, Quah, Thura, Herr & Lin, 2019	Indawgyi bent-toed gecko	Myanmar
C. monilatus	Yodthong, Rujirawan, Stuart, Grismer, Aksornneam, Termprayoon, Ampai & Aowphol, 2022		Thailand
C. montanus	Agarwal, Mahony, Giri, Chaitanya & Bauer, 2018		India
C. muangfuangensis	Sitthivong, Luu, Ha, Nguyen, Le & Ziegler, 2019	Muangfuang bent-toed gecko	Laos
C. multiporus	Nazarov, Poyarkov, Orlov, Nguyen, Milto, Martynov, Konstantinov & Chulisov, 2014	Multipored bent-toed gecko	Laos
C. muluensis	Davis, Bauer, Jackman, Nashriq & Das, 2019	Mulu bent-toed gecko	East Malaysia
C. murua	Kraus & Allison, 2006		Papua New Guinea
C. mursalaensis	Muammar, Martamenggala, Siregar, Pradana, Putra, Hamidy, Smith & Riyanto, 2026	Mursala bent-toed gecko	Mursala Island, Indonesia
C. myaleiktaung	Grismer, Wood, Thura, Win, Grismer, Trueblood & Quah, 2018	Mya Leik Taung bent-toed gecko	Myanmar
C. myintkyawthurai	L. Grismer, Wood, Quah, Murdoch, M. Grismer, Herr, Espinoza, Brown & Lin, 2018	Mt. Popa bent-toed gecko	Myanmar (Mandalay region, Bago Yoma Range, Bago Region)
C. nagalandensis	Agarwal, Mahony, Giri, Chaitanya & Bauer, 2018		India
C. namtiram	Mahony & Kamei, 2021		India
C. naungkayaingensis	Grismer, Wood, Thura, Quah, Murdoch, Grismer, Herr, Lin & Kyaw, 2018		Myanmar
C. nebulicola	Sumidh Ray, Bharath Bhupathi, SuvrajyotiChatterjee, Ritesh Das, Pratyush P. Mohapatra, 2026		eastern Himalayas, West Bengal, India
C. nebulosus	(Beddome, 1870)	Clouded Indian gecko	India
C. nepalensis	Schleich & Kästle, 1998	Nepalese rock gecko	Nepal
C. ngati	Le, Sitthivong, Tran, Grismer, Nguyen, Le, Ziegler & Luu, 2021		Vietnam
C. ngoiensis	Schneider, Luu, Sittivong, Teynie, Le, Nguyen & Ziegler, 2020	Ngoi bent–toed gecko	Laos
C. ngopensis	Bohra, Zonunsanga, Das, Purkayastha, Biakzuala & Lalremsanga, 2022		India
C. nicobaricus	Chandramouli, 2020		Nicobar Islands
C. nigriocularis	Nguyễn, Orlov & Darevsky, 2007		southern Vietnam
C. novaeguineae	(Schlegel, 1844)	New Guinea bow-fingered gecko	New Guinea
C. nuaulu	Oliver, Edgar, Mumpuni, Iskandar & Lilley, 2009		Indonesia
C. nyinyikyawi	Grismer, Wood, Thura, Win & Quah, 2019	Shwe Settaw bent-toed gecko	Myanmar
C. oldhami	(Theobald, 1876)	Oldham's bow-fingered gecko	Myanmar and Thailand
C. orlovi	Do, Phung, Ngo, Le, Ziegler, Pham & Nguyen, 2021		Vietnam
C. otai	Nguyen et al., 2015	Ota's bent-toed gecko	Vietnam
C. pageli	Schneider et al., 2011		Laos
C. panitvongi	Pauwels, Chotjuckdikul, Donbundit, Sumontha & Meesook, 2024	Lopburi bent-toed gecko	Thailand
C. pantiensis	L.L. Grismer, Onn, J.L. Grismer, Wood & Belabut, 2008	Panti Mountain bent-toed gecko	Gunung Panti Forest Reserve, Johor, Peninsular Malaysia
C. papeda	Riyanto, Faz, Amarasinghe, Munir, Fitriana, Hamidy, Kusrini & Oliver, 2022		Obi Island, Indonesia
C. papilionoides	Ulber & Grossmann, 1991	butterfly forest gecko	Thailand
C. papuensis	(Brongersma, 1934)	Papua bow-fingered gecko	Papua New Guinea
C. paradoxus	Darevsky & Szczerbak, 1997		Kieng Giang, Phu Quoc, and Hon Thom Islands in Vietnam
C. payacola	Johnson, Quah, Anuar, Muin, Wood, Grismer, Greer, Onn, Ahmad, Bauer & Grismer, 2012		Malaysia
C. payarhtanensis	Mulcahy, Thura & Zug, 2017	Tenasserim Mountain bent-toed gecko	southern Myanmar
C. peguensis	(Boulenger, 1893)	Thai bow-fingered gecko, Pegu forest gecko	Thailand, western Malaysia, and Myanmar
C. petani	Riyanto, Grismer & Wood, 2015	Farmer's bent-toed gecko	Indonesia
C. pharbaungensis	Grismer, Wood, Thura, Zin, Quah, Murdoch, Grismer, Lin, Kyaw & Lwin, 2017	Pharbaung Cave bent-toed gecko	Myanmar
C. phetchaburiensis	Pawels, Sumontha & Bauer, 2016		Thailand
C. philippinicus	Steindachner, 1867	Philippine bow-fingered gecko	northern Philippines
C. phnomchiensis	Nyang, Henson & Stuart, 2020	Prey Lang bent-toed gecko	Prey Lang, Cambodia
C. phongnhakebangensis	Ziegler, Rösler, Herrmann & Vũ, 2002	Phong Nha-Ke Bang bow-fingered gecko	Vietnam
C. phukhaensis	Chomdej, Pradit, Pawangkhanant, Naiduangchan & Suwannapoom, 2022		Thailand
C. phumyensis	Ostrowski, Do, Le, Ngo, Pham, Nguyen, Nguyen & Ziegler, 2020	Phu My bent-toed gecko	Vietnam
C. phuocbinhensis	S. Nguyen, Le, Tran, Orlov, Lathrop, MacCulloch, Le, Jin, L. Nguyen, T. Nguyen, Hoang, Che, Murphy & Zang, 2013		Vietnam
C. phuquocensis	Tri, Grismer & Grismer, 2010	Phu Quoc bent–toed gecko	Vietnam
C. pinlaungensis	Grismer, Wood, Quah, Thura, Oaks & Lin, 2019	Pinlaung bent-toed gecko	Myanmar
C. pronarus	Shea, Couper, Wilmer & Amey, 2011		Australia
C. psarops	Harvey et al., 2015	Speckle-faced bent-toed gecko	Sumatra, Indonesia
C. pseudoquadrivirgatus	Rösler, Nguyễn, Vũ, Ngô & Ziegler, 2008		central Vietnam
C. pubisulcus	Inger, 1958	Inger's bow-fingered gecko	Borneo
C. puhuensis	Nguyen, Yang, Thi Le, Nguyen, Orlov, Hoang, Nguyen, Jin, Rao, Hoang, Che, Murphy & Zhang, 2014	Pù Hu bent-toed gecko	Vietnam
C. pulchellus	Gray, 1827	Malayan forest gecko	Penang, Malaysia
C. punctatus	Gray, 1867		Sri Lanka
C. pyadalinensis	Grismer, Wood, Thura, Win & Quah, 2019		Myanmar
C. pyinyaungensis	Grismer, Wood, Thura, Zin, Quah, Murdoch, Grismer, Lin, Kyaw & Lwin, 2017	Pyinyaung bent-toed gecko	Myanmar
C. quadrivirgatus	Taylor, 1962	Taylor's bow-fingered gecko, four-striped forest gecko, marbled bent-toed gecko	Thailand, Malaysia, Singapore, and Indonesia
C. raglai	Nguyen, Duong, Grismer & Poyarkov, 2021	Ragla bent-toed gecko	Vietnam
C. raimonaensis	Basfore, Bharali, Barman, Deka, Islam, Deb, Bohra, Bhattacharjee, Das, Hazarika, Naorem & Purkayastha, 2026		Kokrajhar District, Assam, India
C. ranongensis	Sumontha, Pauwels, Panitvong, Kunya & Grismer, 2015	Ranong bent-toed gecko	Thailand
C. redimiculus	King, 1962	Palawan bow-fingered gecko	Palawan, Philippines
C. relictus	Agarwal, Thackeray & Khandekar, 2023	Relict gecko	India
C. rex	Oliver, Richards, Mumpuni & Rösler, 2016		Papua New Guinea
C. rishivalleyensis	Agarwal, 2016	Rishi Valley geckoella	India
C. rivularis	Grismer, Aowphol, Yodthong, Ampai, Termprayoon, Aksornneam & Rujirawan, 2022	Pa La-U bent-toed gecko	Thailand
C. robustus	Kraus, 2008		Papua New Guinea
C. roesleri	Ziegler, Nazarov, Orlov, Nguyen, Vu, Dang, Dinh & Schmitz, 2010	Roesler's bent-toed gecko	Vietnam & Laos
C. rosichonarieforum	Riyanto, Grismer & Wood, 2015	Rosichonariefi's bent-toed gecko	Indonesia
C. rubidus	(Blyth, 1861)	red bow-fingered gecko	Andaman Islands; Myanmar
C. rufford	Luu et al., 2016	Rufford bent-toed gecko	Laos
C. rukhadeva	Grismer, Suwannapoom, Pawangkhanant, Nazarov, Yushchenko, Naiduangchan, Le, Luu & Poyarkov, 2021		western Thailand
C. russelli	Bauer, 2003		Htamanthi Wildlife Sanctuary, Sagaing Division and Indawgyi Wildlife Sanctuary, Rakhine State, Myanmar
C. sadanensis	Grismer, Wood, Thura, Zin, Quah, Murdoch, Grismer, Lin, Kyaw & Lwin, 2017	Sadan Cave bent-toed gecko	Myanmar
C. sadansinensis	Grismer, Wood, Thura, Zin, Quah, Murdoch, Grismer, Lin, Kyaw & Lwin, 2017	Sadan Sin Cave bent-toed gecko	Myanmar
C. sadleiri	Wells & Wellington, 1984	Sadleir's bow-fingered gecko	Christmas Island
C. saiyok	Panitvong, Sumontha, Tunprasert & Pauwels, 2014	Sai Yok bent-toed gecko	Thailand
C. salomonensis	Rösler, Richards & Günther, 2007		Solomon Islands
C. samroiyot	Pauwels & Sumontha, 2014	Sam Roi Yot bent-toed gecko	Thailand
C. sangi	Pauwels, Nazarov, Bobrov & Poyarkov, 2018		southern Vietnam
C. sanook	Pauwels, Sumontha, Latinne & Grismer, 2013	Sanook bent-toed gecko	Thailand
C. sanpelensis	Grismer, Wood, Thura, Zin, Quah, Murdoch, Grismer, Lin, Kyaw & Lwin, 2017	Sanpel Cave bent-toed gecko	Myanmar
C. santana	Chan, Grismer, Santana, Pinto, Loke, Conaboy, 2023		East Timor (Nino Konis Santana National Park)
C. semenanjungensis	Grismer & Leong, 2005	Peninsular bent-toed gecko	western Malaysia
C. semiadii	Riyanto, Bauer & Yudha, 2014		Indonesia
C. semicinctus	Harvey et al., 2015	Kerinci bent-toed gecko	Sumatra, Indonesia
C. septentrionalis	Agarwal, Mahony, Giri, Chaitanya & Bauer, 2018		India
C. septimontium	Murdoch, Grismer, Wood, Neang, Poyarkov, Ngo, Nazarov, Aowphol, Pauwels, Nguyen & Grismer, 2019	Bảy Núi bent-toed gecko	Bảy Núi Hills, Vietnam
C. seribuatensis	Youmans & Grismer, 2006	Seribuat bent-toed gecko	western Malaysia
C. sermowaiensis	(de Rooij, 1915)	DeRooij's bow-fingered gecko	New Guinea
C. serratus	Kraus, 2007		Papua New Guinea
C. sharkari	Grismer et al., 2014	Sharkari's bent-toed gecko	Thai-Malay Peninsula
C. shwetaungorum	Grismer, Wood, Thura, Zin, Quah, Murdoch, Grismer, Lin, Kyaw & Lwin, 2017	Shwetaung bent-toed gecko	Myanmar
C. siahaensis	Purkayastha, Lalremsanga, Litho, Rathee, Bohra, Mathipi, Biakzuala & Muansanga, 2022		northeast India
C. sinyineensis	Grismer, Wood, Thura, Zin, Quah, Murdoch, Grismer, Lin, Kyaw & Lwin, 2017	Sin Yine Cave bent-toed gecko	Myanmar
C. slowinskii	Bauer, 2002		Myanmar
C. soba	Batuwita & Bahir, 2005	Dumbara bent-toed gecko, Knuckles bent-toed gecko	Sri Lanka
C. sommerladi	Luu, Bonkowski, Nguyen, Le, Schneider, Ngo & Ziegler, 2016	Sommerlad's bent-toed gecko	central Laos
C. soni	Le, Nguyen, Le & Ziegler, 2016	Son's bent-toed gecko	Vietnam
C. sonlaensis	Nguyen, Pham, Ziegler, Ngo & Le, 2017		northwestern Vietnam
C. soudthichaki	Luu, Calame, Nguyen, Bonkowski & Ziegler, 2015	Soudthichak's bent-toed gecko	Laos
C. speciosus	(Beddome, 1870)	forest spotted gecko	India
C. spelaeus	Nazarov, Poyarkov, Orlov, Nguyen, Milto, Martynov, Konstantinov & Chulisov, 2014		Laos
C. spinosus	Linkem, McGuire, Hayden, Setiadi, Bickford & Brown, 2008		Sulawesi, Indonesia
C. srilekhae	Agarwal, 2016	Bangalore geckoella	India
C. stellatus	Termprayoon, Rujirawan, Ampai, Wood Jr. & Aowphol, 2021		Tarutao Island, Thailand
C. stresemanni	Rösler & Glaw, 2008	Stresemann's bent-toed gecko	Malaysia
C. sumonthai	Bauer, 2002	Sumontha's gecko	Thailand
C. sumuroi	Welton, Siler, Linkem, Diesmos & Brown, 2010		the Philippines
C. surin	Chan-ard & Makchai (2011)		Thailand
C. sworderi	(M.A. Smith, 1925)	Johore bow-fingered gecko, Kota-tinggi forest gecko, Sworder's bent-toed gecko	Malaysia
C. tahuna	Riyanto, Arida & Koch, 2018		Sangir Island, Indonesia
C. takouensis	Van Tri * Gamble, 2010	Takou bent-toed gecko	Vietnam
C. tamaiensis	(M.A. Smith, 1940)	Tamai bent-toed gecko	Myanmar
C. tambora	Riyanto, Mulyadi, McGuire, Kusrini, Febylasmia, Basyir & Kaiser, 2017	Tambora bent-toed gecko	Sumbawa, Indonesia
C. tanahjampea	Riyanto, Hamidy & McGuire, 2018	Tanahjampea bent-toed gecko	Tanahjampea Island, Indonesia
C. tanim	Nielsen & Oliver, 2017		Papua New Guinea
C. taungwineensis	Grismer, Wood, Quah, Grismer, Thura, Oaks & Lin, 2020	Taung Wine Hill bent-toed gecko	Myanmar
C. tautbatorum	Welton, Siler, Diesmos & Brown, 2009		the Philippines
C. taybacensis	Pham, Le, Ngo, Ziegler & Nguyen, 2019	Taybac bent-toed gecko	Vietnam
C. taynguyenensis	S. Nguyen, Le, Tran, Orlov, Lathrop, Macculloch, Le, Jin, L. Nguyen, T. Nguyen, Hoang, Che, Murphy & Zhang 2013		Vietnam
C. tebuensis	Grismer, Anuar, Muin, Quah & Wood, 2013	Tebu Mountain bent-toed gecko	Malaysia
C. teyniei	David, Nguyen, Schneider & Ziegler, 2011		Laos
C. thathomensis	Nazarov, Pauwels, Konstantinov, Chulisov, Orlov & Poyarkov, 2018	Thathom bent-toed gecko	Laos
C. thirakhupti	Pauwels, Bauer, Sumontha & Chanhome, 2004	Thirakhupt's bent-toed gecko	Thailand
C. thochuensis	Ngo & Grismer, 2012	Thochu bent–toed gecko	Tho Chu Island, Vietnam
C. thongphaphumensis	Grismer, Rujirawan, Chomdej, Suwannapoom, Yodthong, Aksornneam & Aowphol, 2023		Thailand
C. thuongae	Phung, Schingen, Ziegler & T. Nguyen, 2014		Vietnam
C. thylacodactylus	Murdoch, Grismer, Wood, Neang, Poyarkov, Ngo, Nazarov, Aowphol, Pauwels, Nguyen & Grismer, 2019		Phnom Dalai, Cambodia
C. tibetanus	Boulenger, 1905		Tibet
C. tigroides	Bauer, Sumontha & Pauwels, 2003	Tiger bent-toed gecko	Thailand
C. timur	Muin, Mohamed, Onn, Sumarli, Loredo & Heinz, 2014	Banjaran Timur bent-toed gecko	Thai-Malay Peninsula
C. tiomanensis	Das & Lim, 2000	Tioman Island bent-toed gecko	Malaysia
C. triedrus	(Günther, 1864)	spotted bent-toed gecko, Sri Lanka gecko, spotted bow-fingered gecko, spotted ground gecko	Sri Lanka
C. trilatofasciatus	Grismer & Wood, 2012	Cameron Highlands bent-toed gecko	Malaysia
C. tripartitus	Kraus, 2008		Papua New Guinea
C. tripuraensis	Agarwal, Mahony, Giri, Chaitanya & Bauer, 2018		India
C. tuberculatus	Lucas & Frost, 1900		Queensland, Australia
C. urbanus	Purkayastha, Das, Bohra, Bauer & Agarwal, 2020	urban bent-toed gecko	India (Assam)
C. uthaiensis	Grismer, Aowphol, Yodthong, Ampai, Termprayoon, Aksornneam & Rujirawan, 2022	Uthai Thani bent-toed gecko	Thailand
C. varadgirii	Agarwal et al., 2016	Giri's Geckoella	Mumbai, India
C. variegatus	Blyth, 1859	variegated bow-fingered gecko, Moulmein forest gecko	Myanmar and Thailand
C. vedda	Amarasinghe, Karunarathna, Campbell, Gayan, Ranasinghe, De Silva & Mirza, 2022		Sri Lanka
C. vilaphongi	Schneider, Nguyen, Le, Nophaseud, Bonkowski & Ziegler, 2014		Laos
C. wakeorum	Bauer, 2003		Southern Rakhine State, Myanmar
C. wallacei	Hayden, Brown, Gillespie, Setiadi, Linkem, Iskandar, Umilaela, Bickford, Riyanto, Mumpuni & McGuire, 2008		Sulawesi, Indonesia
C. wangkulangkulae	Sumontha et al., 2014	Wangkulangkul's bent-toed gecko	Thailand
C. wayakonei	Nguyen, Kingsada, Rösler, Auer & Ziegler, 2010		Northern Laos & Yunnan, China
C. welpyanensis	Grismer, Wood, Thura, Zin, Quah, Murdoch, Grismer, Lin, Kyaw & Lwin, 2017	Wel Pyan Cave bent-toed gecko	Myanmar
C. wetariensis	Dunn, 1927	Wetar bow-fingered gecko	Wetar, Indonesia
C. yakhuna	(Deraniyagala, 1945)	northern Sri Lanka gecko, spotted bow-fingered gecko, blotch bow-fingered gecko, demon gecko	Sri Lanka
C. yangbayensis	Tri & Onn, 2010	Yangbay bent-toed gecko	Vietnam
C. yathepyanensis	Grismer, Wood, Thura, Zin, Quah, Murdoch, Grismer, Lin, Kyaw & Lwin, 2017	Yathe Pyan Cave bent-toed gecko	Myanmar
C. yoshii	Hikida, 1990	Yoshi's bow-fingered gecko	Sabah, Borneo
C. ywanganensis	Grismer, Wood, Thura, Quah, Murdoch, M. Grismer, Herr, Espinoza & Lin, 2018		Myanmar (Shan)
C. zebraicus	(Taylor, 1962)		Thailand
C. zhaoermii	Shi & Zhao 2010		Tibet, China
C. zhenkangensis	Liu & Rao, 2021		China
C. ziegleri	Nazarov, Orlov, Nguyen & Ho, 2008		Vietnam
C. zugi	Oliver, Tjaturadi, Mumpuni, Krey & Richards, 2008		Melanesia
C. wangkhramensis	Termprayoon, Rujirawan, Grismer, Wood & Aowphol, 2023		Southern Thailand
C. sungaiupe	Termprayoon, Rujirawan, Grismer, Wood & Aowphol, 2023		Southern Thailand
C. kiphire	Boruah, Narayanan, Deepak & Das, 2024		India
C. barailensis	Boruah, Narayanan, Deepak & Das, 2024		India
C. ngengpuiensis	Boruah, Narayanan, Lalronunga, Deepak & Das, 2024		India
C. manipurensis	Boruah, Narayanan, Deepak & Das, 2024		India
C. namdaphaensis	Boruah, Narayanan, Deepak & Das, 2024		India
C. siangensis	Boruah, Narayanan, Aravind, Deepak & Das, 2024		India
C. khlonghatensis	Ampai, Rujirawan, Yodthong, Termprayoon, Stuart & Aowphol, 2024		Thailand
C. pecelmadiun	Riyanto, Sidik, Hamidy, Grismer & Abinawanto, 2025	Pecelmadiun's bent-toed gecko	Indonesia (East Java)
