= Cyrtodactylus russelli =

Conservation status
- Data Deficient (IUCN 3.1)

Scientific classification
- Kingdom: Animalia
- Phylum: Chordata
- Class: Reptilia
- Order: Squamata
- Suborder: Gekkota
- Family: Gekkonidae
- Genus: Cyrtodactylus
- Species: C. russelli

Binomial name
- Cyrtodactylus russelli Bauer, 2003

Species of lizard

Cyrtodactylus russelli is a species of gecko, a lizard in the family Gekkonidae. The species is endemic to Myanmar.

== Etymology ==
The specific name, russelli, is in honor of Canadian herpetologist Anthony Patrick Russell (born 1947).

== Geographic range ==
C. russelli is found in northern Myanmar, in Kachin State and Sagaing Region.

== Habitat ==
The preferred natural habitat of C. russelli is forest.

== Description ==
C. russelli is large for its genus. Maximum recorded snout-to-vent length (SVL) is 11.4 cm (4.5 in).

== Reproduction ==
C. russelli is oviparous.
