= Sommerlad's bent-toed gecko =

Conservation status
- Least Concern (IUCN 3.1)

Scientific classification
- Kingdom: Animalia
- Phylum: Chordata
- Class: Reptilia
- Order: Squamata
- Suborder: Gekkota
- Family: Gekkonidae
- Genus: Cyrtodactylus
- Species: C. sommerladi

Binomial name
- Cyrtodactylus sommerladi Luu, Bonkowski, T.Q. Nguyen, M.D. Le, Schneider, H.T. Ngo & Ziegler, 2016

Species of lizard

Sommerlad's bent-toed gecko (Cyrtodactylus sommerladi) is a species of lizard in the family Gekkonidae. The species is endemic to Laos.

== Etymology ==
The specific name, sommerladi, is in honor of German herpetologist Ralf Sommerlad (1952–2015), who was a Crocodilia specialist.

== Geographic range ==
C. sommerladi is found in central Laos, in Khammouane Province.

== Habitat ==
The preferred natural habitats of C. sommerladi are forest, dry caves, and rocky areas.

== Description ==
C. sommerladi may attain a snout-to-vent length (SVL) of 8 cm (3.1 in).

== Reproduction ==
C. sommerladi is oviparous.
