= Cyrtodactylus houaphanensis =

Scientific classification
- Kingdom: Animalia
- Phylum: Chordata
- Class: Reptilia
- Order: Squamata
- Suborder: Gekkota
- Family: Gekkonidae
- Genus: Cyrtodactylus
- Species: C. houaphanensis

Binomial name
- Cyrtodactylus houaphanensis Schneider, Luu, Sitthivong, Teynie, Le, Nguyen, & Ziegler, 2020

Species of lizard

The Houaphan bent-toed gecko (Cyrtodactylus houaphanensis) is a species of gecko that is endemic to Laos.
