= Cyrtodactylus namtiram =

Scientific classification
- Kingdom: Animalia
- Phylum: Chordata
- Class: Reptilia
- Order: Squamata
- Suborder: Gekkota
- Family: Gekkonidae
- Genus: Cyrtodactylus
- Species: C. namtiram

Binomial name
- Cyrtodactylus namtiram Mahony & Kamei, 2021

Gecko endemic to India

Cyrtodactylus namtiram is a species of gecko that is endemic to India.
