= Rufford bent-toed gecko =

Conservation status
- Data Deficient (IUCN 3.1)

Scientific classification
- Kingdom: Animalia
- Phylum: Chordata
- Class: Reptilia
- Order: Squamata
- Suborder: Gekkota
- Family: Gekkonidae
- Genus: Cyrtodactylus
- Species: C. rufford

Binomial name
- Cyrtodactylus rufford Luu, Calame, Nguyen, Le, Bonkowski, & Ziegler, 2016

Species of lizard

The Rufford bent-toed gecko (Cyrtodactylus rufford) is a species of gecko that is endemic to central Laos.
