= Ban Soc bent-toed gecko =

Scientific classification
- Kingdom: Animalia
- Phylum: Chordata
- Class: Reptilia
- Order: Squamata
- Suborder: Gekkota
- Family: Gekkonidae
- Genus: Cyrtodactylus
- Species: C. bansocensis

Binomial name
- Cyrtodactylus bansocensis Luu, Nguyen, Le, Bonkowski & Ziegler, 2016

Species of lizard

The Ban Soc bent-toed gecko (Cyrtodactylus bansocensis) is a species of gecko endemic to central Laos.
