= Cucdong bent-toed gecko =

Scientific classification
- Kingdom: Animalia
- Phylum: Chordata
- Class: Reptilia
- Order: Squamata
- Suborder: Gekkota
- Family: Gekkonidae
- Genus: Cyrtodactylus
- Species: C. cucdongensis

Binomial name
- Cyrtodactylus cucdongensis Schneider, Phung, Le, Nguyen, & Ziegler, 2014

Species of lizard

The Cucdong bent-toed gecko (Cyrtodactylus cucdongensis) is a species of gecko that is endemic to Vietnam.
