= Cyrtodactylus phukhaensis =

Scientific classification
- Kingdom: Animalia
- Phylum: Chordata
- Class: Reptilia
- Order: Squamata
- Suborder: Gekkota
- Family: Gekkonidae
- Genus: Cyrtodactylus
- Species: C. phukhaensis

Binomial name
- Cyrtodactylus phukhaensis Chomdej, Pradit, Pawangkhanant, Naiduangchan, & Suwannapoom, 2022

Gecko endemic to Vietnam

Cyrtodactylus phukhaensis is a species of gecko that is endemic to Thailand.
