= Phu Quoc bent-toed gecko =

Scientific classification
- Kingdom: Animalia
- Phylum: Chordata
- Class: Reptilia
- Order: Squamata
- Suborder: Gekkota
- Family: Gekkonidae
- Genus: Cyrtodactylus
- Species: C. phuquocensis

Binomial name
- Cyrtodactylus phuquocensis Tri, Grismer, & Grismer, 2010

Species of lizard

The Phu Quoc bent-toed gecko (Cyrtodactylus phuquocensis) is a species of gecko that is endemic to southwestern Vietnam.
