= Cyrtodactylus mandalayensis =

Scientific classification
- Domain: Eukaryota
- Kingdom: Animalia
- Phylum: Chordata
- Class: Reptilia
- Order: Squamata
- Infraorder: Gekkota
- Family: Gekkonidae
- Genus: Cyrtodactylus
- Species: C. mandalayensis

Binomial name
- Cyrtodactylus mandalayensis Mahony, 2009

Species of lizard

Cyrtodactylus mandalayensis is a species of gecko that is endemic to Myanmar.
