= Khammouane bent-toed gecko =

Scientific classification
- Kingdom: Animalia
- Phylum: Chordata
- Class: Reptilia
- Order: Squamata
- Suborder: Gekkota
- Family: Gekkonidae
- Genus: Cyrtodactylus
- Species: C. khammouanensis

Binomial name
- Cyrtodactylus khammouanensis Nazarov, Poyarkov, Orlov, Nguyen, Milto, Martynov, Konstantinov, & Chulisov, 2014

Species of lizard

The Khammouane bent-toed gecko (Cyrtodactylus khammouanensis) is a species of gecko that is endemic to Laos.
