= Hon Tre bent-toed gecko =

Scientific classification
- Kingdom: Animalia
- Phylum: Chordata
- Class: Reptilia
- Order: Squamata
- Suborder: Gekkota
- Family: Gekkonidae
- Genus: Cyrtodactylus
- Species: C. hontreensis

Binomial name
- Cyrtodactylus hontreensis Tri, Grismer, & Grismer, 2008

Species of gecko endemic to Vietnam

The Hon Tre bent-toed gecko (Cyrtodactylus hontreensis) is a species of gecko that is endemic to Hon Tre Island in Vietnam.
