= Durian bent-toed gecko =

Scientific classification
- Kingdom: Animalia
- Phylum: Chordata
- Class: Reptilia
- Order: Squamata
- Suborder: Gekkota
- Family: Gekkonidae
- Genus: Cyrtodactylus
- Species: C. durio

Binomial name
- Cyrtodactylus durio Grismer, Anuar, Quah, Muin, Onn, Grismer & Ahmad, 2010

Species of lizard

The Durian bent-toed gecko (Cyrtodactylus durio) is a species of gecko that is endemic to peninsular Malaysia.
