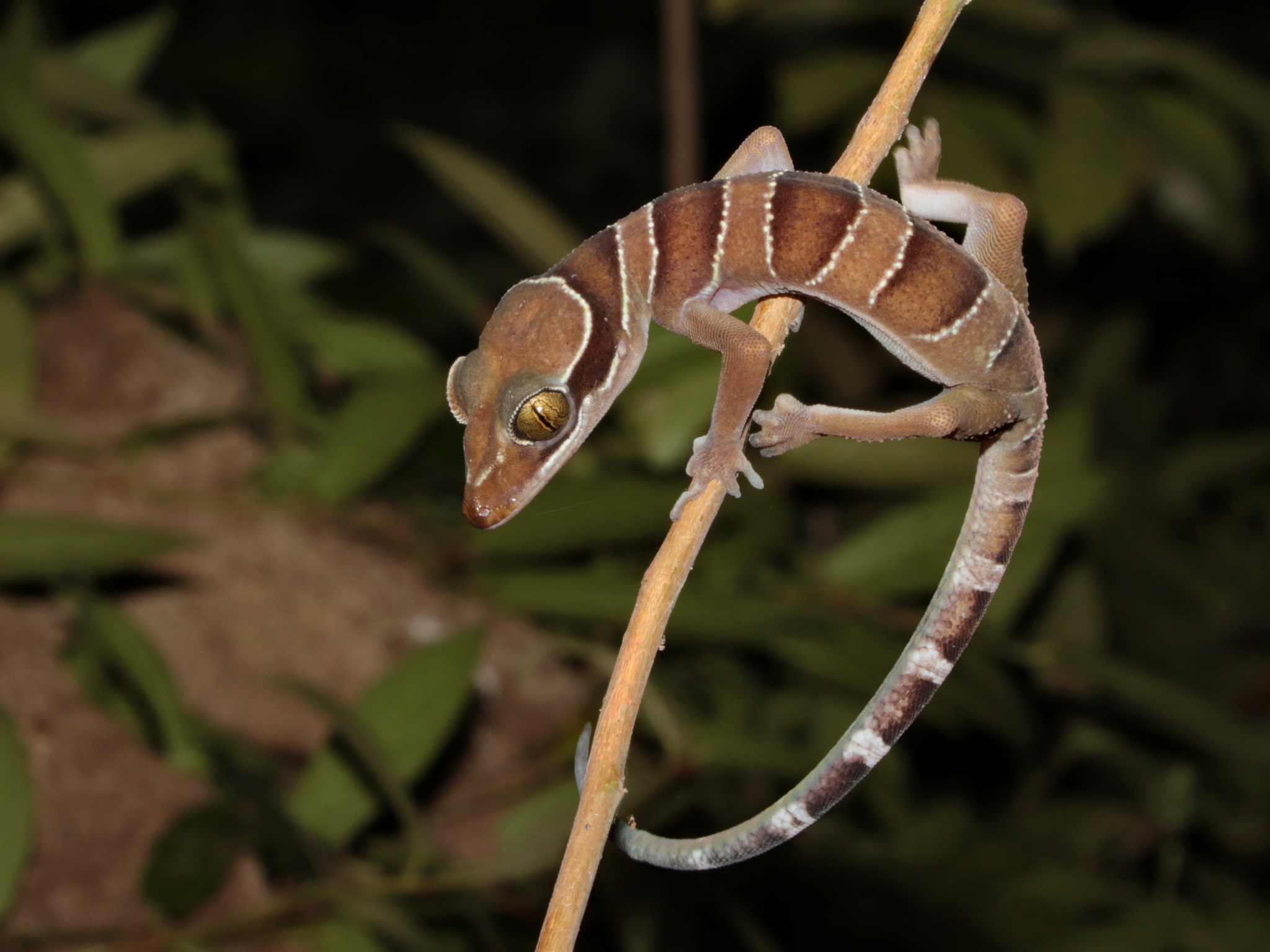

Scientific classification
- Kingdom: Animalia
- Phylum: Chordata
- Class: Reptilia
- Order: Squamata
- Suborder: Gekkota
- Family: Gekkonidae
- Genus: Cyrtodactylus
- Species: C. bintangrendah

Binomial name
- Cyrtodactylus bintangrendah Grismer et al.

= Bintang lowland bent-toed gecko =

Species of lizard

The Bintang lowland bent-toed gecko (Cyrtodactylus bintangrendah) is a species of gecko endemic to peninsular Malaysia and neighbouring areas of Thailand.
