= Bich Ngan's bent-toed gecko =

Conservation status
- Vulnerable (IUCN 3.1)

Scientific classification
- Kingdom: Animalia
- Phylum: Chordata
- Class: Reptilia
- Order: Squamata
- Suborder: Gekkota
- Family: Gekkonidae
- Genus: Cyrtodactylus
- Species: C. bichnganae

Binomial name
- Cyrtodactylus bichnganae Ngo & L. Grismer, 2010

Species of lizard

Bich Ngan's bent-toed gecko (Cyrtodactylus bichnganae) is a species of lizard in the family Gekkonidae. The species is endemic to Vietnam.

== Etymology ==
The specific name, bichnganae, is in honor of Ngo Hoang Bich Ngan, who is the daughter of senior binomial authority Ngo Van Tri.

== Geographic range ==
C. bichnganae is found in northwestern Vietnam, in Sơn La Province.

== Habitat ==
The preferred natural habitats of C. bichnganae are forest and rocky areas, at an altitude of 600 m (2,000 ft).

== Description ==
C. bichnganae may attain a snout-to-vent length (SVL) of 10 cm (3.9 in).
