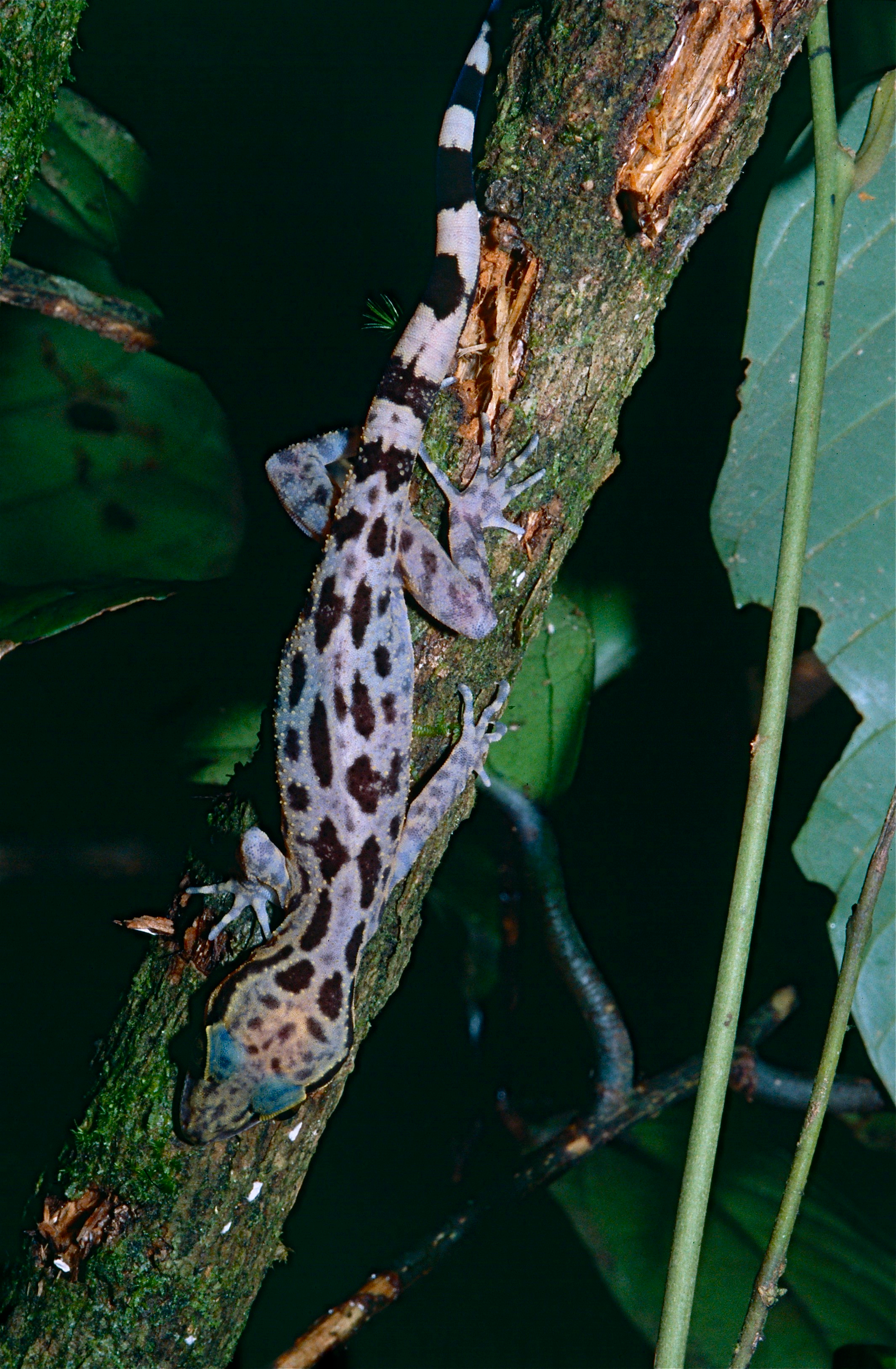

Conservation status
- Least Concern (IUCN 3.1)

Scientific classification
- Kingdom: Animalia
- Phylum: Chordata
- Class: Reptilia
- Order: Squamata
- Suborder: Gekkota
- Family: Gekkonidae
- Genus: Cyrtodactylus
- Species: C. pubisulcus

Binomial name
- Cyrtodactylus pubisulcus Inger, 1958

= Inger's bow-fingered gecko =

Species of lizard

Inger's bow-fingered gecko (Cyrtodactylus pubisulcus) is a species of gecko that is endemic to Borneo. It is known from Brunei, Sarawak (Malaysia), and West Kalimantan (Indonesia).
