= Cyrtodactylus muangfuangensis =

Scientific classification
- Kingdom: Animalia
- Phylum: Chordata
- Class: Reptilia
- Order: Squamata
- Suborder: Gekkota
- Family: Gekkonidae
- Genus: Cyrtodactylus
- Species: C. muangfuangensis

Binomial name
- Cyrtodactylus muangfuangensis Sitthivong, Luu, Ha, Nguyen, Le, & Ziegler, 2019

Species of lizard

Cyrtodactylus muangfuangensis, the Muangfuang bent-toed gecko, is a species of gecko endemic to central Laos.
