= Cyrtodactylus tripuraensis =

Scientific classification
- Kingdom: Animalia
- Phylum: Chordata
- Order: Squamata
- Suborder: Gekkota
- Family: Gekkonidae
- Genus: Cyrtodactylus
- Species: C. tripuraensis

Binomial name
- Cyrtodactylus tripuraensis Agarwal, Mahony, Giri, Chaitanya, & Bauer, 2018

Species of lizard

Cyrtodactylus tripuraensis is a species of gecko, belongs to the family Gekkonidae. This species is commonly known as Tripura Bent-toed Gecko and found only in Tripura, Northeast India and Bangladesh
