= Cyrtodactylus guwahatiensis =

Scientific classification
- Kingdom: Animalia
- Phylum: Chordata
- Order: Squamata
- Suborder: Gekkota
- Family: Gekkonidae
- Genus: Cyrtodactylus
- Species: C. guwahatiensis

Binomial name
- Cyrtodactylus guwahatiensis Agarwal, Mahony, Giri, Chaitanya, & Bauer, 2018

Species of lizard

Cyrtodactylus guwahatiensis is a species of gecko endemic to India.
