= Cyrtodactylus sonlaensis =

Scientific classification
- Kingdom: Animalia
- Phylum: Chordata
- Class: Reptilia
- Order: Squamata
- Suborder: Gekkota
- Family: Gekkonidae
- Genus: Cyrtodactylus
- Species: C. sonlaensis

Binomial name
- Cyrtodactylus sonlaensis Nguyen, Pham, Ziegler, Ngo, & Le, 2017

Species of lizard

Cyrtodactylus sonlaensis is a species of gecko that is endemic to northwestern Vietnam.
