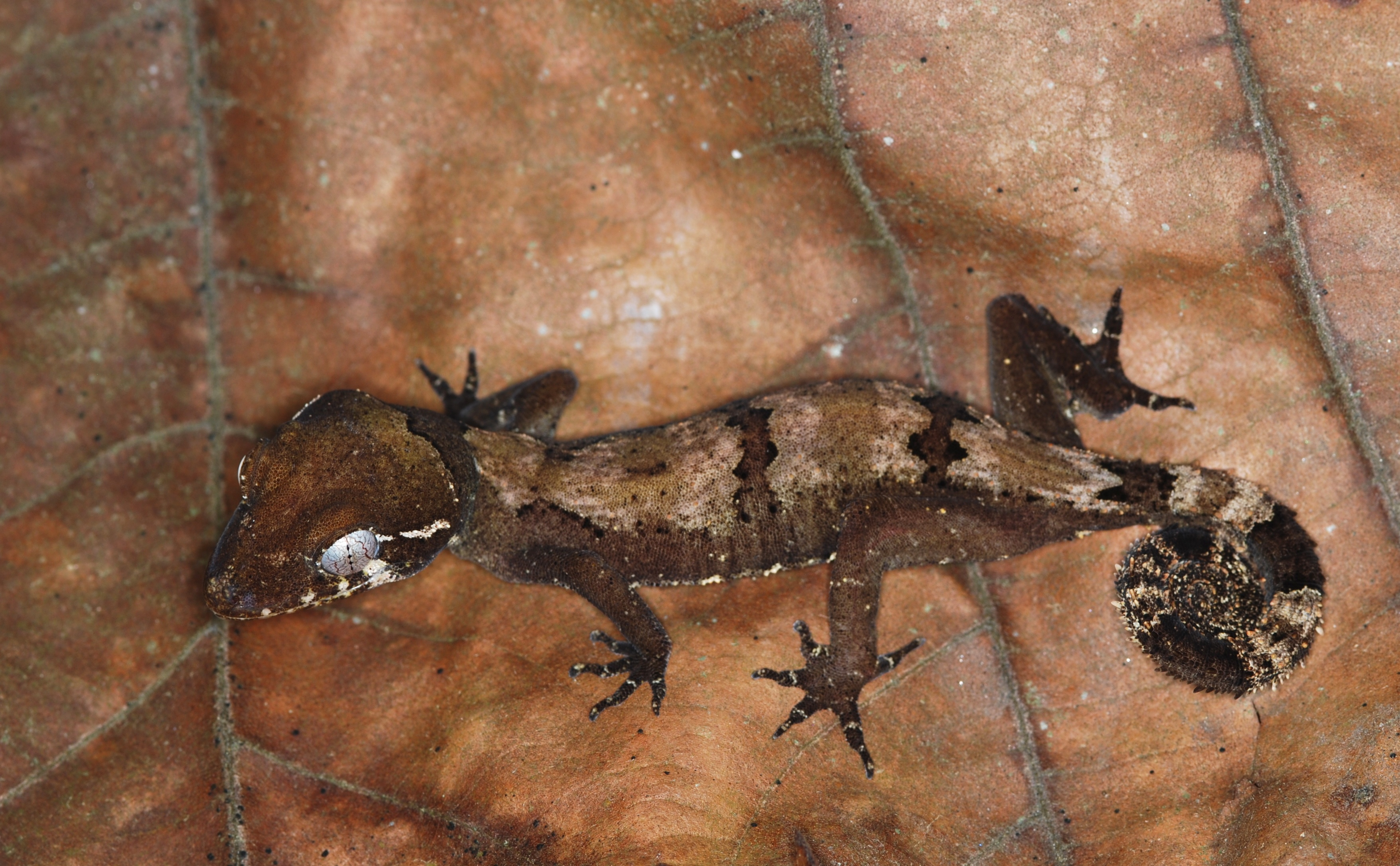

Scientific classification
- Domain: Eukaryota
- Kingdom: Animalia
- Phylum: Chordata
- Class: Reptilia
- Order: Squamata
- Infraorder: Gekkota
- Family: Gekkonidae
- Genus: Cyrtodactylus
- Species: C. elok

Binomial name
- Cyrtodactylus elok Dring, 1979

= Cyrtodactylus elok =

Species of lizard

Cyrtodactylus elok, also known as the Malaysia bow-fingered gecko, white-eyed forest gecko, or beautiful bent-toed gecko, is a species of gecko that is endemic to southern Thailand and western Malaysia.
