= Cyrtodactylus semiadii =

Scientific classification
- Kingdom: Animalia
- Phylum: Chordata
- Class: Reptilia
- Order: Squamata
- Suborder: Gekkota
- Family: Gekkonidae
- Genus: Cyrtodactylus
- Species: C. semiadii

Binomial name
- Cyrtodactylus semiadii Riyanto, Bauer & Yudha, 2014

Species of lizard

Cyrtodactylus semiadii is a species of gecko, a lizard in the family Gekkonidae. The species is endemic to Java.

== Etymology ==
The specific name, semiadii, is in honor of Indonesian mammalogist Gono Semiadi.

== Geographic range ==
C. semiadii is found in the eastern part of the island of Java, in the province of East Java.

== Description ==
C. semiadii is a small species for its genus, having a maximum snout-to-vent length (SVL) of 47 mm (1.9 in) for males and 42 mm (1.7 in) for females.

== Reproduction ==
The mode of reproduction of C. semiadii is unknown.
