= Derongo bow-fingered gecko =

Conservation status
- Data Deficient (IUCN 3.1)

Scientific classification
- Kingdom: Animalia
- Phylum: Chordata
- Class: Reptilia
- Order: Squamata
- Suborder: Gekkota
- Family: Gekkonidae
- Genus: Cyrtodactylus
- Species: C. derongo

Binomial name
- Cyrtodactylus derongo Brown & Parker, 1973

Species of lizard

The Derongo bow-fingered gecko (Cyrtodactylus derongo) is a species of gecko that is endemic to Papua New Guinea.
