= Butterfly forest gecko =

Scientific classification
- Kingdom: Animalia
- Phylum: Chordata
- Class: Reptilia
- Order: Squamata
- Suborder: Gekkota
- Family: Gekkonidae
- Genus: Cyrtodactylus
- Species: C. papilionoides

Binomial name
- Cyrtodactylus papilionoides Ulber & Grossmann, 1991

Synonyms
- Cyrtodactylus papilionoides Ulber & Grossmann, 1991; Cyrtodactylus papilionoides — Chan-ard et al. 1999; Cyrtodactylus (Cyrtodactylus) papilionoides — Rösler 2000

Species of lizard

The butterfly forest gecko (Cyrtodactylus papilionoides) is a species of gecko endemic to Thailand.
