= Cyrtodactylus cucphuongensis =

Scientific classification
- Kingdom: Animalia
- Phylum: Chordata
- Class: Reptilia
- Order: Squamata
- Suborder: Gekkota
- Family: Gekkonidae
- Genus: Cyrtodactylus
- Species: C. cucphuongensis

Binomial name
- Cyrtodactylus cucphuongensis Ngo & Onn, 2011

Species of lizard

Cyrtodactylus cucphuongensis is a species of gecko that is endemic to Vietnam.
