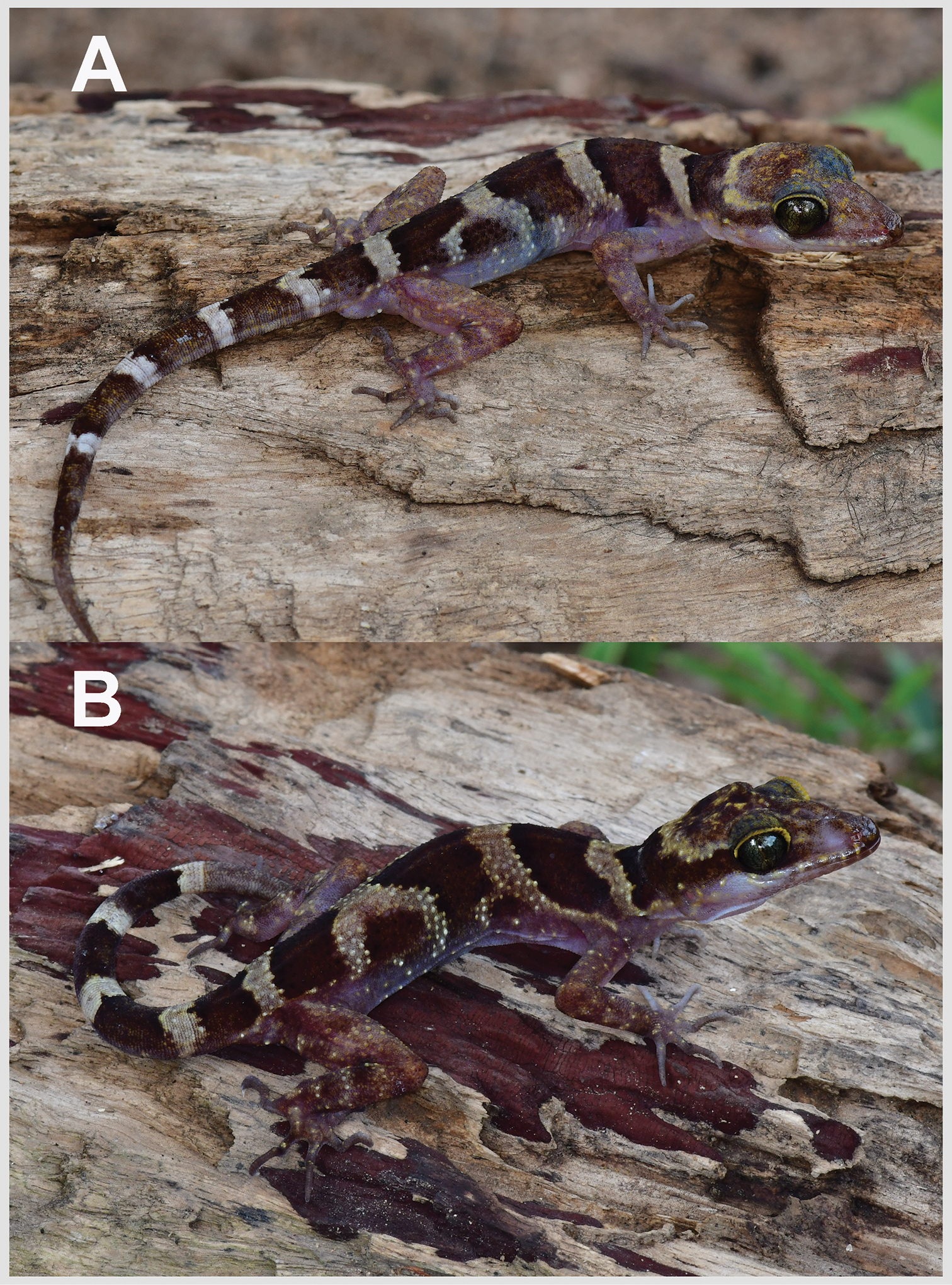
- A: Male holotype and B: female paratype

Scientific classification
- Kingdom: Animalia
- Phylum: Chordata
- Class: Reptilia
- Order: Squamata
- Suborder: Gekkota
- Family: Gekkonidae
- Genus: Cyrtodactylus
- Species: C. phnomchiensis

Binomial name
- Cyrtodactylus phnomchiensis Nyang, Henson & Stuart, 2020

= Cyrtodactylus phnomchiensis =

Species of lizard

Cyrtodactylus phnomchiensis is a species of gecko that is endemic to Cambodia.
