= Lomyen bent-toed gecko =

Scientific classification
- Kingdom: Animalia
- Phylum: Chordata
- Class: Reptilia
- Order: Squamata
- Suborder: Gekkota
- Family: Gekkonidae
- Genus: Cyrtodactylus
- Species: C. lomyenensis

Binomial name
- Cyrtodactylus lomyenensis Tri & Pauwels, 2010

Species of lizard

The Lomyen bent-toed gecko (Cyrtodactylus lomyenensis) is a species of gecko that is endemic to central Laos.
