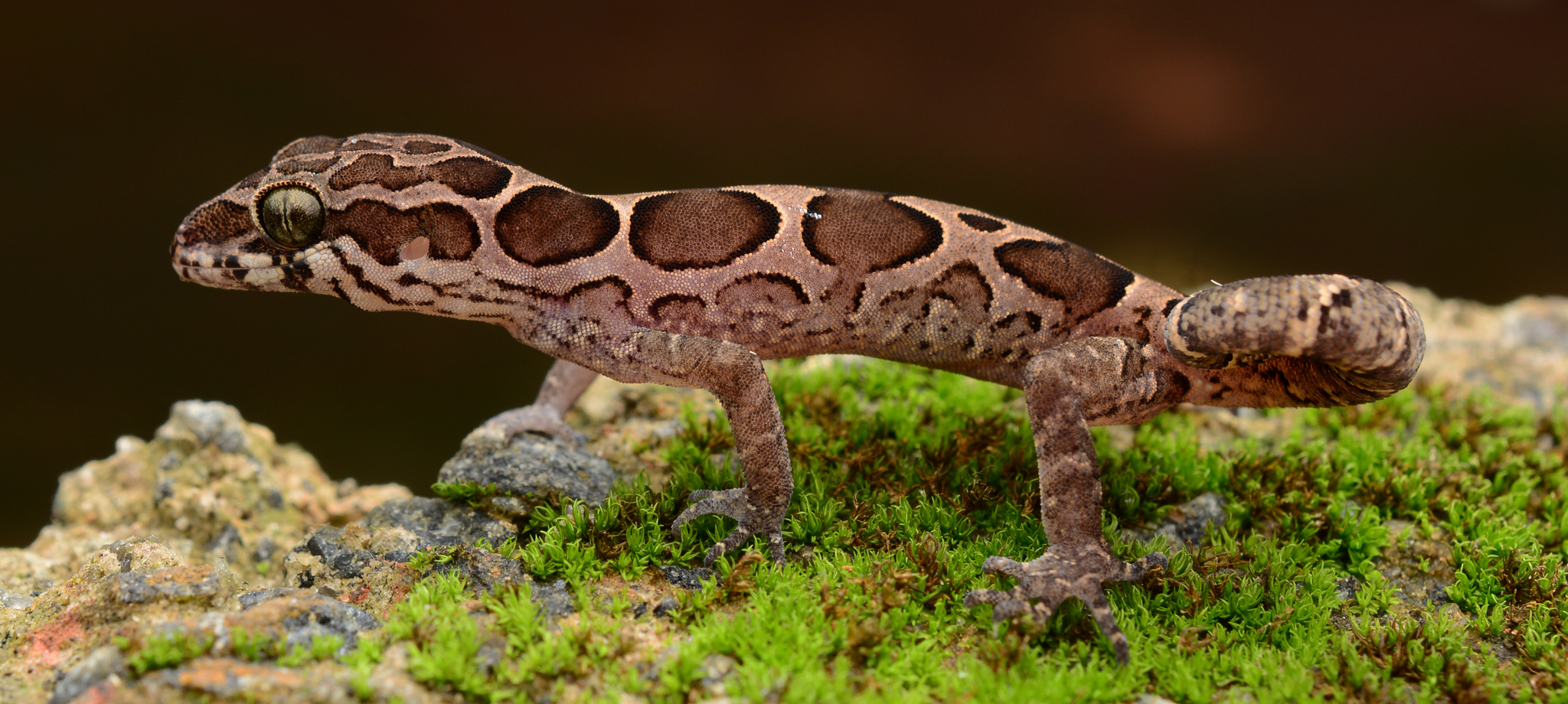

Scientific classification
- Kingdom: Animalia
- Phylum: Chordata
- Class: Reptilia
- Order: Squamata
- Suborder: Gekkota
- Family: Gekkonidae
- Genus: Cyrtodactylus
- Species: C. chengodumalaensis

Binomial name
- Cyrtodactylus chengodumalaensis Agarwal, Umesh, Das, & Bauer, 2023

= Cyrtodactylus chengodumalaensis =

Coastal kerala geckoella

Cyrtodactylus chengodumalaensis, the Chengodumala geckoella or Coastal Kerala geckoella, is a species of gecko endemic to Kerala.
