= Cyrtodactylus taybacensis =

Scientific classification
- Kingdom: Animalia
- Phylum: Chordata
- Class: Reptilia
- Order: Squamata
- Suborder: Gekkota
- Family: Gekkonidae
- Genus: Cyrtodactylus
- Species: C. taybacensis

Binomial name
- Cyrtodactylus taybacensis Pham, Le, Ngo, Ziegler, & Nguyen, 2019

Species of gecko

Cyrtodactylus taybacensis, also known as the Taybac bent-toed gecko, is a species of gecko endemic to Vietnam.
