= Guadalcanal bow-fingered gecko =

Conservation status
- Least Concern (IUCN 3.1)

Scientific classification
- Kingdom: Animalia
- Phylum: Chordata
- Class: Reptilia
- Order: Squamata
- Suborder: Gekkota
- Family: Gekkonidae
- Genus: Cyrtodactylus
- Species: C. biordinis

Binomial name
- Cyrtodactylus biordinis Brown & McCoy, 1980
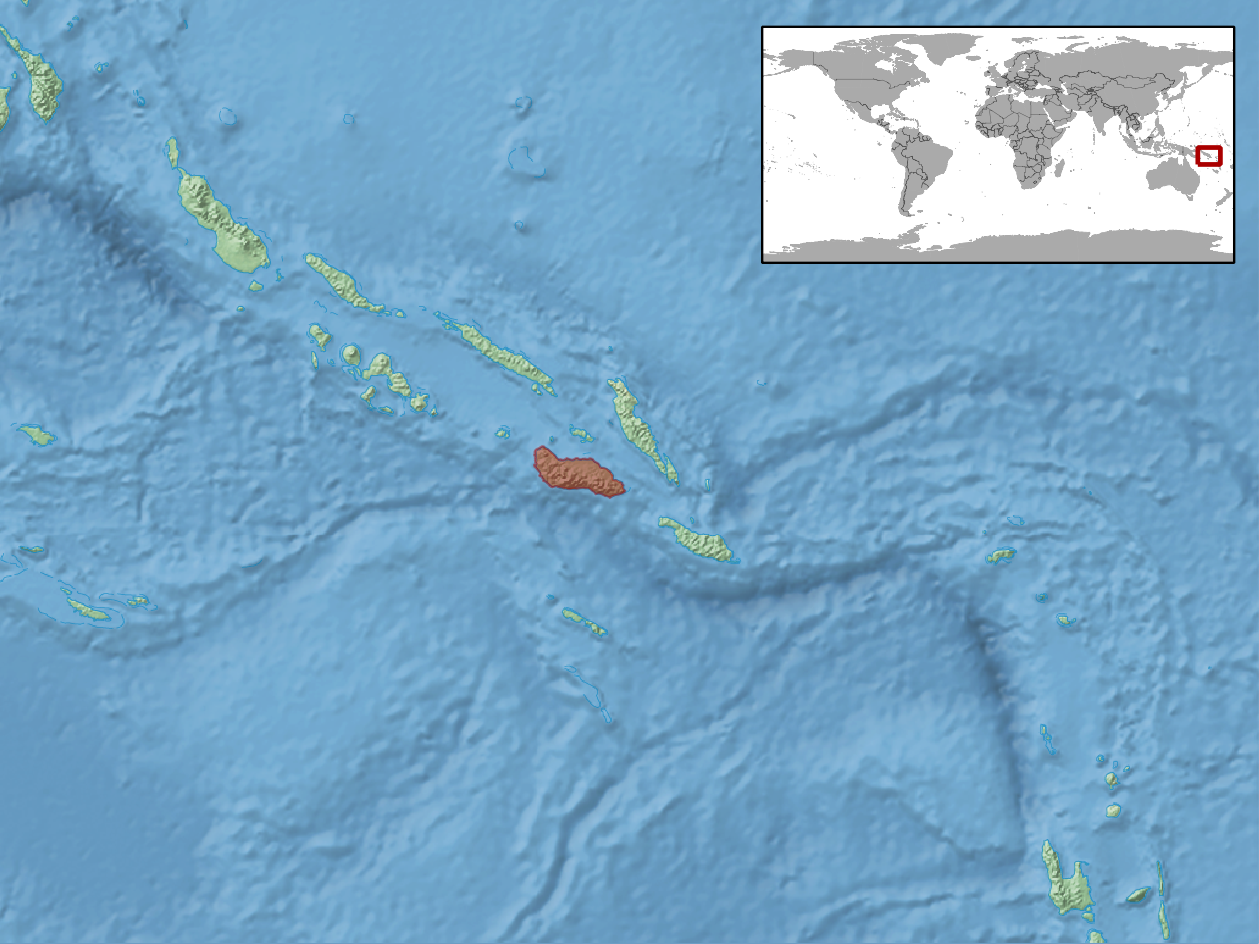

Synonyms
- Gonydactylus biordinis

Species of lizard

The Guadalcanal bow-fingered gecko (Cyrtodactylus biordinis) is a species of gecko endemic to Guadalcanal in the Solomon Islands.
