= Tambora bent-toed gecko =

Scientific classification
- Kingdom: Animalia
- Phylum: Chordata
- Class: Reptilia
- Order: Squamata
- Suborder: Gekkota
- Family: Gekkonidae
- Genus: Cyrtodactylus
- Species: C. tambora

Binomial name
- Cyrtodactylus tambora Riyanto, Mulyadi, McGuire, Kusrini, Febylasmia, Basyir, & Kaiser, 2017

Species of lizard

The Tambora bent-toed gecko (Cyrtodactylus tambora) is a species of gecko that is endemic to Sumbawa in Indonesia.
