= Cyrtodactylus hekouensis =

Scientific classification
- Domain: Eukaryota
- Kingdom: Animalia
- Phylum: Chordata
- Class: Reptilia
- Order: Squamata
- Infraorder: Gekkota
- Family: Gekkonidae
- Genus: Cyrtodactylus
- Species: C. hekouensis

Binomial name
- Cyrtodactylus hekouensis Zhang, Liu, Bernstein, Wang, & Yuan, 2021

Species of lizard

Cyrtodactylus hekouensis, the Hekou bent-toed gecko, is a species of gecko endemic to Yunnan Province, China.

It was first described in 2021, in Daweishan National Nature Reserve.
