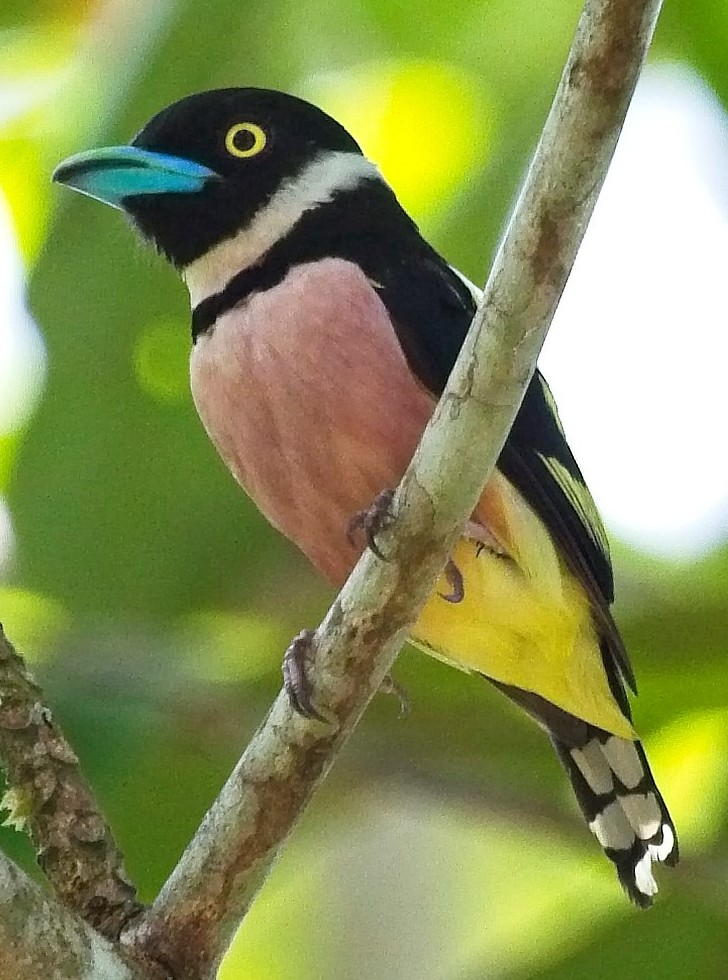
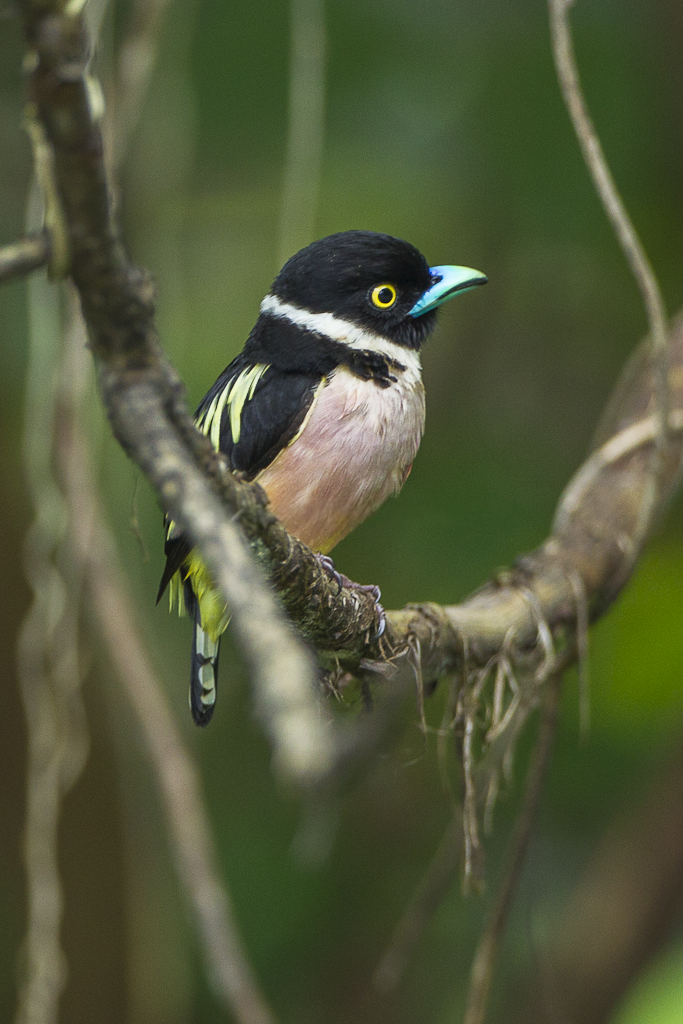
- Male, female

Conservation status
- Near Threatened (IUCN 3.1)

Scientific classification
- Kingdom: Animalia
- Phylum: Chordata
- Class: Aves
- Order: Passeriformes
- Family: Eurylaimidae
- Genus: Eurylaimus
- Species: E. ochromalus

Binomial name
- Eurylaimus ochromalus Raffles, 1822
- Black-and-yellow broadbill distribution

Synonyms
- Eurylaimus ochromalus mecistus (Oberholser, 1912); Eurylaimus ochromalus kalamantan (Robinson and Kloss, 1919); Eurylaimus cucullatus (Temminck, 1824); Eurylaimus Rafflesii (Lesson, 1837)

= Black-and-yellow broadbill =

Species of bird from Southeast Asia

The black-and-yellow broadbill (Eurylaimus ochromalus) is a species of bird in the typical broadbill family Eurylaimidae. A small, distinctive species, it has a black head, breastband, and upperparts, a white neckband, yellow streaking on the back and wings, and vinous-pink underparts that turn yellow towards the belly. The beak is bright blue, with a green tip to the upper mandible and black edges. It shows some sexual dimorphism, with the black breastband being incomplete in females.

Native to Brunei, Indonesia, Malaysia, Myanmar, Singapore, and Thailand, it inhabits evergreen forest, dipterocarp forest, swamp forest, heath forest, and forest edge, along with secondary forest and plantations that contain large trees. Mainly inhabiting lowlands, the species is found up to elevations of 1,220 m (4,000 ft). The black-and-yellow broadbill is mainly insectivorous, but also feeds on molluscs and incidentally takes fruit.

The black-and-yellow broadbill breeds during the dry season throughout its range, with both sexes helping build a large, untidy, pear-shaped nest out of moss, fungal mycelia, and leaves. Eggs are laid in clutches of two or three, sometimes containing a fourth runt egg, and are incubated by both sexes. The species is listed as near-threatened by the IUCN because of a decline in its population caused by habitat loss.

== Taxonomy and systematics ==
The black-and-yellow broadbill was described as Eurylaimus ochromalus by the British naturalist Stamford Raffles in 1822 based on specimens from Singapore. The generic name Eurylaimus comes from the Ancient Greek ευρυς (eurus), meaning broad, and λαιμος (laimos), meaning throat. The specific name ochromalus may come from either the Greek ōkhros, meaning pale yellow, and melas, meaning black, or ōkhromelas, meaning jaundiced. Black-and-yellow broadbill is the official common name designated by the International Ornithologists' Union. Other common names for the species include black and white broadbill, black and yellow broadbill, and black-yellow broadbill. The species is called takau kasturi in Malay, Nok Phaya Paak Kwaang lek in Thai, and curɔɔw in Temiar.

The black-and-yellow broadbill is one of two species currently placed in the genus Eurylaimus, in the typical broadbill family Eurylamidae, a family of ten tropical species native to Southeast Asia. Based on a 2017 study by the Brazilian researcher Alexandre Selvatti and colleagues, its closest relative is the banded broadbill. These two species are most closely related to a clade formed by the black-and-red and silver-breasted broadbills, and all three genera form a sister clade to the genus Sarcophanops. This clade is sister to one formed by the long-tailed broadbill and dusky broadbill. Both of these clades are sister to Grauer's broadbill. An earlier 2006 study by Robert Moyle and colleagues also found strong support for these relationships, but did not sample the wattled broadbill. The following cladogram shows phylogenetic relationships among the Eurylaimidae, based on the 2017 study: (Note: The study did not include the Visayan broadbill, which was formerly considered conspecific with the wattled broadbill. Additionally, it treated the grey-lored broadbill as being conspecific with the silver-breasted broadbill.)

- Eurylaimidae
  - Grauer's broadbill (Pseudocalyptomena graueri)
  - - - Long-tailed broadbill (Psarisomus dalhousiae)
      - Dusky broadbill (Corydon sumatranus)
    - - Wattled broadbill (Sarcophanops steerii)
      - - - Silver-breasted broadbill (Serilophus lunatus)
          - Black-and-red broadbill (Cymbirhynchus macrorhynchos)
        - - Banded broadbill (Eurylaimus javanicus)
          - Black-and-yellow broadbill (Eurylaimus ochromalus)

No subspecies of the black-and-yellow broadbill are currently recognised, but populations from the Banyak Islands and West Borneo have sometimes been treated as distinct subspecies named E. o. mecistus and E. o. kalamantan, respectively. However, all of the species' populations show significant variation in appearance between individuals, making the recognition of subspecies inadvisable.

== Description ==
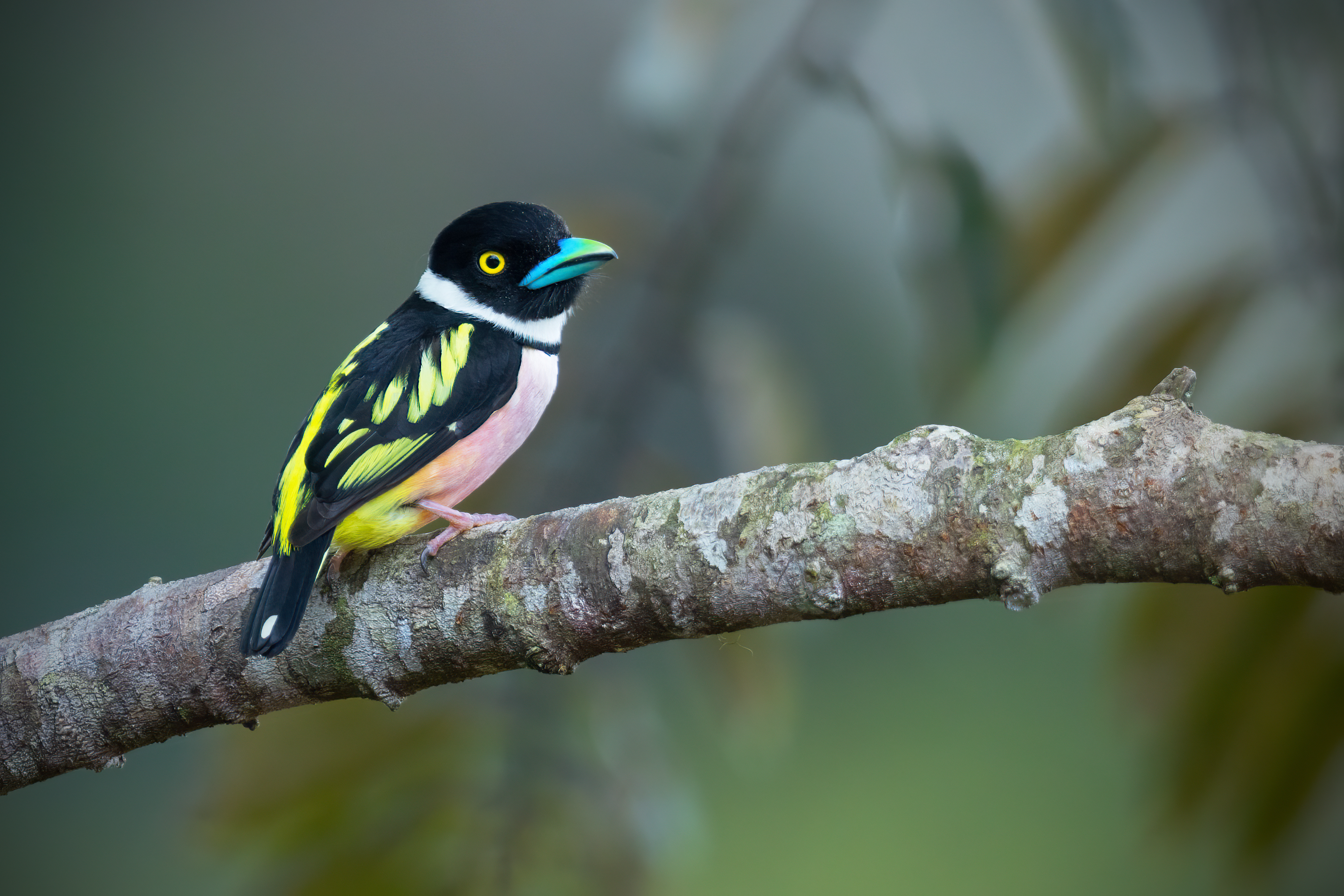
Male, showing tail spot

The black-and-yellow broadbill is a small, distinctive species of typical broadbill that is 13.5–15 cm (5.3–5.9 in) long and weighs 31–39 g (1.1–1.4 oz). Males have black heads and upperparts with a white collar and black breastband, along with prominent yellow markings on the back and wings. The underparts are vinous-pink, fading to yellow towards the belly and undertail coverts (tail feathers that cover the underside of the base of the tail). The tail is black, with yellow spots on the middle feathers and whiter ones on the outer feathers. The iris is pale yellow, while the bill is bright blue, with a green tip to the upper mandible and black edges. The base of the bill lacks bristles, which are present in some other species of broadbills. The legs are reddish, with long tarsometatarsi. The species shows some sexual dimorphism, with females having a gap in the centre of the black breastband. Juveniles lack a well-defined breastband and have a pale yellow supercilium (a stripe running from the beak to above the eye) with grayish-white underparts.

Reddish colours in the plumage of the black-and-yellow broadbill are caused by the biological pigment 2,3-didehydro-papilioerythrinone, which is also present in the feathers of the banded broadbill, black-and-red broadbill, and Sarcophanops species. The yellow in the species' plumage is caused by the carotenoid 7,8-dihydro-3′-dehydro-lutein, which is also present in the plumage of the banded broadbill.

Like other typical broadbills, the black-and-yellow broadbill has a large, wide bill that is thought to have first evolved in the common ancestor of all broadbills as an adaptation to an insectivorous diet. Its large and fleshy tongue helps manipulate objects inside its beak, allowing it to mash food against the inside of the beak to "chew" it.

=== Vocalisations ===
The black-and-yellow broadbill's song is a cicada-like bubbling trill that starts with a few sharp downslurred notes before rising in pitch and gradually speeding up into an 8–12 second long low, quivering trill. This song is similar to that of a banded broadbill, but is longer, accelerates more slowly, lacks an initial whistle, and ends suddenly. This song is given by a pair of birds, often calling alternately, while other individuals with the calling pair have been recorded giving a shrill, mournful peep. Other calls include a kor kor kor made by nesting males and a squeaky kyeeow.

Black-and-yellow broadbills have been also observed singing and counter-singing (singing in response to another bird) when close to other individuals, interspersing their songs with a throaty keowrr. The latter calls are also occasionally used during aggressive confrontations.

== Distribution and habitat ==
The black-and-yellow broadbill is found in Malaysia, Thailand, Myanmar, Singapore, and Brunei. In Indonesia, it is found on the Riau Islands and the Lingga Islands, as well as on Borneo, Sumatra, Bangka Island, Belitung, and the Natuna Islands. It inhabits evergreen forest, mixed dipterocarp forest, fresh water and coastal swamp forests, heath forest, and forest edges, along with secondary forest and plantations, such as those of cocoa, rubber, and Albizia. Its presence in secondary forest and plantations depends on those areas having large remnant trees. The species is mostly found in lowlands, occurring at elevations up to 700 m (2,300 ft) in the Malay Peninsula, 900 m (3,000 ft) in Sumatra, and 1,220 m (4,000 ft) in Borneo.

== Behaviour and ecology ==
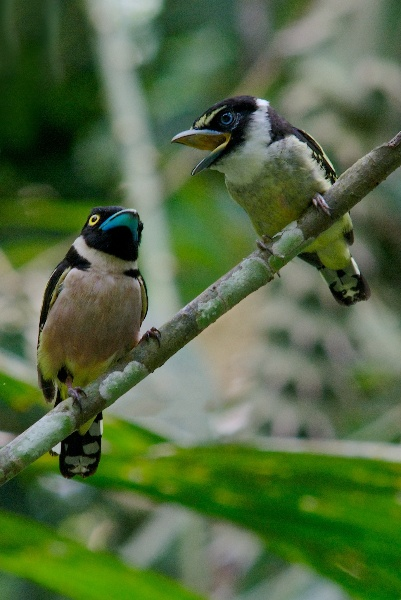
Female adult and juvenile

Black-and-yellow broadbills have been recorded performing wing displays, in which they raise their wings, generally slightly over the back, and then slowly open and close their flight feathers. Occasionally, the displays are performed with only one wing, followed by tail wags, or accompanied by gaping displays in which the beak is steadily opened and closed. These displays have been observed after singing, in response to playback, and after foraging.

Black-and-yellow broadbills have been reported occasionally gathering in groups of up to five birds, although groups larger than pairs or pairs with young are not regular. In spite of frequent confrontational behaviour like counter-singing, they display a high tolerance for other individuals in their territories or close by, with aggressive behaviour such as chasing seldom being observed. However, pairs have been observed confronting each other to defend their territory by bowing their heads and vocalising before attacking each other.

=== Feeding ===
The black-and-yellow broadbill mainly feeds on insects, including orthopterans (grasshoppers, crickets, and locusts), mantises, beetles, hymenopterans (ants, wasps, sawflies, and bees), flies, winged termites, and caterpillars. It has also been recorded feeding on molluscs, along with incidental consumption of fruit. In Borneo, the orthopterans consumed by the black-and-yellow broadbill are smaller than those eaten by the closely related banded broadbill.

The black-and-yellow broadbill forages in the middle and upper layers of forest in scattered flocks of ten to fifteen. Individual birds feeding on exposed perches in the canopy may be acting as lookouts for larger, more dispersed flocks. Foraging is mostly done by looking for prey from perches, seizing prey from leaf surfaces in flight during short sallies. Aerial insects are also sometimes caught in midair, and it has been observed holding on the tree trunks like a woodpecker. The species also sallies into termite swarms in a drongo-like manner. Black-and-yellow broadbills have also been recorded occasionally joining mixed-species foraging flocks.

=== Breeding ===
The black-and-yellow broadbill's breeding season starts with the arrival of the dry season and varies widely throughout its range: from February to October on the Malay Peninsula, from January to July on Sumatra, and from March to August on Borneo. Wing displays have been observed being performed by both sexes before mating.

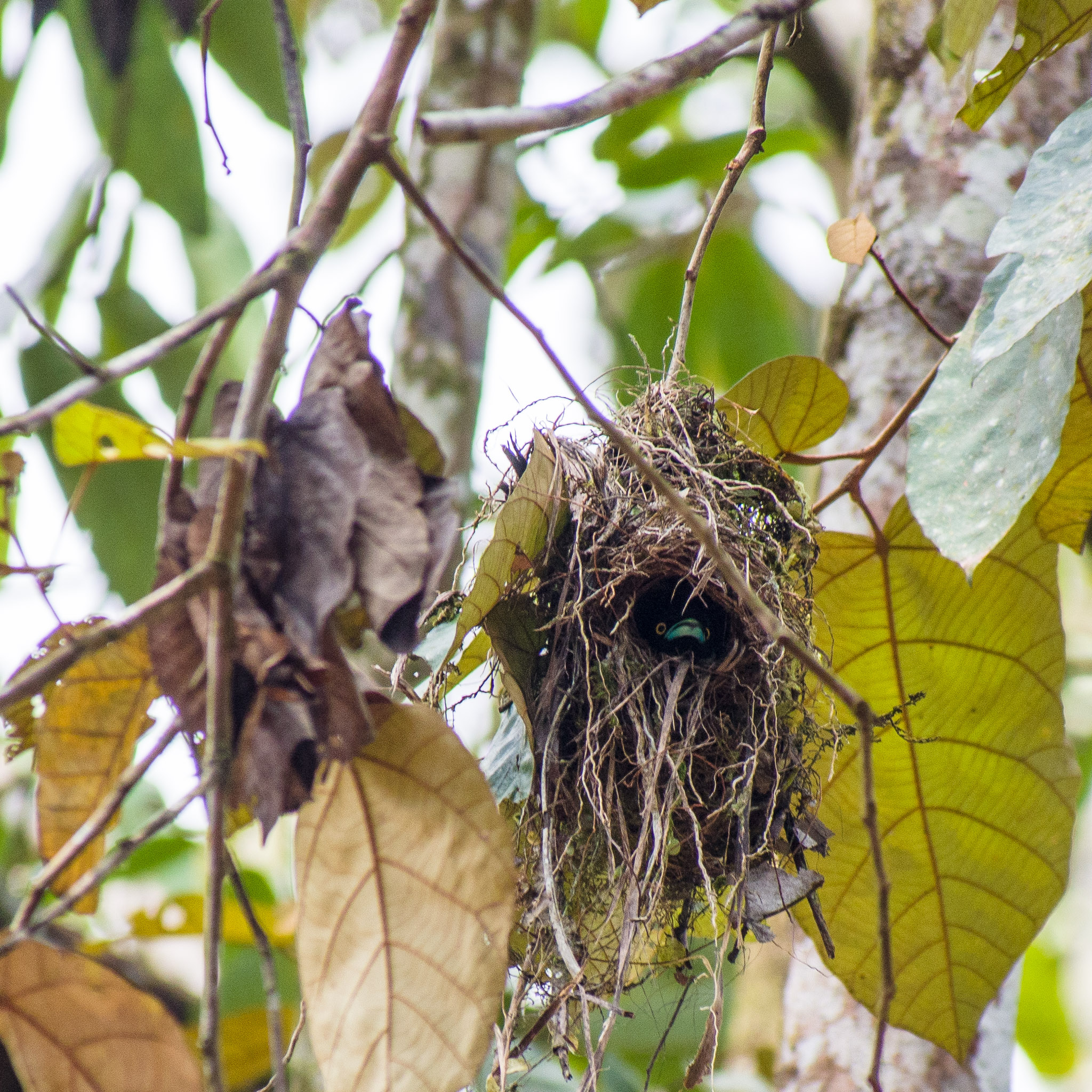
Black-and-yellow broadbill at nest

The nest is a large, untidy, and pear-shaped hanging structure made of moss, fungal mycelia, and leaves, lined inside with grass roots, bamboo leaves, and leaf stalks. Nests are built by both sexes and are typically located at the edges of clearings or above streams in obstacle-free sites. The measurements of one nest were 17 cm × 13 cm × 10 cm (6.7 in × 5.1 in × 3.9 in) in size, with walls 3.8 cm (1.5 in) thick and an entrance 5 cm × 6.4 cm (2.0 in × 2.5 in) wide. The nest is generally suspended from branches or other appropriate locations 5–18 m (16–59 ft) above the ground, and is attached with loops made of grass, twigs, or cane grass. Nest construction sometimes continues after the laying of eggs. In Borneo, nests are sometimes placed close to beehives, which may provide either protection for the nest or a food source. Nests are occasionally partially hidden by leaves, but some may be conspicuously located.

Other species of Asian broadbills have been reported breeding cooperatively, but no helpers have been observed near black-and-yellow broadbill nests. A full clutch consists of two or three eggs, but some clutches contain an additional fourth runt egg. Eggs measure 22.9 mm–24.1 mm × 17.4 mm–19.7 mm (0.90 in–0.95 in × 0.69 in–0.78 in) in size and are oval-shaped with a slightly pointed narrow end. They are off-white to fawn pink with variable brown to purplish-brown flecking and underlying light purple spots. The flecking and spots occur all over the egg but are densest in a band around the broader end. Incubation is performed by both parents. The time period taken to incubate eggs and for chicks to fledge is not known.

The Indian cuckoo has been recorded as a brood parasite of the species, which may also be parasitised by other species of cuckoos. In Borneo, black-and-yellow broadbills have also been observed defending their nest from Prevost's squirrels who were foraging on a nearby vine.

=== Parasites ===
In Thailand, the black-and-yellow broadbill has been recorded being parasitised by the chewing louse Guimaraesiella latirostris, of which it is the type host. It has also been recorded as a host of the mite Harpypalpus holopus, although this is a doubtful record.

== Status ==
The black-and-yellow broadbill is listed as being near-threatened by the International Union for Conservation of Nature (IUCN) on the IUCN Red List. Its population is thought to be declining fairly quickly due to habitat loss caused by logging, land conversion, and wildfires. The effect of habitat loss on the species may have been reduced due to its tolerance of secondary forest. It was previously common throughout its range and is still locally common in areas with suitable habitat. It is likely to survive in the long-term only in protected areas and higher-lying forests in spite of its tolerance of degraded habitat.
