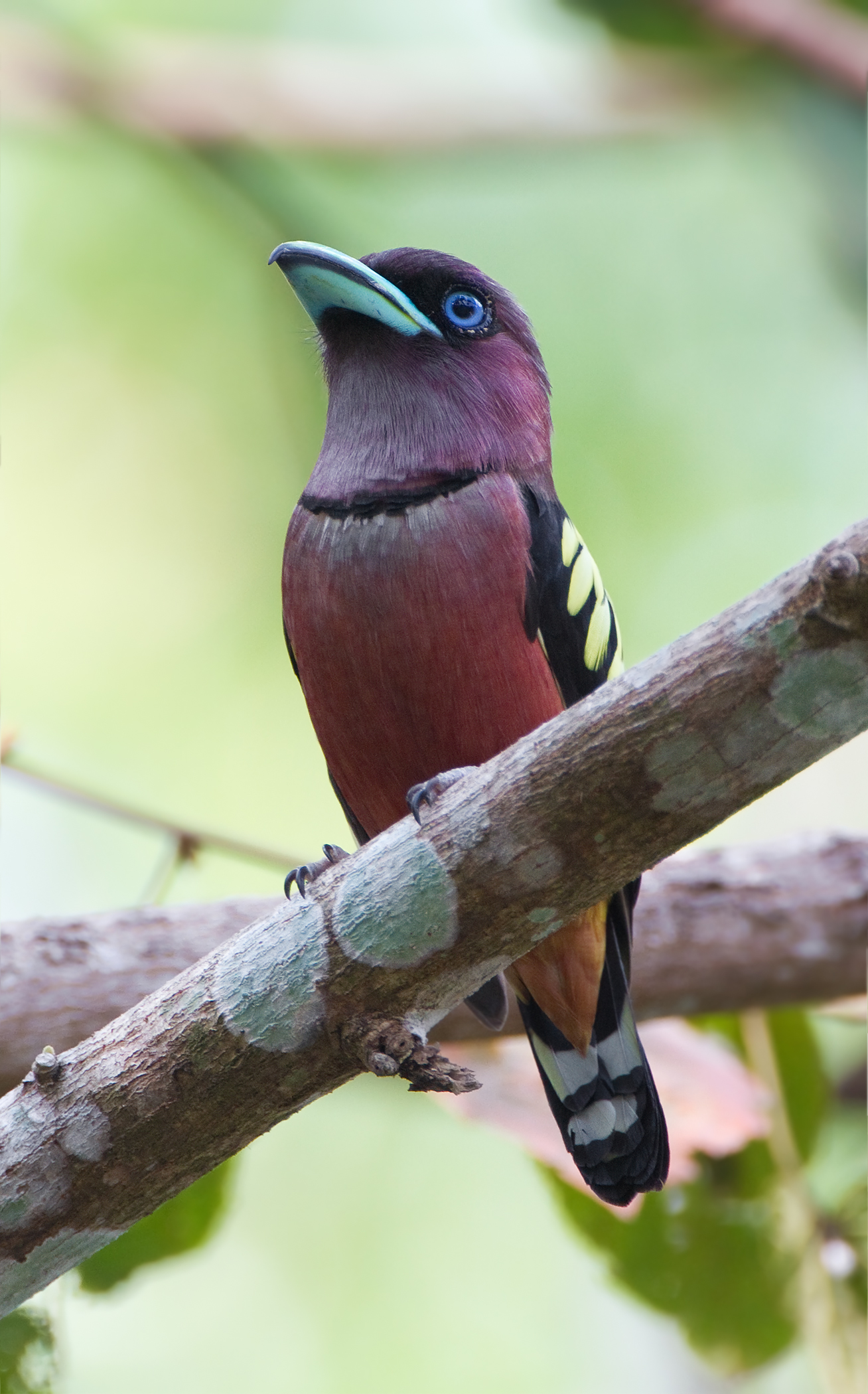
- Male of the subspecies pallidus

Conservation status
- Near Threatened (IUCN 3.1)

Scientific classification
- Kingdom: Animalia
- Phylum: Chordata
- Class: Aves
- Order: Passeriformes
- Family: Eurylaimidae
- Genus: Eurylaimus
- Species: E. javanicus

Binomial name
- Eurylaimus javanicus Horsfield, 1821
- Range of the banded broadbill; nominate subspecies in light green and other subspecies in dark green

Synonyms
- Eurylaimus Javanicus Horsfield, 1821; Eurylaimus horsfieldii (Temminck, 1823); Eurylaimus javanicus billitonis (Kloss, 1931); Eurylaimus javanicus friedmanni (Deignan, 1947)

= Banded broadbill =

Species of bird from Southeast Asia

The banded broadbill (Eurylaimus javanicus) is a species of bird in the typical broadbill family Eurylaimidae found in Mainland Southeast Asia and the Greater Sunda Islands. It is sometimes split into two species, one including only the nominate subspecies, E. j. javanicus, and one including all the remaining subspecies. It inhabits a variety of forests, along with forest edge, rubber plantations and Falcataria falcata groves, mainly in lowland areas. A striking, large-bodied bird with a length of 21.5–23.0 cm (8.5–9.1 in), it is unlikely to be mistaken for another species. The broadbill is mostly purplish-red, with yellow-streaked black wings, a bright blue beak, a blackish face and greyish chin and upper breast. Females can be told apart from males by their lack of a black neckband, although these are indistinct in Bornean and Javan males. Despite its conspicuous appearance, the bird is usually hard to see due to its sluggishness and is usually only noticed when it vocalises.

The species mainly eats arthropods such as orthopterans (grasshoppers, katydids and crickets), true bugs and beetles, but has also been recorded feeding on snails, lizards, frogs and figs. On the mainland, breeding generally occurs during the dry season; populations in the Greater Sundas have a longer breeding season lasting from March to November. On Java, the broadbill is thought to breed year-round. Their large, raggedy nests are hung from trees at a height of 6–21 m (20–69 ft) over clearings or water bodies. Clutches have two or three eggs. The eggs are usually dull white with dark purple or reddish-brown flecks, but those from West Java are dirty white with dense rusty-brown to lavender-grey markings. The International Union for Conservation of Nature, which splits the banded broadbill into two species, classifies javanicus as being near-threatened and the other subspecies as being of least concern.

== Taxonomy and systematics ==
The banded broadbill was described as Eurylaimus javanicus by the American naturalist Thomas Horsfield in 1821 based on specimens from Java. It is the type species of the genus Eurylaimus, which was created for it. The name of the genus, Eurylaimus, derives from the Ancient Greek ευρυς, eurus, meaning broad, and λαιμος, laimos, meaning throat. The specific name javanicus comes from Java, the island on which it was discovered. Banded broadbill is the official common name designated by the International Ornithologists' Union (IOU). Another common name for the species is Javan broadbill. The species is called takau rimba in Malay and Nok Phaya Paak Kwaang laay leuang in Thai.

The banded broadbill is one of two species currently placed in the genus Eurylaimus, in the typical broadbill family Eurylaimidae, a family of ten tropical species native to Southeast Asia. Based on a 2017 study by the Brazilian researcher Alexandre Selvatti and colleagues, its closest relative is the black-and-yellow broadbill. These two species are most closely related to a clade formed by the black-and-red and silver-breasted broadbills, and all three genera form a sister clade to the genus Sarcophanops. This larger clade is sister to one formed by the long-tailed broadbill and dusky broadbill. Both of these clades are sister to Grauer's broadbill. The following cladogram shows phylogenetic relationships among the Eurylaimidae, based on the above study: (Note: The study did not include the Visayan broadbill, which was formerly considered conspecific with the wattled broadbill. Additionally, it treated the grey-lored broadbill as being conspecific with the silver-breasted broadbill.)

- Eurylaimidae
  - Grauer's broadbill (Pseudocalyptomena graueri)
  - - - Long-tailed broadbill (Psarisomus dalhousiae)
      - Dusky broadbill (Corydon sumatranus)
    - - Wattled broadbill (Sarcophanops steerii)
      - - - Silver-breasted broadbill (Serilophus lunatus)
          - Black-and-red broadbill (Cymbirhynchus macrorhynchos)
        - - Banded broadbill (Eurylaimus javanicus)
          - Black-and-yellow broadbill (Eurylaimus ochromalus)

Four subspecies of the banded broadbill are currently recognised by the IOU:

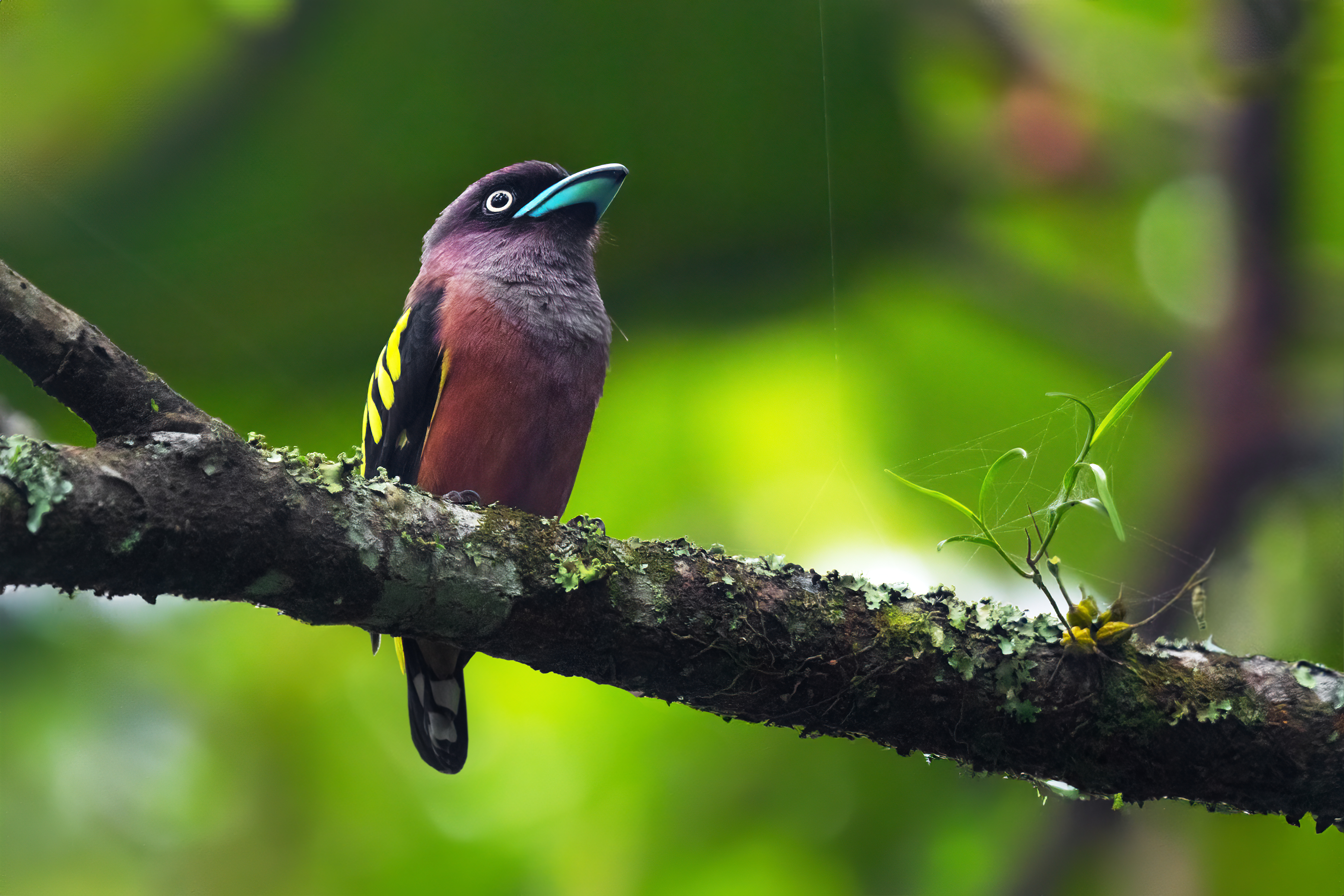
E. j. javanicus

- E. j. pallidus (Chasen, 1935): (Note: pallidus means pale and is derived from the Modern Latin pallidus, meaning pallid.) found from southeastern Myanmar to Vietnam and the Malay Peninsula. Populations from the northern Malay Peninsula are sometimes separated as E. j. friedmanni. It is similar to harterti, but has more metallic grey underparts and pinker throats and upperparts.
- E. j. harterti (van Oort, 1909): (Note: harterti is an eponym in honour of Ernst Johann Otto Hartert, a German ornithologist and natural history collector.) found on Sumatra, the Riau Archipelago, Bangka Island and Belitung. The population from Belitung was previously recognised as E. j. billitonis, but this is not generally accepted any more. It is larger than the nominate subspecies, with light blue-green irises, darker underparts, a more reddish upper back and a pink vent.
- E. j. javanicus (Horsfield, 1821): also known as the Javan broadbill, it is the nominate subspecies and found on Java. It is smaller than the other subspecies, with a yellow (instead of blue) iris, a narrower breast-band, a yellow (instead of purplish) vent and a paler belly.
- E. j. brookei (Robinson & Kloss, 1919): (Note: brookei is an eponym in honour of Charles Vyner Brooke, the third and last of the White Rajahs of Sarawak.) found on Borneo and the northern Natuna Islands. Like harterti, but is pinker, with an indistinct neckband, blacker forehead and pinker throat.

All the subspecies excluding javanicus are sometimes split as a separate species, E. harterti, on the basis of morphology, which would make the current species monotypic (having only one subspecies). According to this scheme, the nominate subspecies is called the Javan broadbill, and the three subspecies in E. harterti (harterti, brookei and pallidus) are called the banded broadbill.

== Description ==
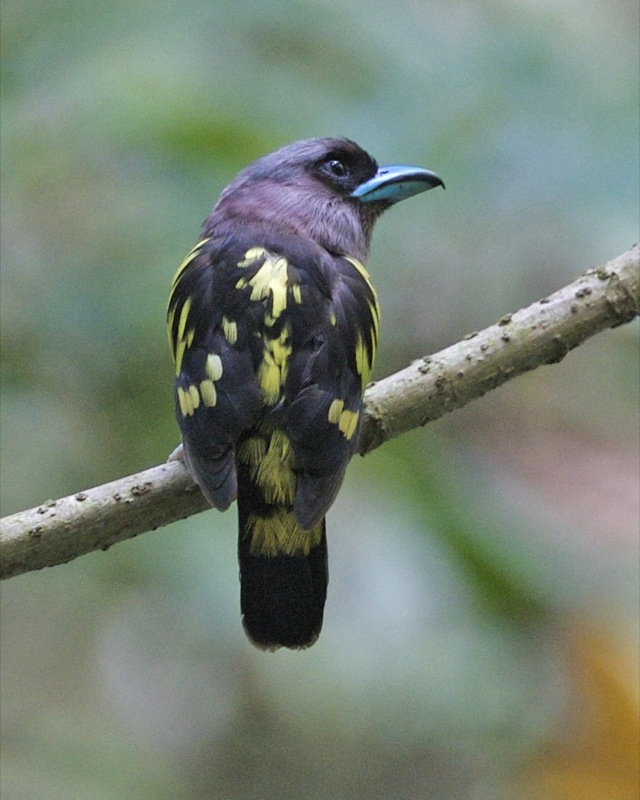
Adult from Sabah, Malaysian Borneo showing the markings on the wings and back

The banded broadbill is a striking, large-bodied bird, with a length of 21.5–23.0 cm (8.5–9.1 in). The weight of 10 adult pallidus specimens from the Malay Peninsula was 65.1–95.0 g (2.30–3.35 oz), males weighing slightly more than females. If seen clearly, the species is unlikely to be confused with any other bird. It may be mistaken for black-and-yellow broadbill, which differs in its smaller size, black head and contrasting white collar.

Adult males of the nominate subspecies have a glossy purple-red head, which turns black towards the lores (region between the eyes and beak) and base of the bill. The chin, throat and ear-coverts are slightly lighter, with a black band across the neck; this neckband is sometimes faint or absent in males from Borneo and Java. The top of the head is glossy maroon black and turns grey towards the back of the neck. The upper back is maroon-tinged dark brown; the rest of the back is mostly black, except for a central line of yellow streaks. The primary feathers are dark brown, with thin yellow edges that are present as a yellow line on the bend of the wing. The remaining wing-coverts are blackish, with yellowish markings. The secondaries have bright yellow edges to their outer margins that form a well-marked, trapezoidal patch on the wing. The underparts are pale pinkish-violet to wine-red, with a grey tinge to the chin and upper breast and a pure grey breast-band. The tail is dark black and has white spots on the underside, the undertail-coverts are pale yellow and the rump has a variable black and yellow pattern. The brilliant turquoise blue beak is broad and hooked, edged green or black. It is among the widest-billed broadbills, with a thick, heart-shaped and wide tongue that allows it to mash and "chew" its food, helping the species consume relatively large prey. The irises are pale yellow in javanicus and sapphire blue in all other subspecies, and the legs are pale pinkish-brown to light greyish-blue with dull black feathering.

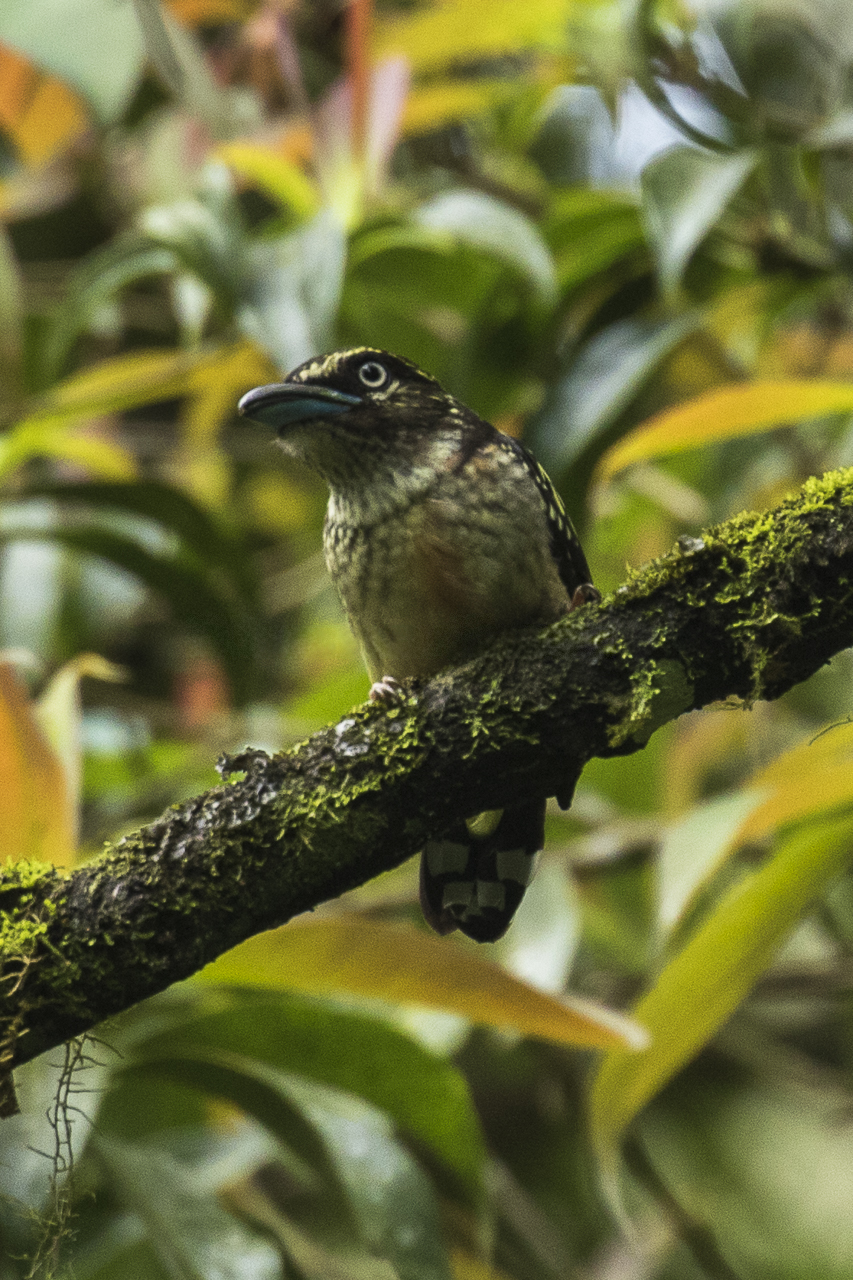
Juvenile in Mount Gede Pangrango National Park, West Java in August

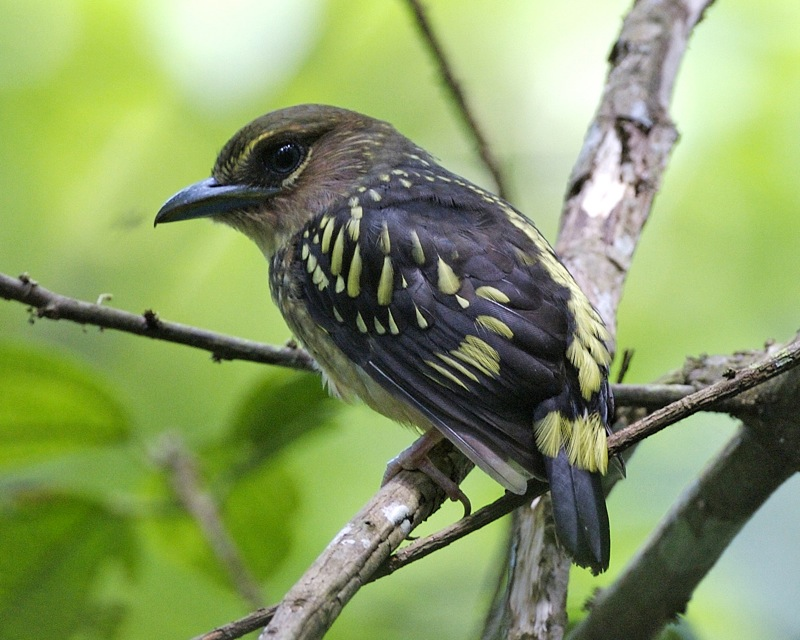
Juvenile in Sabah, Borneo in June

Females are similar to males, but can be told apart by their lack of a neckband and greyer heads and underparts. Juveniles have pale brown heads, brown upper backs, dark brown wings and black tails. They have a marked yellow supercilium (line above the eye) that widens towards the back of the neck to become a broken collar, and the ear-coverts have narrow yellow streaks. The upper back has irregular yellow spots and the back and rump are largely yellow. The wings have yellowish markings like those of adults. The throat is yellowish with pale dark streaks and is separated from the breast by a yellowish-white strip, the rest of the underparts being a pink-tinted yellow. The bill is orangish-brown. As juveniles age, the yellow on the body is gradually replaced with purple-pink, starting with the head and side of the neck. In Malaysia, moulting has been observed in all months except January and February and peaks from May to August. The primary feathers nearest the body are moulted first, and those further away moult later.

Reddish colours in the banded broadbill's plumage are caused by the biological pigment 2,3-didehydro-papilioerythrinone, which is also found in the black-and-yellow broadbill, black-and-red broadbill and Sarcophanops species. The yellow in the species' plumage is caused by the carotenoid 7,8-dihydro-3′-dehydro-lutein, which is also present in the plumage of the black-and-yellow broadbill.

=== Vocalisation ===
The species' song is a remarkable, short, loud wheeoo or wiuk, occasionally prefaced with 4–9 whirr notes and always followed with a noisy, high-speed, rattling trill lasting 5–9 seconds that initially rises in pitch before quickly falling. This song is frequently given by two birds one after the other, with neighbouring pairs then responding. It can be triggered by other sudden, loud sounds, but the response to playback (recorded birdsong) is usually sluggish. Other calls include a nasal whee-u, a squeaky kyeeow, a keowrr and a squealing keek-eek-eek similar to that of a black-and-red broadbill. Soft calls made during wing displays are less squeaky and lower than similar ones made by black-and-yellow broadbills.

== Distribution and habitat ==
The banded broadbill is found in Mainland Southeast Asia and the Greater Sunda Islands. In Indochina, it is known from southern and central Vietnam, most of western and southern Thailand, most of Cambodia excluding the Tonlé Sap, southern and central Laos and the Tenasserim Hills and Karen Hills in southeastern Myanmar. In the Greater Sundas, the species inhabits Sumatra, Borneo, Java, Belitung, Bangka Island, the North Natuna Islands and the Riau Archipelago. It went locally extinct in Singapore around 1928; reports of its presence on Penang Island are unconfirmed. It is usually non-migratory, but reports of an individual or multiple individuals living in a tract of secondary forest on a former rubber plantation in Kuala Lumpur over a period of three years indicates that the species wanders upon the loss of its usual habitat.

The species inhabits several types of forest, including primary forests, selectively logged forests that have regrown, peat swamp forests, high-altitude heath forests, freshwater swamp forests, forest edge, rubber plantations and Falcataria falcata groves. On the mainland, it is commonest in evergreen and mixed deciduous forests, but is also seen in adjacent gardens and villages, as well as secondary forests. On Java, it is usually seen in forest edge, especially on mountain slopes. Despite mainly being a lowland species, the banded broadbill is found up to elevations of 1,050–1,100 m (3,440–3,610 ft) on the Malay Peninsula and Sumatra, 1,100 m (3,600 ft) in Laos, 1,200 m (3,900 ft) in Cambodia and 1,220 m (4,000 ft) on Borneo. On Java, it is typically found at altitudes of 485–915 m (1,591–3,002 ft), but is sometimes as high as 1,500 m (4,900 ft).

== Behaviour and ecology ==
Despite the banded broadbill's distinctive and conspicuous colouration, it is generally hard to observe due to its lethargic habits and is generally only seen due to its loud song. It is known to make wing and gaping displays similar to those of the black-and-yellow broadbill. Wing displays include raising the wings slightly above the back and then slowly opening and closing the flight feathers, and are made after singing, foraging or in response to playback. They may include just one wing and are sometimes complemented with a tail wag. Gaping displays are conducted by opening and closing the bill measuredly without making any sounds. These displays are performed both when alone and in the presence of other banded broadbills, and have been observed being performed near nests. They are also sometimes accompanied by soft calls.

=== Feeding ===
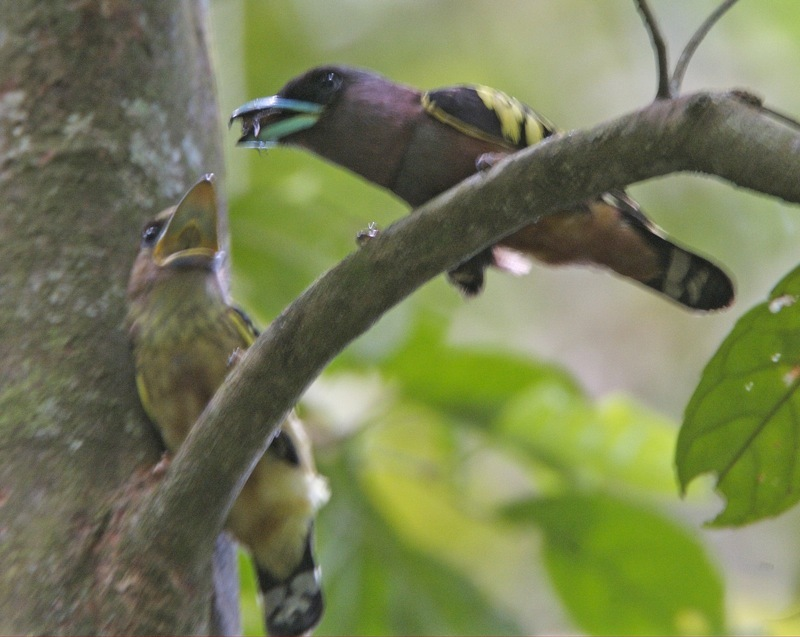
Adult banded broadbill feeding juvenile in Sabah

The banded broadbill's diet includes arthropods, small vertebrates and fruit. Its main prey is orthopterans (grasshoppers, katydids and crickets) with an average length of 55 mm (2.2 in). It also feeds on true bugs (Hemiptera), snails, spiders and beetles such as ground beetles (Carabidae), darkling beetles (Tenebrionidae) and true weevils (Curculionidae). Small fruit like Ficus figs are also eaten, although their importance in the species' diet is unknown. The broadbill has been recorded eating lizards up to 10 cm (3.9 in) long and frogs, eating both head-first.

Like other broadbills, the species forages in a sluggish manner. It has a toothed bill-tip and spends the majority of its time still-hunting, taking off from high perches and grabbing prey from nearby branches and the undersides of leaves. Except for probing head movements, often upwards, the broadbill is generally motionless. It has been observed making erratic, fluttering flights to glean prey before perching again, as well as catching prey in flight in a more elegant manner. Pairs and small flocks that are thought to be family groups are active throughout the day, occasionally joining mixed-species foraging flocks.

=== Breeding ===
On the Malay Peninsula, breeding in the banded broadbill usually takes place in the dry season following the East Asian Monsoon. The only recorded nest from Myanmar was observed in Tenasserim on 21 March. In Peninsular Malaysia, nests have been seen in February and March and immatures from early April to early September, extrapolating to eggs being laid from March to May and in July. Observances of nests and immatures in Thailand are at later times than in Malaysia, reflecting the passage of the monsoon. In Laos, immatures have been seen in June, indicating that breeding took place at the beginning of the wet season, instead of the dry season like the rest of the peninsula. The breeding season is lengthier on the Greater Sunda Islands, lasting from March to November. On Borneo, adults have been observed collecting nesting material in March and a recently fledged bird was seen in September; males with enlarged testicles have been collected from March to July. The banded broadbill's breeding season is particularly prolonged on Sumatra and Java. Immatures have been observed in March, July, September and November on Sumatra and eggs have been collected from Belitung in April. On Java, the species may breed throughout the year, with nests collected in April, June and December and immatures between March and December.

Like other typical broadbills, the banded broadbill's nests are usually made at a height of 6–21 m (20–69 ft) over clearings or water bodies, hanging from dead or living trees like dipterocarps and Koompassia excelsa. They have also been recorded being built on epiphytes like Pandanus, ferns and bamboo. Nests are generally hung from a sideways branch close to the trunk, but are sometimes also suspended from thick leaves and bamboo tips. Nests have been observed being built close to the beehives of species like the giant honey bee (Apis dorsata) and Halictidae sweat bees, a strategy that is also seen in the black-and-yellow broadbill and which may provide protection. One nest in Borneo was observed being built over a period of 18 days, both adults participating in nest-building. The nests are large, raggedy and oval or pear-shaped, with a total length of 75–90 cm (30–35 in), including the trailing tail. Materials used to make the nest include leaves, twigs, roots, fibres, moss, leaf skeletons, grass stems and bryophytes. Both sexes have been observed collecting nesting material. The inner chamber is covered with leaves and thick grass stems, and the outside is embellished with lichen, bryophytes, green moss, insect excreta, cocoons and cobwebs, presumably to provide camouflage. The entrances to the nest are covered by a slanting eave. A nest from Sabah had a height of 25 cm (9.8 in), a width of 22.5 cm (8.9 in) and a depth of 15 cm (5.9 in), with an entrance measuring 54 mm × 58 mm (2.1 in × 2.3 in).

The banded broadbill's eggs are oval-shaped and measure 26.1 mm–31.5 mm × 17.1 mm–22.2 mm (1.03 in–1.24 in × 0.67 in–0.87 in). They have a smooth and slightly shiny surface and are usually dull white with dark purple or reddish-brown flecks, denser at the wide end; West Javan eggs are dirty white, sometimes tinged pink, with dense rusty-brown to lavender-grey markings concentrated at the broader end. Clutches have generally two or three eggs, although they may sometimes have more. Incubation can start before the completion of the nest and one bout of incubation was recorded being 1.8 hours long. Little is known about the species' hatching and parental care, but parents continue to provide 70–80% of food to young 13 weeks after fledging, reducing to 20–30% by 20 weeks.

== Status ==
The International Union for Conservation of Nature, which splits the banded broadbill into two species, classifies javanicus as being near-threatened and all the other subspecies as being of least concern. Although it is patchily distributed and scarce in central and eastern Java, javanicus has also been observed in some protected areas like Mount Gede Pangrango National Park. Its population is unlikely to be above 10,000 adults and is thought to be decreasing. Threats to the subspecies include habitat loss and the cagebird trade. The remaining subspecies are mostly uncommon to locally common throughout their range, but have been described as being scarce in Brunei and very rare in northern Thailand. The populations inhabiting the Malay Peninsula are treated as being near-threatened. They are found in multiple protected areas.
