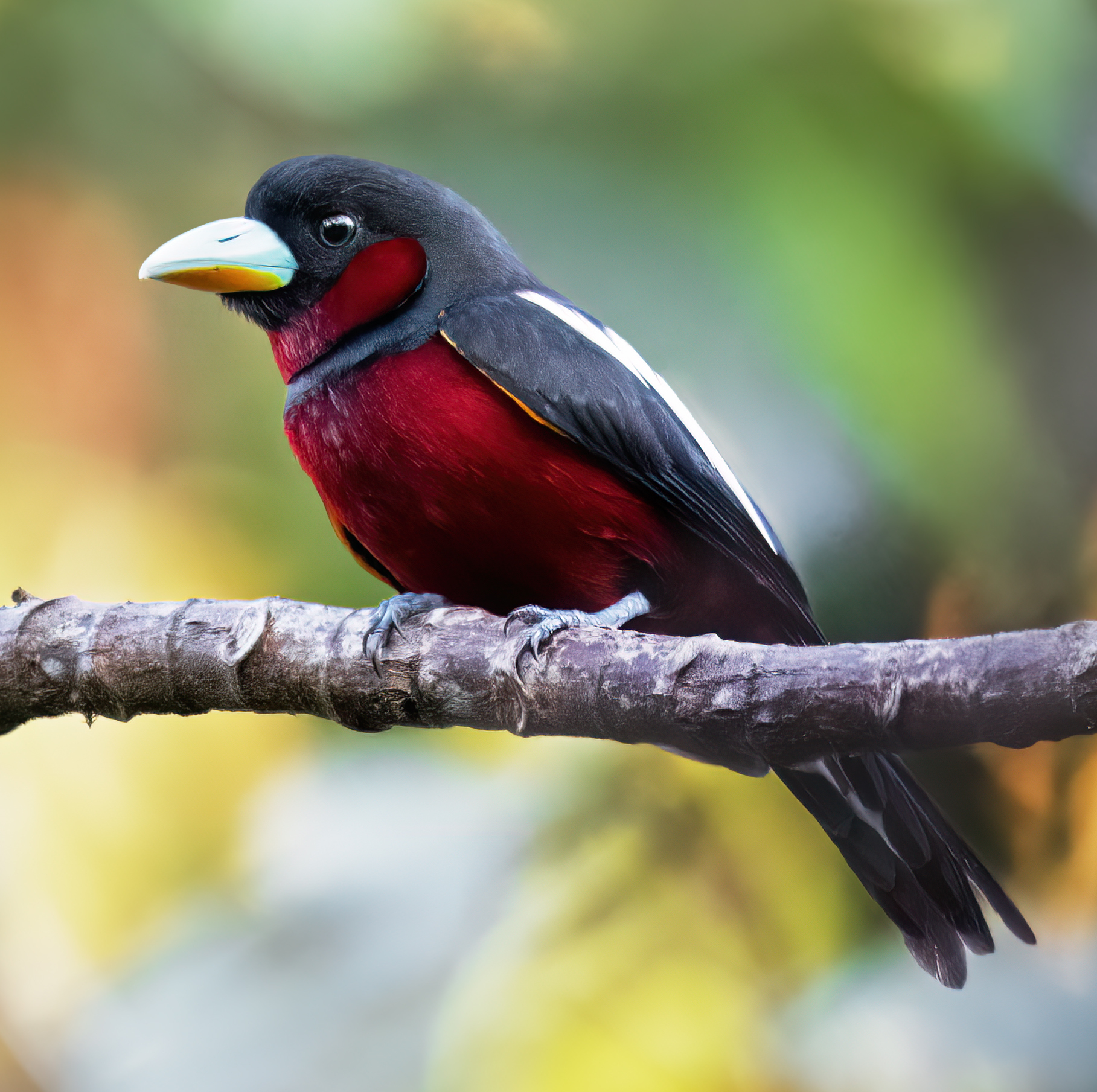

Conservation status
- Least Concern (IUCN 3.1)

Scientific classification
- Kingdom: Animalia
- Phylum: Chordata
- Class: Aves
- Order: Passeriformes
- Family: Eurylaimidae
- Genus: Cymbirhynchus; Vigors, 1830
- Species: C. macrorhynchos

Binomial name
- Cymbirhynchus macrorhynchos (Gmelin, 1788)
- Black-and-red broadbill distribution

Synonyms
- Todus macrorhynchos (Gmelin, 1788); Todus nasutus (Latham, 1790); Cymbirhynchus nasutus (Latham, 1790)

= Black-and-red broadbill =

Species of bird endemic to Southeast Asia

The black-and-red broadbill (Cymbirhynchus macrorhynchos) is a species of bird in the typical broadbill family, Eurylaimidae. It is the only species in the genus Cymbirhynchus. A large, distinctive bird, it has maroon underparts, black upperparts, a maroon neck-band, and white bars on the wings. It also has a large, two-colored, blue-and-yellow bill. The species shows slight sexual dimorphism, with females being smaller than males. No other bird in its range resembles it, though the black-and-yellow broadbill has a similar call.

The species is found in Brunei, Cambodia, Indonesia, Laos, Malaysia, Myanmar, Singapore, Thailand, and Vietnam. Inhabiting lowland riparian forest throughout its range, it can also adapt quite well to disturbed habitat, such as secondary forest growth and degraded habitat near rivers. The black-and-red broadbill is mainly insectivorous, supplementing its diet with aquatic creatures such as mollusks, snails, fish, and crustaceans. It also takes leaves and seeds incidentally.

Breeding takes place during the dry season throughout its range, with the nest being a large, conspicuous structure that usually hangs over water. Nests are built by both sexes, out of creepers, fungal hyphae, moss, and other plant matter. Eggs are laid in clutches of two or three, occasionally with a fourth runt egg, and incubated by both parents. The black-and-red broadbill is evaluated as a least-concern species by the International Union for Conservation of Nature due to its large range and the lack of a severe decrease in its global population. However, the species has experienced declines in several parts of its range, and may face threats due to deforestation, trapping for the songbird trade, and hunting.

== Taxonomy and systematics ==
The German naturalist Johann Friedrich Gmelin described the species as Todus macrorhynchos in 1788, based on a Bornean specimen that was originally described as a "great-billed tody" by the English naturalist John Latham in 1782. Later, in 1790, the species was named Todus nasutus by Latham, as he had not provided scientific names in his first description. However, priority is afforded to Gmelin's name. The genus Cymbirhynchus was erected for this species in 1830 by Nicolas Vigors and Thomas Horsfield.

The generic name is from the Greek κυμβη (kumbē), which could mean either "small boat" or "an unknown bird", and ῥυγχος (rhunkhos), meaning bill. The specific name macrorhynchos comes from the Greek μακρορρυγχος (makrorrunkhos), meaning long-billed. "Black-and-red broadbill" is the official English common name designated by the International Ornithologists' Union; other common names in English include black-red broadbill and black and white broadbill. The species is also known by the names Nok Phaya Paak Kwaang thong daeng in Thai, Chim Mỏ rộng đỏ and Mỏ rộng đỏ in Vietnamese, Sempur-hujan sungai in Indonesian, and Takau rakit and burong tĕrajan in Malay (with the latter name only being used in the state of Kelantan).

The black-and-red broadbill is the only species in the genus Cymbirhynchus, in the typical broadbill family Eurylaimidae, a family of ten tropical species native to Southeast Asia. Based on a 2017 study of mitochondrial and nuclear DNA by the Brazilian researcher Alexandre Selvatti and colleagues, its closest relative is the silver-breasted broadbill. These two species are most closely related to the Eurylaimus broadbills, and all three genera form a sister clade to the genus Sarcophanops. This clade is sister to one formed by the long-tailed broadbill and dusky broadbill. Both of these clades are sister to the Grauer's broadbill. The following cladogram shows phylogenetic relationships among the Eurylaimidae, based on the 2017 study: (Note: The study did not include the Visayan broadbill, which was formerly considered conspecific with the wattled broadbill. Additionally, it treated the grey-lored broadbill as being conspecific with the silver-breasted broadbill.)

- Eurylaimidae
  - Grauer's broadbill (Pseudocalyptomena graueri)
  - - - Long-tailed broadbill (Psarisomus dalhousiae)
      - Dusky broadbill (Corydon sumatranus)
    - - Wattled broadbill (Sarcophanops steerii)
      - - - Silver-breasted broadbill (Serilophus lunatus)
          - Black-and-red broadbill (Cymbirhynchus macrorhynchos)
        - - Banded broadbill (Eurylaimus javanicus)
          - Black-and-yellow broadbill (Eurylaimus ochromalus)

=== Subspecies ===
There are four subspecies recognised by the IOU and The Clements Checklist of Birds of the World; BirdLife International recognises only two subspecies, C. m. macrorhynchos and C. m. malaccensis, and treats C. m. affinis as a separate species. The geographical limits of subspecies are not clearly defined, but the species displays clinal variation in appearance, as the size of birds increases and the white on the tail decreases from north to south through its range.

- C. m. macrorhynchos (J. F. Gmelin, 1788): The nominate, it is found on Borneo, Sumatra, and some offshore islands. Sumatran populations are sometimes separated as C. m. lemniscatus. Populations from south Sumatra are also occasionally treated as a distinct subspecies tenebrosus.
- C. m. malaccensis Salvadori, 1874: Found in the Malay Peninsula. It was also formerly found in Singapore. It is slightly smaller than the nominate and has slightly paler red plumage.
- C. m. siamensis Meyer de Schauensee and Ripley, 1940: Found from southern Myanmar to northern peninsular Malaysia and southern Thailand, also extending into Cambodia, southern Laos, and southern Vietnam. It is very similar in appearance to malaccensis, but is smaller and has shorter wings, along with a higher proportion of white-tipped tail feathers.

== Description ==
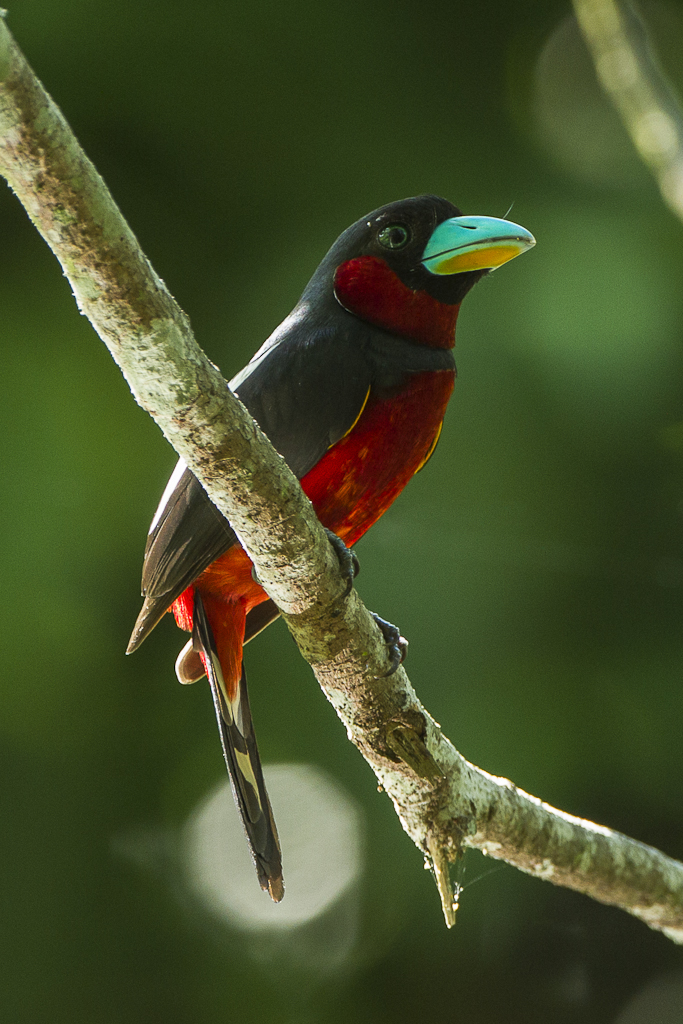
In Kaeng Krachan, Thailand

A large broadbill, the black-and-red broadbill has distinctive plumage and is unlikely to be mistaken for any other species within its range. The average adult is around 21–24 cm (8.3–9.4 in) in length, with wing lengths of 9.7–10.8 cm (3.8–4.3 in) and weighs 51–65 g (1.8–2.3 oz). Both sexes are similar in appearance, but the species shows slight sexual dimorphism, with the females being smaller in size. Adults have black heads and breastbands, greenish-black upperparts, with a maroon half-collar and bright maroon rumps and uppertail coverts (flight feathers on the tail and wing). The scapulars (feathers on the outside of the shoulder bone) have pure white edges, forming a white line on the closed wing. The bend of the wing has a narrow orange line. The tail is black, with variable amounts of white. The bill is dichromatic, with a bright turquoise-blue maxilla, and a yellow-orange mandible with a blue tip and edges. The irises are bright emerald green. The feet are bright blue, and sometimes tinged violet.

Immature birds are similar to adults, but have browner upperwings, and have white spots at the tips of the median coverts (second row of coverts on the wing), along with purple irises. Juveniles have much duller plumages, with sooty brown upper parts, maroon patches on the rump and uppertail coverts, brown underparts and wings, and white patches on the outer webs of the scapulars. They also have blackish to brownish-blue bills and bronze irises. The base of the beak has several short bristles and two long bristles almost as long as the beak. Their feet are dull blue-grey.

The brilliant red plumage of the species is caused by the biological pigment 2,3-didehydro-papilioerythrinone, which is also present in birds with red plumage in the genera Sarcophanops and Eurylaimus.

One of the most striking features of the black-and-red broadbill is its large, boat-like bill. It is thought that the wide bill and gape first evolved in the common ancestor of all broadbills, as an adaptation to an insectivorous diet. Its tongue is also large and fleshy to help manipulate objects inside its beak.

=== Vocalizations ===
The black-and-red broadbill is much less vocal than other species of typical broadbills, often remaining silent, and with quieter calls than most other broadbills. They also make ascending 'weeet' sounds, similar to those of the black-and-yellow broadbill, but shorter, slower, softer, and quieter. Its advertising call may be a rising cicada-like trill. The alarm call is a series of rapid 'pip' notes. A repeated soft 'wiark' has been reported as a contact call between a pair building a nest. Other calls include a monotonous and repetitive 'tyook', a hoarse 'ka-ka-kraar-kraar', a sharp 'peek-peek-peek', churring calls, melodious whistles, a hoarse twanging 'cow', and puma-like snarls. The most frequently heard call in Laos was a series of accelerating 'parnk' notes, similar to the noise made by the wingbeats of a wreathed hornbill.

== Distribution and habitat ==
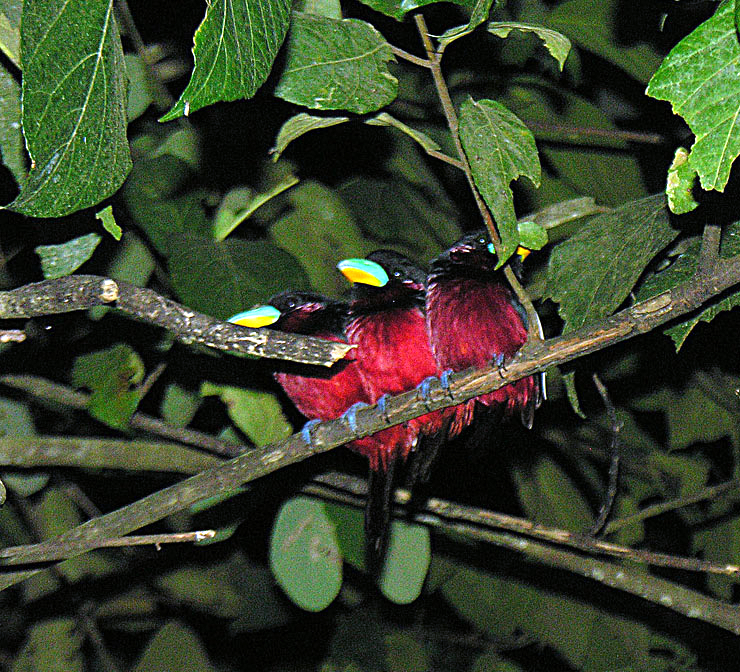
Black-and-red broadbills roosting in a group in eastern Sabah

The black-and-red broadbill is found in Brunei, Cambodia, Indonesia, Laos, Malaysia, Myanmar, Singapore, Thailand, and Vietnam. In peninsular Thailand, it has vanished locally from some areas. It was also common in Singapore until the 1940s, after which it was not recorded until 2004, and then 2020. It mainly inhabits riparian forest edges up to altitudes of 300 m (980 ft) throughout its range, although it can sometimes be found up to altitudes of 900 m (3,000 ft) m. In areas further downstream, it inhabits screw-palm swamps near the edges of mangroves. In areas affected by heavy land-conversion, it inhabits rubber plantations and coconut groves or orchards that have water channels. It has also been observed in peat swamp forest, but rarely enters closed-canopy forest. The species adapts well to disturbed habitat, surviving in secondary forest that has some tall trees remaining, as well as secondary vegetation with clumps of forest in pastureland. It also inhabits seriously degraded habitats along rivers.

== Behavior and ecology ==
The black-and-red broadbill is mainly found singly, in pairs, or in family parties. The species has been known to roost in small groups. There are occasional records of multiple adults vocalizing together, which are thought to be territorial encounters. The species has a generation length of three years.

=== Breeding ===
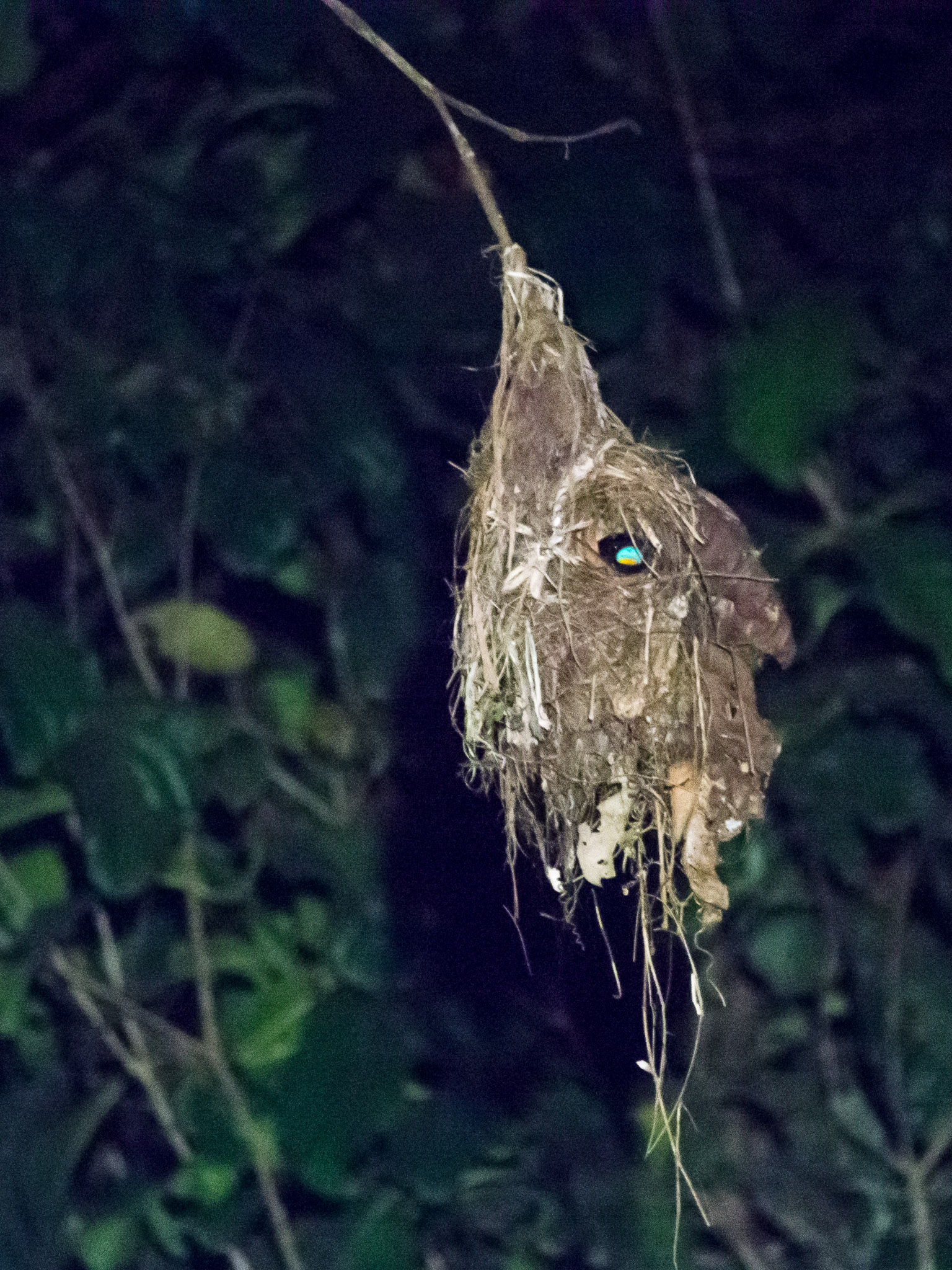
A nesting black-and-red broadbill in Tabin Wildlife Reserve, Borneo

Throughout its range, nesting usually occurs in the driest months of the year: from January to August in Malaysia, from late February to June in Myanmar, in May and June in Thailand, December to August in Borneo, and March to June in Sumatra. Occupied nests have also been reported in June in Vietnam and in May in Laos, both near the end of the local dry seasons. Nests are conspicuous and usually overhang water, especially fast-moving water. They are mostly built over forest pools, rivers, and streams, and less commonly over coastal slacks, tidal mangroves, and man-made drainage ditches. Nests are occasionally built far from water, or over roads and paths. It is possible that this may be related to the feeding requirements of the species, as the necessary food to feed mates or young may only be available near water.

Nests are built by both sexes, usually taking around 11 days to build, but sometimes taking up to 49 days. In some cases, 1–2 assistants also help construct the nest. The nests are smaller than those of other broadbills, being 25–46 cm (9.8–18.1 in) tall (excluding the hanging tail), 14.7–31.0 cm (5.8–12.2 in) wide, and weighing 59.7–181.9 g (2.11–6.42 oz). The entrance is 3.8–6.5 cm (1.5–2.6 in) in diameter, while the inner chamber is 9.5–13.0 cm (3.7–5.1 in) tall and 6–9 cm (2.4–3.5 in) in diameter. They are ragged, bag-shaped or pear-shaped structures, made out of tightly woven grasses, vines, sticks, bark, leaves, creepers, rootlets, vegetable fibers, pieces of moss, and fungal hyphae. The inside of the base is usually lined with soft material such as green leaves. The side entrance has a roof made of grass or fibers. Nests are usually fixed to thin, flexible, and spiked branches or shoots, from Senegalia pennata and Bambusa species.

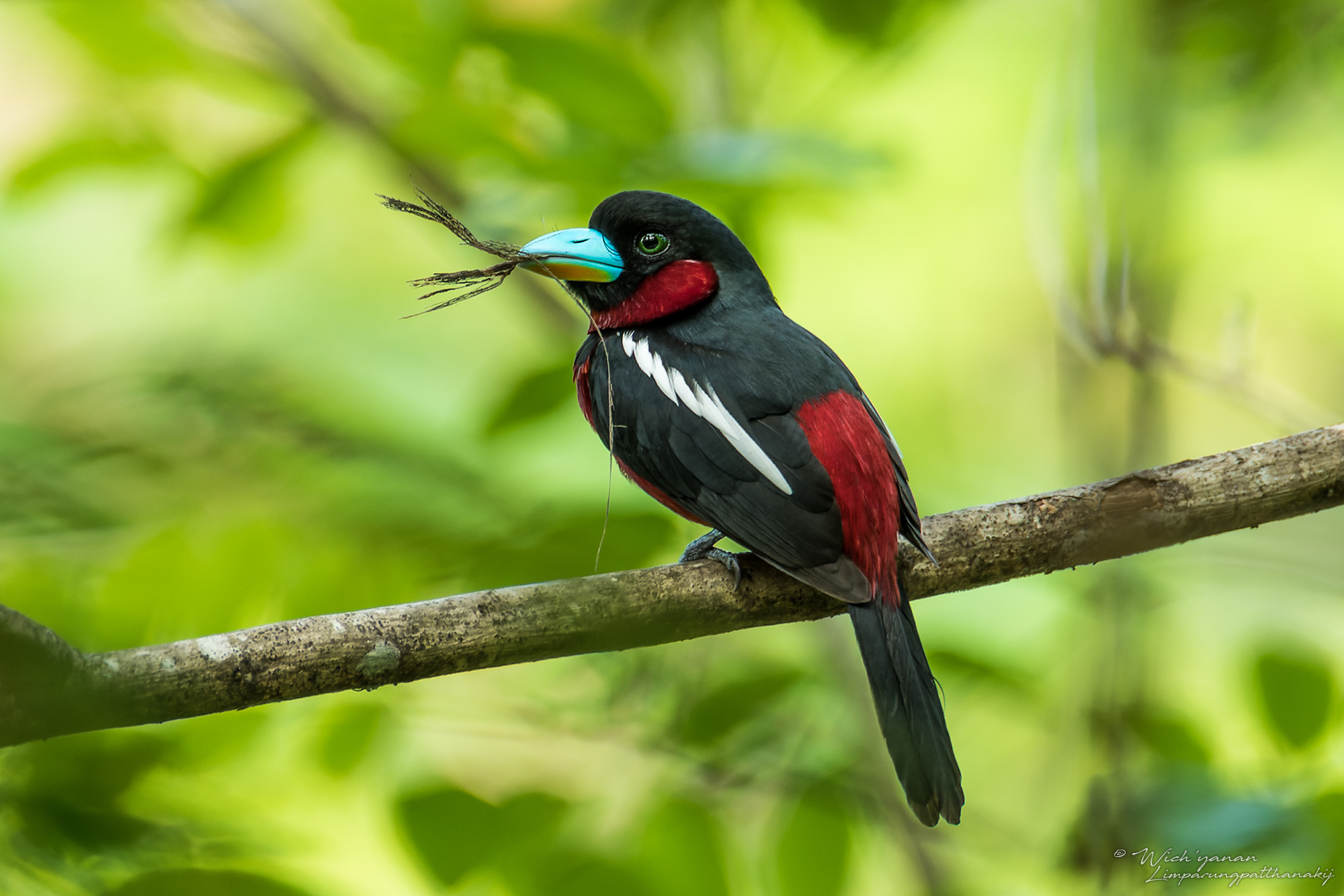
C. m. siamensis carrying nesting material in Kaeng Krachan National Park

The black-and-red broadbill lays eggs in clutches of 2–3 (occasionally with a fourth runt egg), with the eggs being 25.0 mm–29.3 mm × 18.2 mm–20.7 mm (0.98 in–1.15 in × 0.72 in–0.81 in) in size. The eggs are whitish to pinkish in color and are present in three morphs, with most having dense reddish-brown splotches all over the surface, concentrated at the large end, while some have only sparse brick-red splotching. Some eggs have been reported with sparse black spots. Eggs are laid at intervals of 24 hours, and both sexes incubate the eggs. Incubation takes 21 days, after which altricial young hatch. The young are cared for by both parents for around 17 days. Threats to young include forest fires, predators, and human disturbance.

=== Diet ===
Chiefly insectivorous, the black-and-red broadbill feeds on a variety of insects such as ants, beetles, crickets, grasshoppers, caterpillars, and hemipteran bugs. It also feeds on a variety of riverine creatures, such as mollusks, snails, crustaceans, and small fish. It has been documented to eat seeds and leaves, although these may also have been taken incidentally. Foraging is done by seizing prey from the ground and the water's edge. It has also been observed catching flying moths from above streams.

=== Parasites and predators ===
In Vietnam, a 2014 study of 157 black-and-red broadbills found that all the examined individuals were parasitized by the chewing louse Myrsidea claytoni. The number of parasites ranged from 5–80, with 27 on average. This was a case of host-switching, as all the other natural hosts of M. claytoni in Vietnam are bulbuls. They have also been observed being parasitized by a species of louse in the genus Brueelia in Cat Tien. Its nests are parasitized by the oribatid mites Dimidiogalumna grandjeani and Yoshiobodes hexasetosus, and the prostigmatic mite Neocunaxoides tropicus in Vietnam. In Thailand, the subspecies malaccensis and siamensis are parasitized by the chewing louse Guimaraesiella cyanophoba. Potential predators of the black-and-red broadbill include raptors, civets, monkeys, snakes, and monitor lizards.

== Status ==
Although the black-and-red broadbill's population has not been determined and is thought to be decreasing, it is not considered to be threatened due to its large range and is consequently listed as least-concern on the International Union for Conservation of Nature (IUCN) Red List of Threatened Species. The Irrawaddy broadbill, considered a separate species by the IUCN, is also listed as being of least-concern despite a decreasing population. The species occurs in many protected areas throughout its range, where its populations are relatively secure. However, it has experienced considerable declines in some parts of its range, such as Thailand, due to deforestation, although it is still locally common where suitable habitat exists. The broadbill is common in the lowlands on Borneo, but is rare at higher elevations and in forest. On Sumatra, it was previously reported as being the most prevalent broadbill, but is now very rare despite a large distribution. It is generally hard to find in Indochina, but is locally abundant in suitable habitat. It is also common where suitable habitat exists in Myanmar, although there is a lack of recent records corroborating this. Other threats to the species include trapping for the songbird trade and hunting.
