= Ayeyarwady broadbill =

Scientific classification
- Kingdom: Animalia
- Phylum: Chordata
- Class: Aves
- Order: Passeriformes
- Family: Eurylaimidae
- Genus: Cymbirhynchus
- Species: C. affinis

Binomial name
- Cymbirhynchus affinis Blyth, 1846

Synonyms
- Cymbirhynchus macrorhynchos affinis

Species of bird

The Ayeyarwady broadbill (Cymbirhynchus affinis) is a species of bird in the family Eurylaimidae. It is endemic to southern Myanmar. Until recently, it was considered conspecific with the black-and-red broadbill. It was described by Edward Blyth in 1846. It is monotypic. It is considered the longest "lost" bird species in continental Asia and was last sighted in 1874.

== Taxonomy and systematics ==
This species was earlier considered conspecific with the black-and-red broadbill but was separated from it based on several morphological characters.

== Specimens and records ==
This species is only known from six localities in southern Myanmar in the Irrawaddy Delta and surrounding regions:

- Ramree Island
- Nyaunggyo
- Nyaungdon
- Yangon
- Pathein
- Maw Tin Soon

The last locality is doubtful as the author, Eugene W. Oates, indicated Maw Tin Soon as part of the range of this species, but later he qualified this with the word ‘probably’.

== Description ==
This species is dichromatic, with black head, upperparts and wings. The collar, underparts and rump are maroon in colour. Except for the central retrices, all of the tail feathers are black with broad white tail bars. The sexes are alike.

It differs from the black-and-red broadbill by its smaller size, long crimson spots on the innermost secondary, and broader white tail tips. The wingspan of this species is 8.9 centimeters (3.5 inches), and the tail length is 7 centimeters (2.7 inches).

== Habits ==
It habitat is not well known, although records indicate that it occurred in hill forests. Its closest congener, the black-and-red broadbill, is found in lowland riparian forests.
