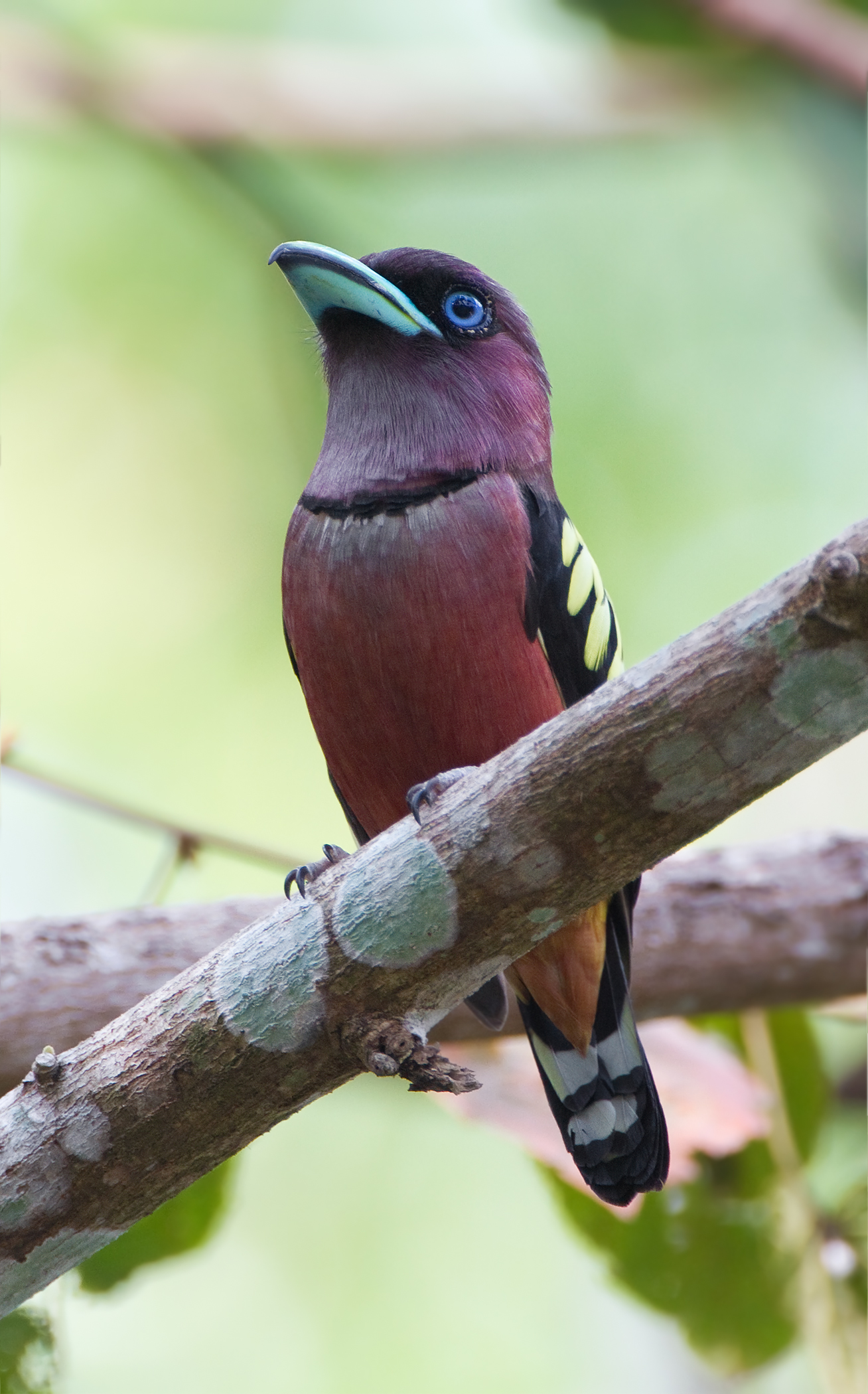
- Banded broadbill Eurylaimus javanicus

Scientific classification
- Kingdom: Animalia
- Phylum: Chordata
- Class: Aves
- Order: Passeriformes
- Infraorder: Eurylaimides
- Family: Eurylaimidae; Lesson, 1831

Genera
- Cymbirhynchus; Psarisomus; Serilophus; Eurylaimus; Sarcophanops; Corydon; Pseudocalyptomena

= Eurylaimidae =

Family of birds

The Eurylaimidae are a family of suboscine passerine birds that occur from the eastern Himalayas to Indonesia and the Philippines. The family previously included the sapayoa from the Neotropics, the asities from Madagascar, and the Calyptomenidae from Africa and Asia, but these are now separated into distinct families.

== Description ==
Many of the species are brightly coloured birds that present broad heads, large eyes and a hooked, flat and broad beak. They range from 13 to 28 centimetres in length, and live in the dense canopies of wet forests, allowing them to hide despite their brightly coloured plumage. The plumage of the juvenile eurylaimids are similar to those of the adults, differing in being duller and shorter-winged and shorter-tailed in some cases.

== Behaviour and ecology ==
They are for the most part insectivorous and carnivorous. Prey taken includes insects, spiders, centipedes, and millipedes, as well as lizards and tree frogs. Prey is obtained by sallying from a perch to snatch it in flight, and gleaning the prey off leaves and branches while flying. Some species may take some fruit, but only the green broadbills of the genus Calyptomena and the Grauer's broadbill are primarily frugivores (which also take some insects).

They are generally gregarious, with many species moving about in flocks of about 20 individuals. They attach their purse-shaped nests to suspended vines, and leave a tail of fibres hanging below it. This gives the nest the appearance of being random debris caught in the tree, an effect further enhanced by the birds covering the nest with lichen and spider webs. Broadbills typically lay two to three eggs.

== Taxonomy and systematics ==
The family Eurylaimidae was introduced in 1831 (as Eurylaimes) by the French naturalist René Lesson. They were characterized by a simple syrinx with just a single pair of muscles, the front toes being partially fused at the base and having 15 neck vertebrae. A DNA sequence-based study by Carl Oliveros and colleagues published in 2019 determined the phylogenetic relationships of the Eurylaimidae to other families in the Eurylaimides (Old World suboscines):

- Eurylaimides
  - - Philepittidae (asites)
    - Eurylaimidae (eurylaimid broadbills)
  - - Calyptomenidae (African and green broadbills)
    - - Sapayoidae (sapayoa)
      - Pittidae (pittas)

A study published in 2017 determined the following phylogenetic relationships among the Eurylaimidae: (Note: The study did not include the Visayan broadbill, which was formerly considered conspecific with the wattled broadbill.)

- Eurylaimidae
  - Grauer's broadbill (Pseudocalyptomena graueri)
  - - - Long-tailed broadbill (Psarisomus dalhousiae)
      - Dusky broadbill (Corydon sumatranus)
    - - Wattled broadbill (Sarcophanops steerii)
      - - - Silver-breasted broadbill (Serilophus lunatus)
          - Black-and-red broadbill (Cymbirhynchus macrorhynchos)
        - - Banded broadbill (Eurylaimus javanicus)
          - Black-and-yellow broadbill (Eurylaimus ochromalus)

The family includes eleven species of which three are each placed in their own monotypic genus:

Image	Genus	Living species
	Cymbirhynchus Vigors, 1830	Black-and-red broadbill, Cymbirhynchus macrorhynchos; Ayeyarwady broadbill, Cymbirhynchus affinis
	Psarisomus Swainson, 1837	Long-tailed broadbill, Psarisomus dalhousiae
	Serilophus Swainson, 1837	Silver-breasted broadbill, Serilophus lunatus; Grey-lored broadbill, Serilophus rubropygius
	Eurylaimus Horsfield, 1821	Banded broadbill, Eurylaimus javanicus; Black-and-yellow broadbill, Eurylaimus ochromalus
	Sarcophanops Gould, 1877	Wattled broadbill, Sarcophanops steerii; Visayan broadbill, Sarcophanops samarensis
	Corydon Lesson, 1828	Dusky broadbill, Corydon sumatranus
	Pseudocalyptomena Rothschild, 1909	Grauer's broadbill, Pseudocalyptomena graueri
