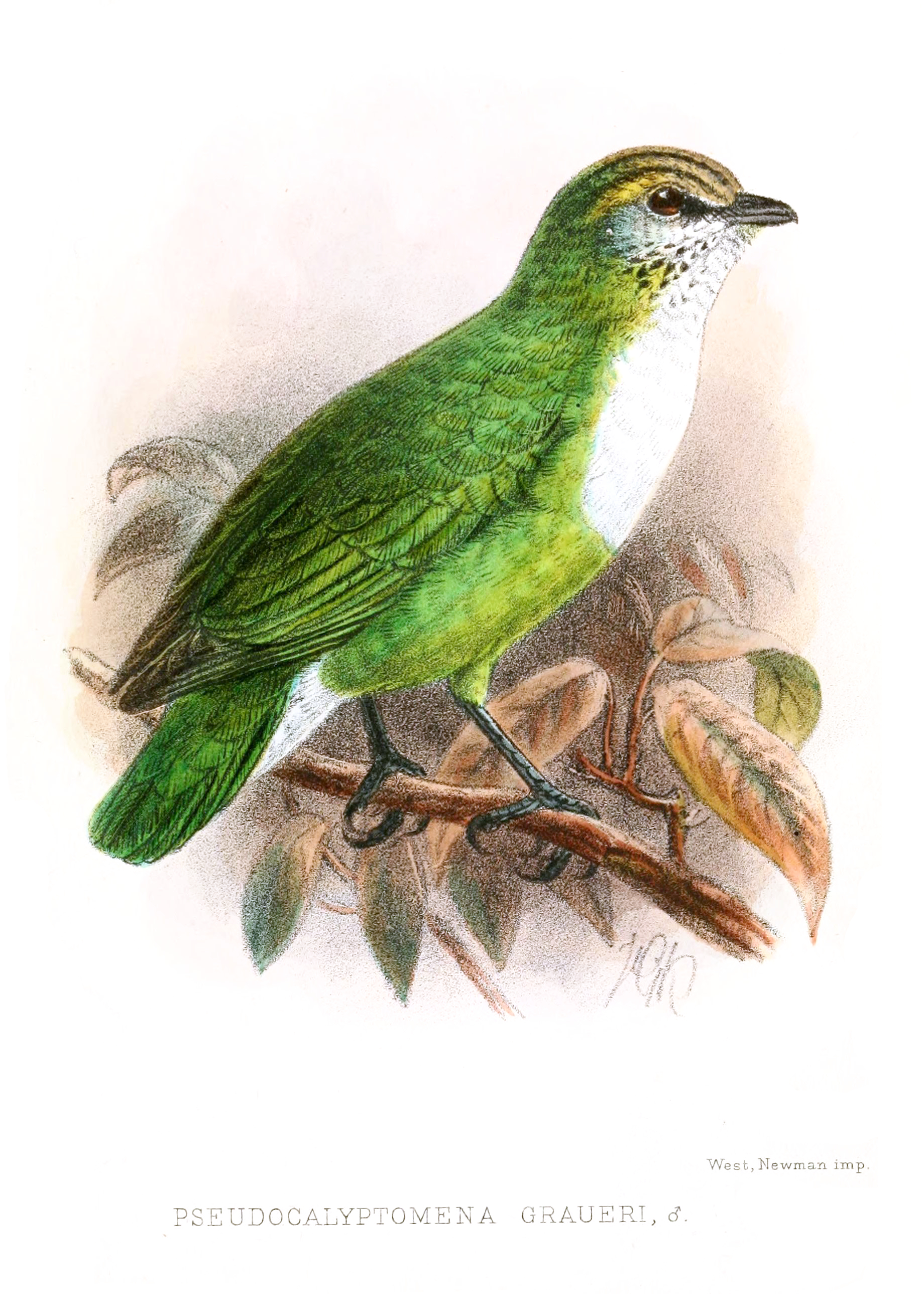

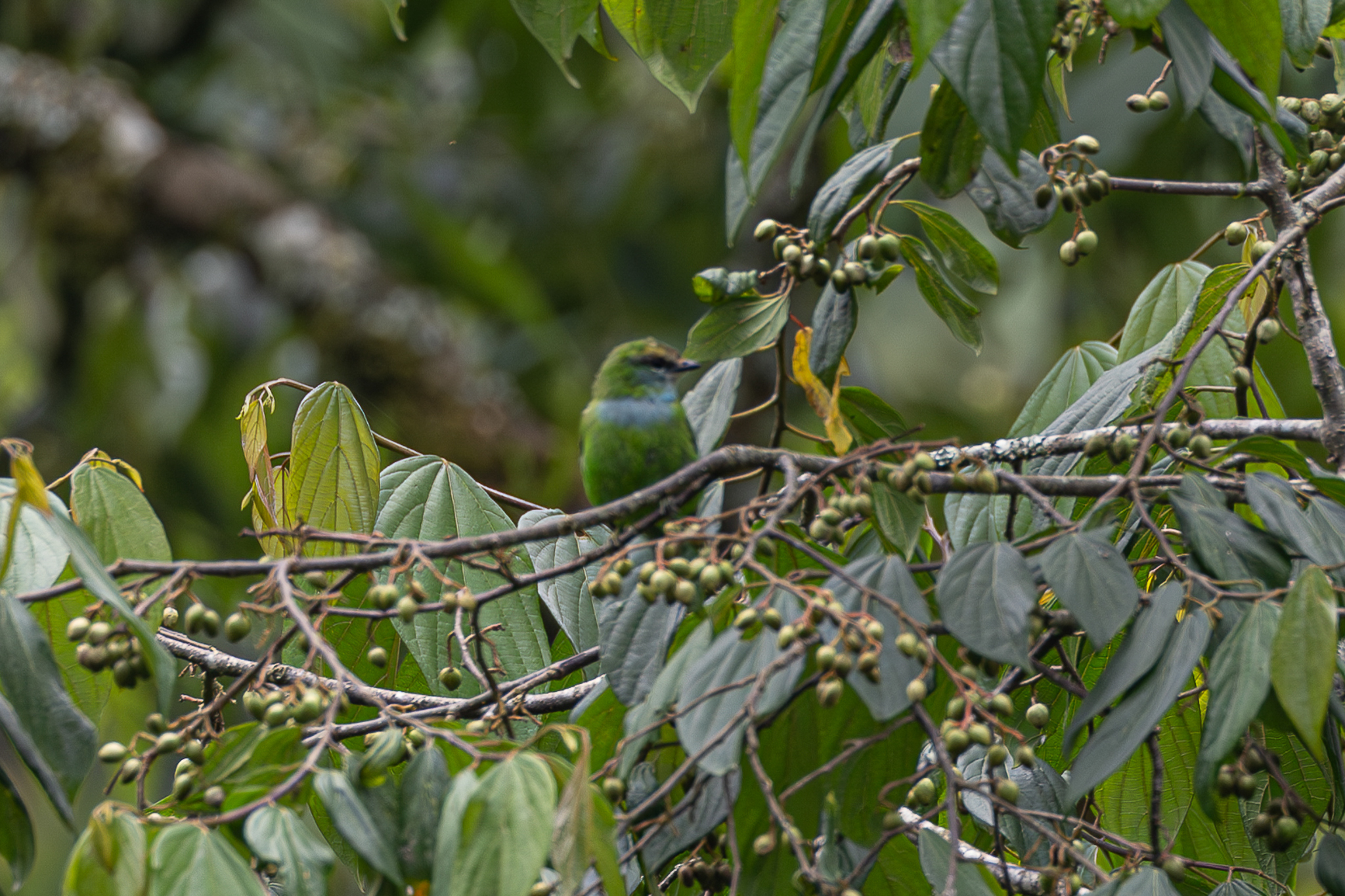

Conservation status
- Vulnerable (IUCN 3.1)

Scientific classification
- Kingdom: Animalia
- Phylum: Chordata
- Class: Aves
- Order: Passeriformes
- Family: Eurylaimidae
- Genus: Pseudocalyptomena; Rothschild, 1909
- Species: P. graueri

Binomial name
- Pseudocalyptomena graueri Rothschild, 1909
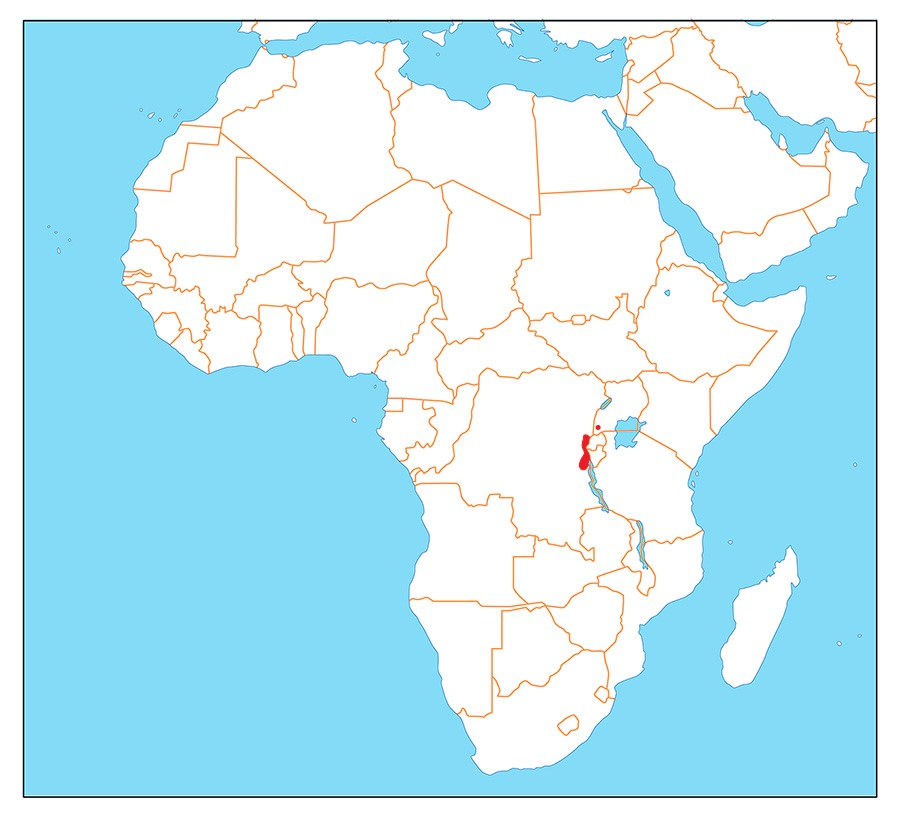

= Grauer's broadbill =

Species of bird

Grauer's broadbill (Pseudocalyptomena graueri), also known as the African green broadbill, is a species of bird in the family Eurylaimidae, and is monotypic within the genus Pseudocalyptomena. Its name commemorates the German zoologist Rudolf Grauer who collected natural history specimens in the Belgian Congo.

== Etymology and taxonomy ==
Baron Walter Rothschild, who described this species, considered it to be a flycatcher only superficially similar to the Asian broadbills of the genus Calyptomena, hence the name pseudo- or "false" Calyptomena. It is currently regarded as an actual broadbill, one of only a few African representatives of a primarily Asian family.

== Description ==
It is bright green with a blue throat and vent and a small bill, quite unlike those of other broadbill species. Adults have finely black-streaked buff crowns and narrow black eyestripes.

== Habitat and range ==
It occurs in tropical moist montane forest, and is endemic to the Albertine Rift Mountains of the Democratic Republic of Congo and Uganda. In Uganda it is a rare resident at 2,100 to 2,200 metres in the Bwindi Impenetrable Forest. Density is probably less than one individual per km^{2}.

== Diet ==
Grauer's broadbill feeds on seeds and fruit, flowers and flower buds, and some invertebrates.

== Status ==
This species is rare, but currently protected only in part of its range. It is threatened by deforestation and habitat degradation, particularly as its currently known distribution overlaps with areas that have seen massive human population influxes in the recent past. It has been classified as vulnerable by the IUCN.
