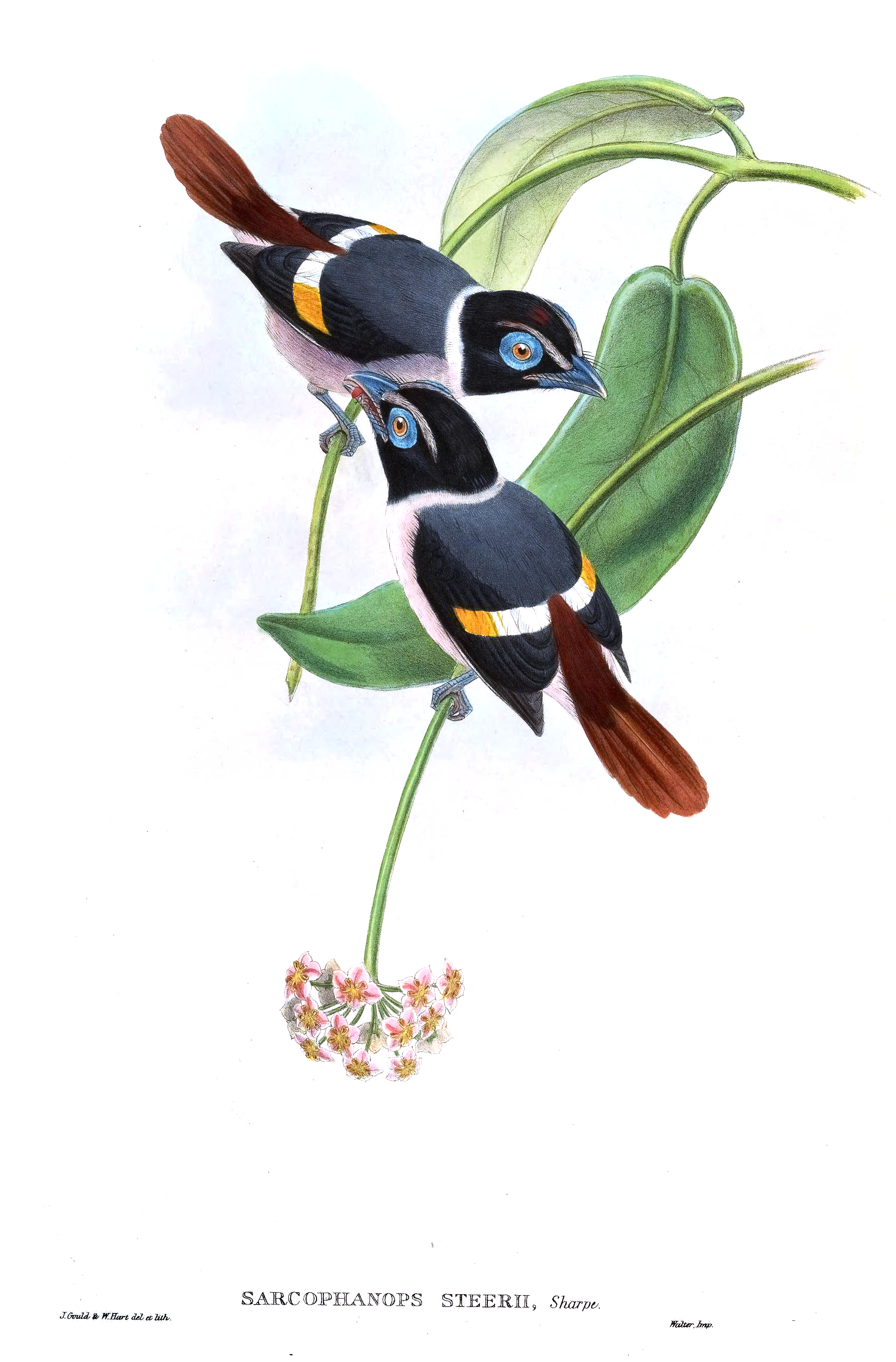
- Wattled broadbill (Sarcophanops steerii)

Scientific classification
- Kingdom: Animalia
- Phylum: Chordata
- Class: Aves
- Order: Passeriformes
- Family: Eurylaimidae
- Genus: Sarcophanops; Gould, 1877

= Sarcophanops =

Genus of birds

Sarcophanops is a genus of broadbills (family Eurylaimidae) found in the Philippines.

== Species ==
Two species are recognized:

Image	Scientific name	Common name	Distribution
	Sarcophanops steerii	Wattled broadbill	Mindanao, Basilan, Dinagat and Siargao in the Philippines.
	Sarcophanops samarensis	Visayan broadbill	Samar, Leyte and Bohol in the central Philippines
