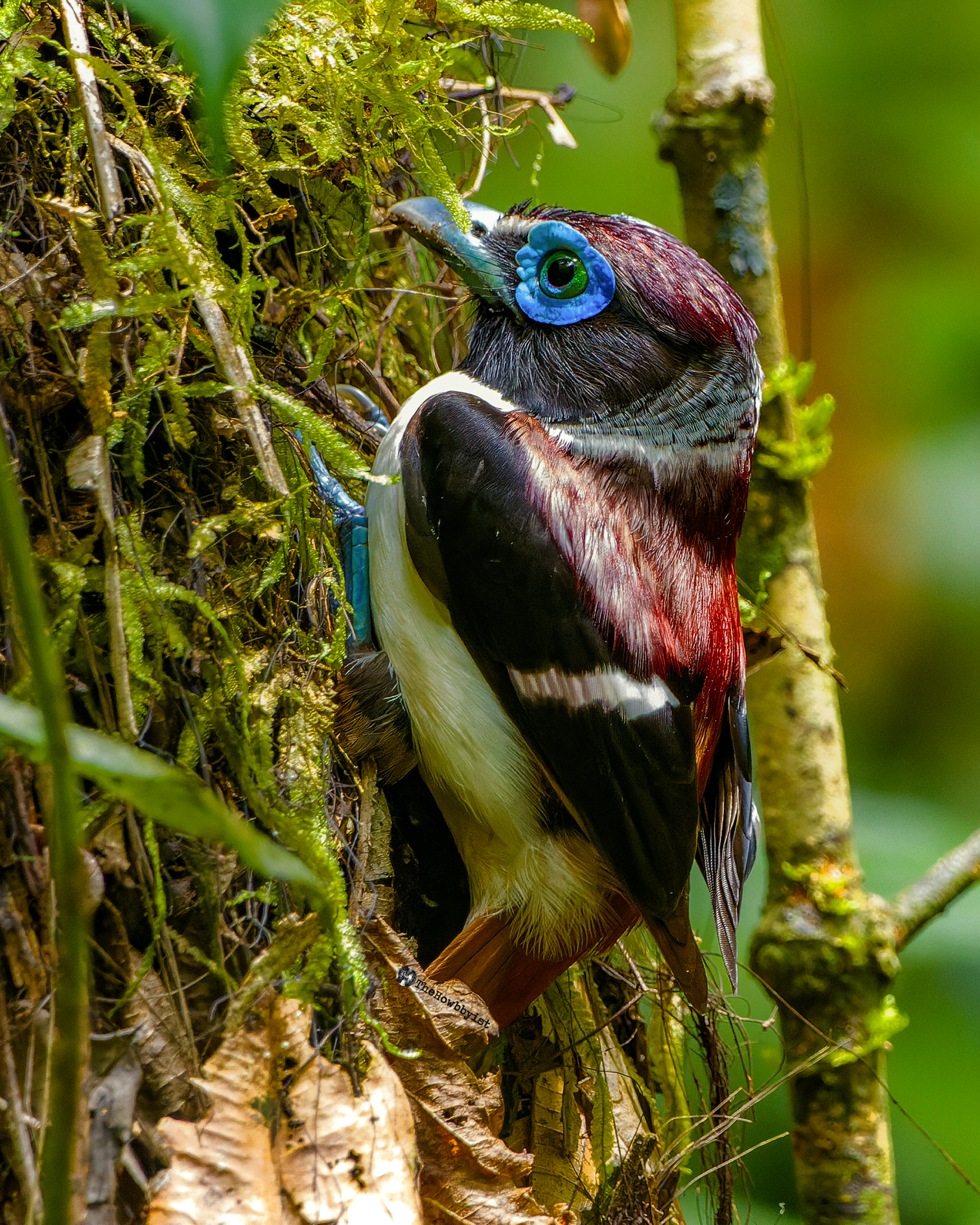
- Female
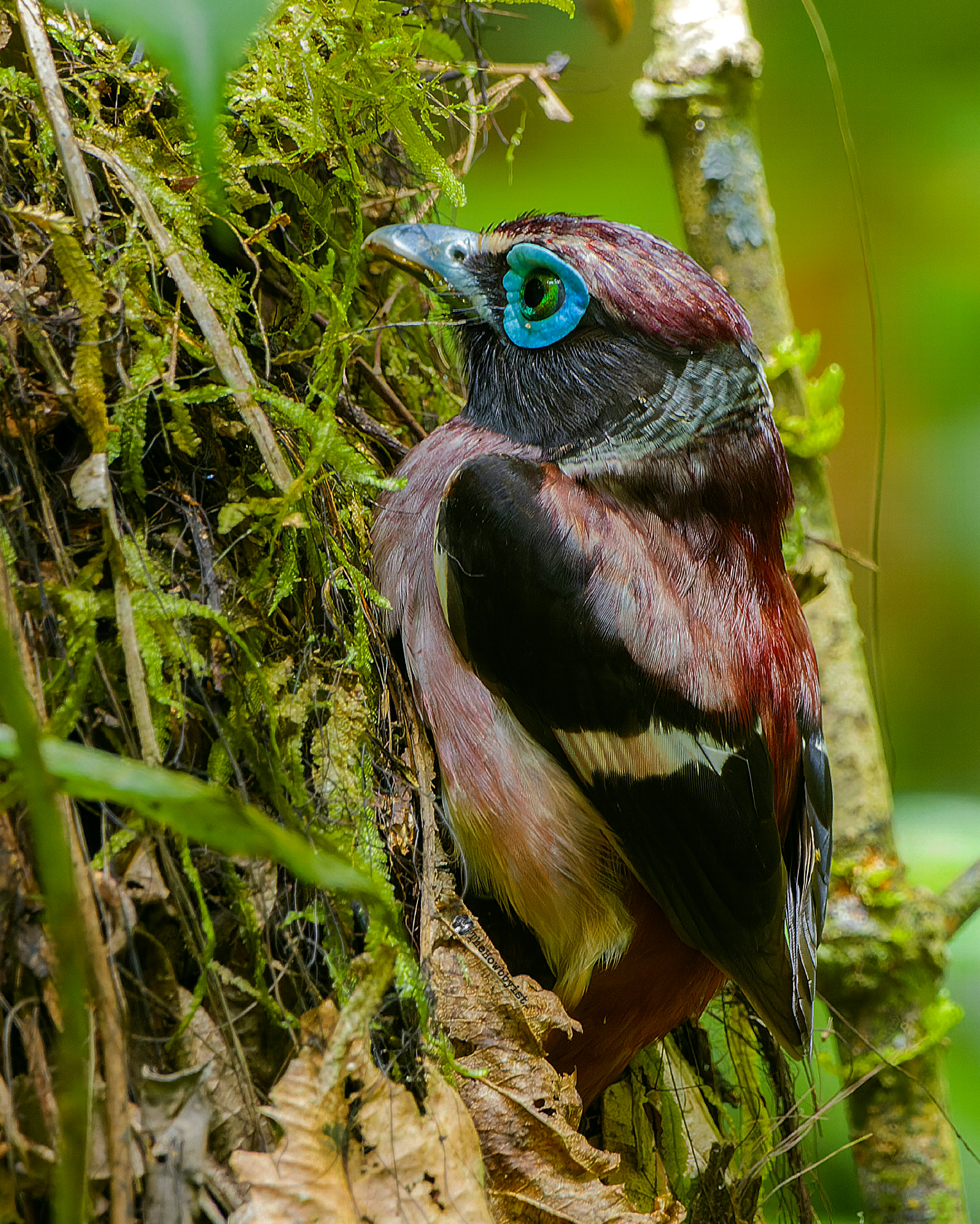
- Male

Conservation status
- Vulnerable (IUCN 3.1)

Scientific classification
- Kingdom: Animalia
- Phylum: Chordata
- Class: Aves
- Order: Passeriformes
- Family: Eurylaimidae
- Genus: Sarcophanops
- Species: S. samarensis

Binomial name
- Sarcophanops samarensis Steere, 1890

Synonyms
- Eurylaimus samarensis

= Visayan broadbill =

Species of bird

The Visayan broadbill (Sarcophanops samarensis) is a species of bird in the family Eurylaimidae where it was previously conspecific with the wattled broadbill. It is endemic to the islands of Samar, Leyte and Bohol in the central Philippines. Its natural habitat is tropical moist lowland forests. It is threatened by habitat loss.

== Description and taxonomy ==
Small, brightly coloured passerine of lowland forest on Bohol, Leyte, and Samar islands. Has a pale blue bill and deeper blue eye wattle, a black face, a streaked crown, a reddish-brown back, a dark wing with a pinkish to white wingbar, a thin white collar with some scaling above, reddish rump and tail and overall stout appearance. Underparts are white in the female and pinkish in the male. Makes short sallies for insects. Can be found in pairs, small groups, or sometimes mixed-species flocks. Unmistakable. Voice includes a plaintive whistle and a sharp tyik!.

They are sexually dimorphic in which the males have reddish-pink bellies with the females having clean white bellies. The collar of the males is reddish-pink while females have a black-and-white collar.

It is differentiated by its thinner reddish collar and white wing patch versus the wattled broadbill with its thicker white collar and yellow wing patch. It is also smaller with sizes of 14-15 versus the 16–18 cm of the wattled broadbill.

== Ecology and behavior ==
These birds are insectivorous where they forage in the middle and lower levels of the forest floor. Seen singly, in pairs or even small family groups of up to 5 birds. Seldomly joins mixed flocks.

Its nest has been recorded with main breeding season believed to be from March to May although immature birds have been recorded almost throughout the year. It builds its nest with moss

== Habitat and conservation status ==
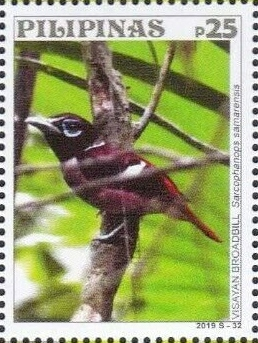
A 2019 Philippine Stamp of a male Visayan Broadbill

Its natural habitats are tropical moist lowland forest, tropical mangrove forest, and tropical moist shrubland with most records under 1,000 meters above sea level. It is often found foraging in the understorey and lower parts of the canopy.

IUCN has assessed this bird as vulnerable with the population being estimated at 2,500 to 9,999. Extensive lowland deforestation on all islands in its range is the main threat. Most remaining lowland forest that is not afforded protection leaving it vulnerable to both legal and Illegal logging, conversion into farmlands through Slash-and-burn and mining. There is only 4% forest remaining in Bohol and around 400 km^{2} of primary forest combined in Samar and Leyte with no respite in deforestation.

This occurs in a few protected areas such as Rajah Sikatuna Protected Landscape and Samar Island Natural Park however protection is lax.

Conservation actions proposed include to survey remaining habitat to better understand ecology and population size. Propose sites supporting key populations for protection and ensure that proposed protected areas receive actual protection from threats.
