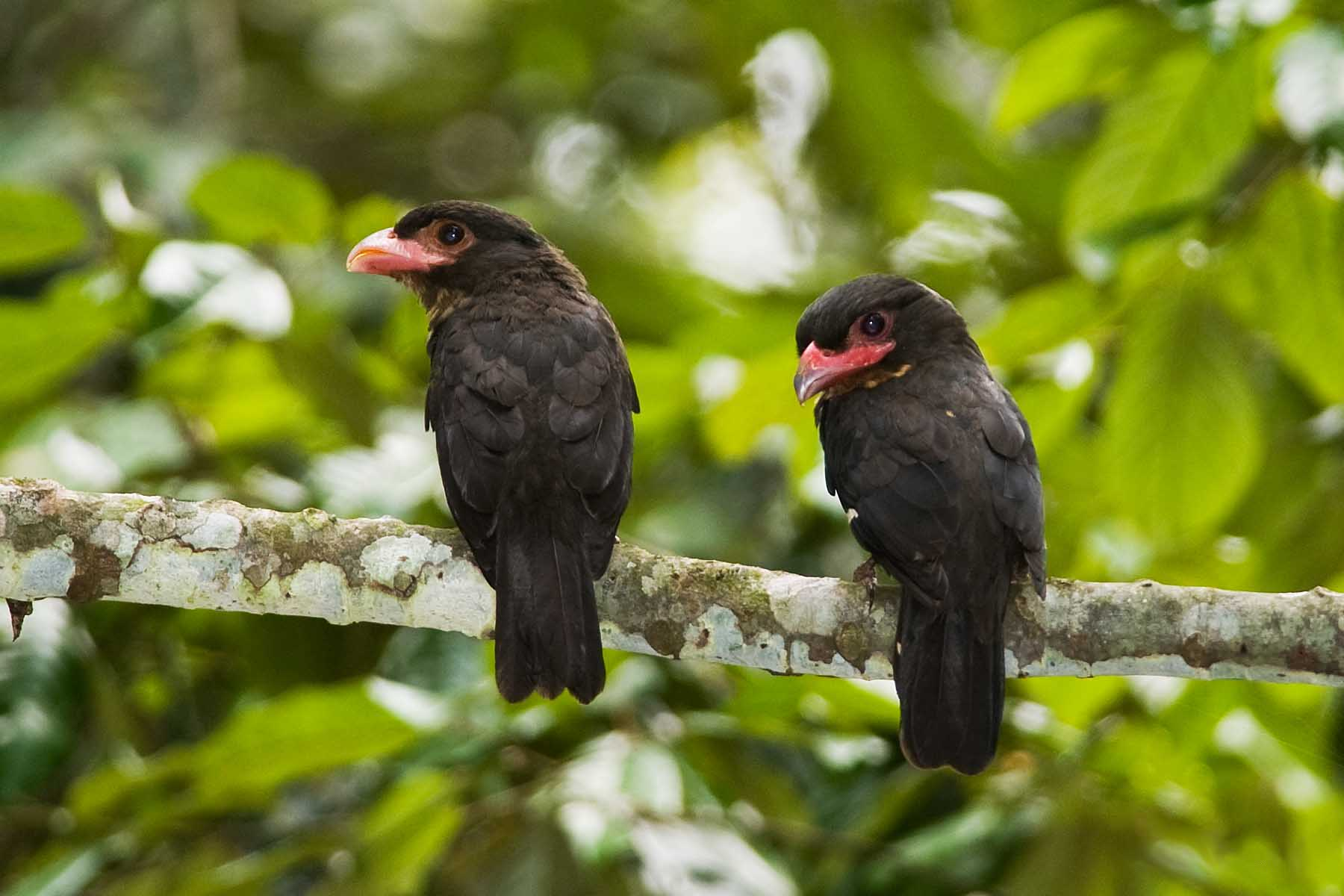

Conservation status
- Least Concern (IUCN 3.1)

Scientific classification
- Kingdom: Animalia
- Phylum: Chordata
- Class: Aves
- Order: Passeriformes
- Family: Eurylaimidae
- Genus: Corydon; Lesson, 1828
- Species: C. sumatranus

Binomial name
- Corydon sumatranus (Raffles, 1822)

= Dusky broadbill =

Species of bird

The dusky broadbill (Corydon sumatranus) is a species of bird in the family Eurylaimidae, the broadbills. It is native to Southeast Asia. It may be slowly declining due to habitat loss, especially from logging, but it has a large enough range that it is still considered to be a least-concern species.

This species, like most in its family, is an insectivore.

== Description ==
It is mostly a charcoal gray color with a pale-yellow throat and red bill. It has a brown eye ring. There is a single white band on the wings and some white bands on the underside of the tail.

== Habitat and distribution ==
The dusky broadbill is found in moist and dry tropical and subtropical broadleaf forests, tropical swamps, and cloud forests with an upper elevation limit of 2000 metres in Thailand, Myanmar, Laos, Vietnam, Cambodia, and Singapore, as well as the islands of Sumatra and Borneo.

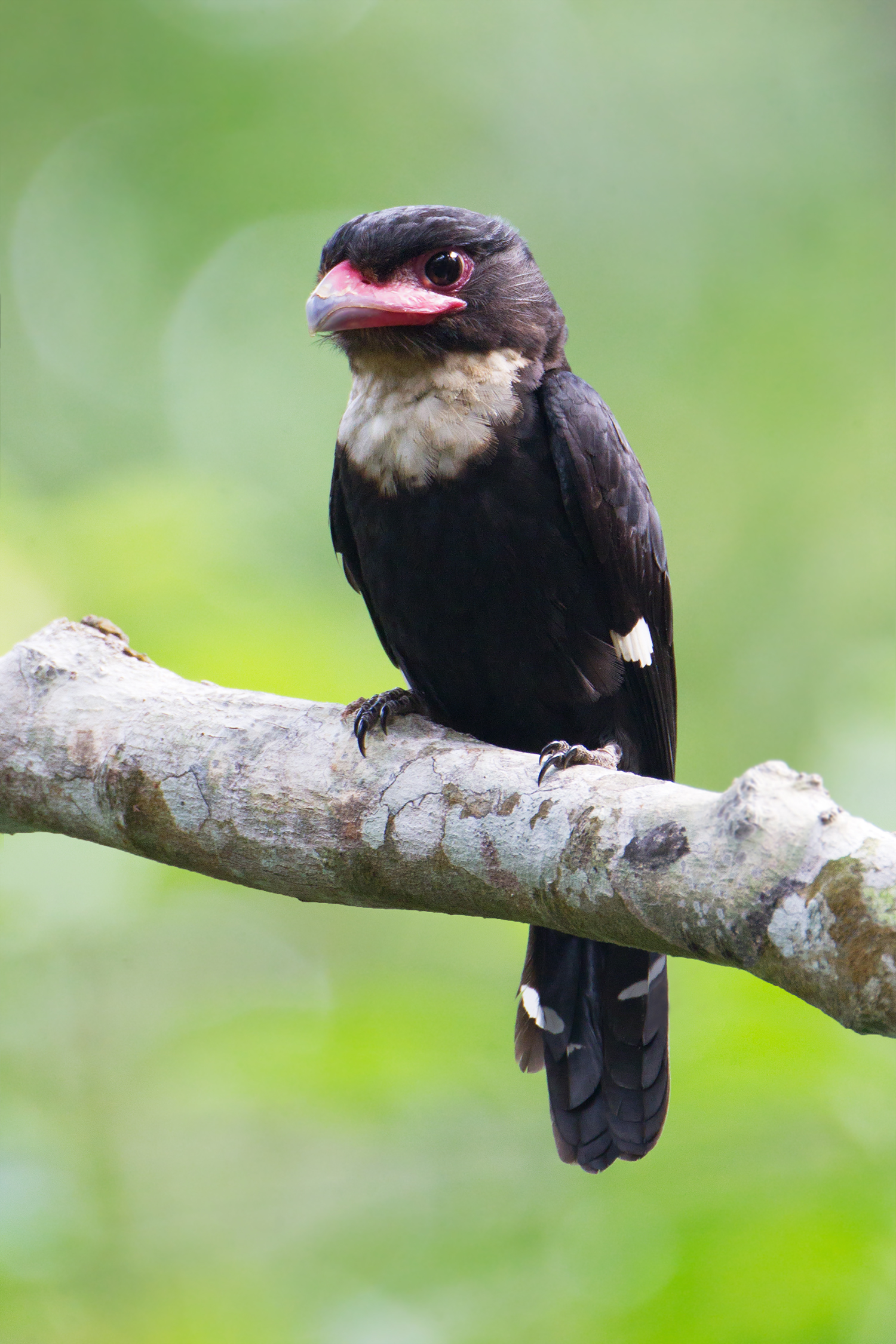
