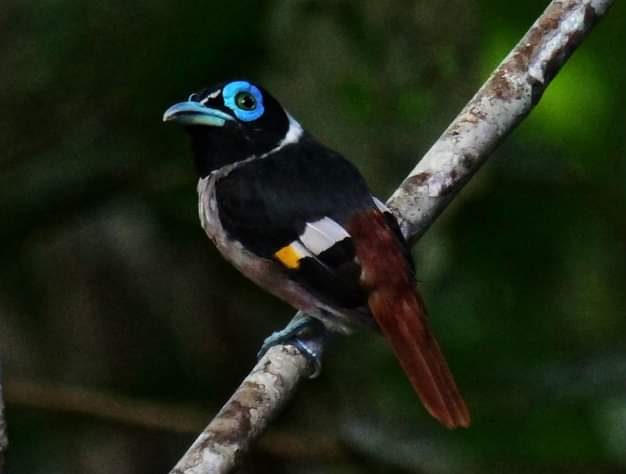
- Male ssp. steerii
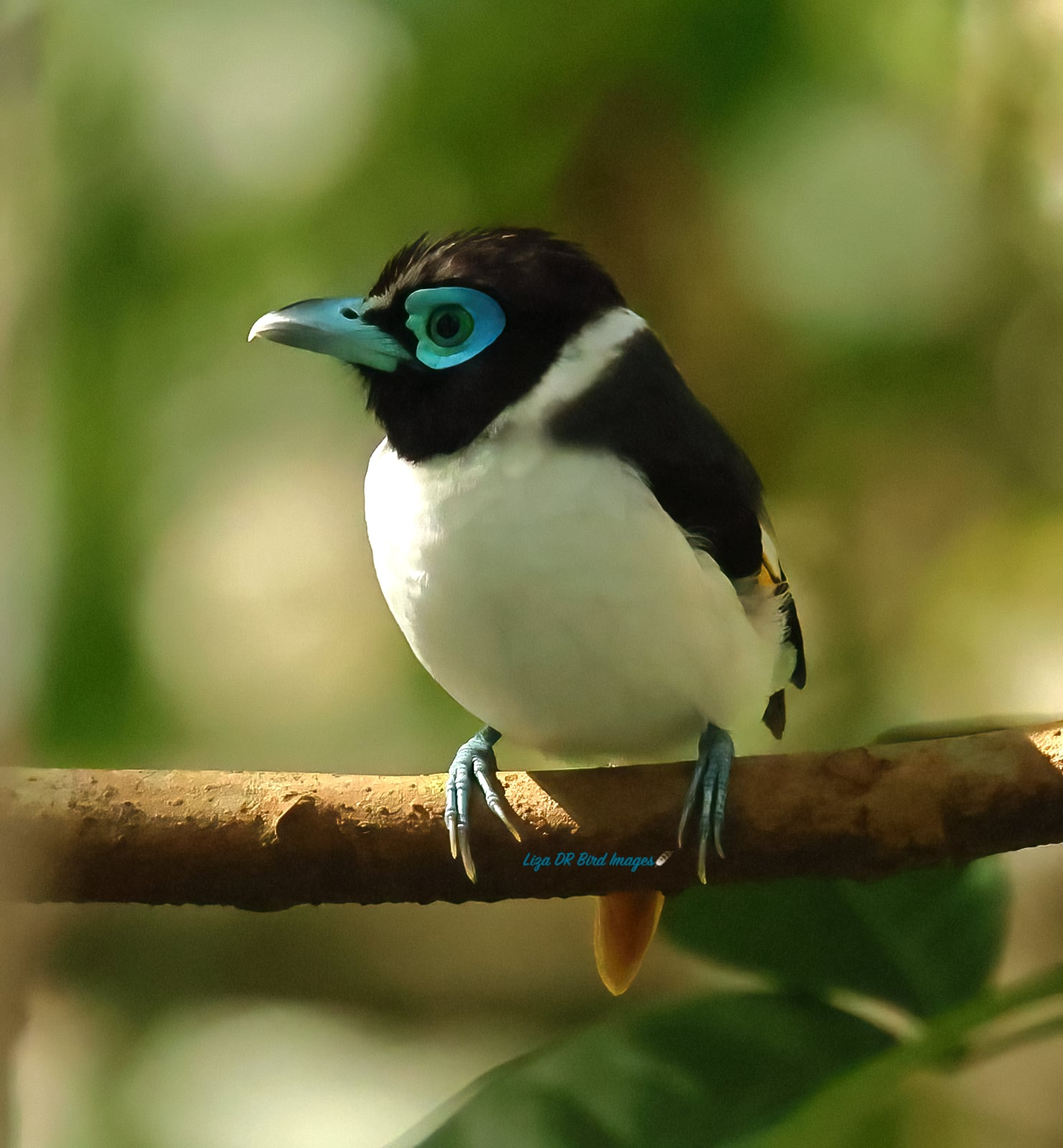
- Female ssp mayri

Conservation status
- Vulnerable (IUCN 3.1)

Scientific classification
- Kingdom: Animalia
- Phylum: Chordata
- Class: Aves
- Order: Passeriformes
- Family: Eurylaimidae
- Genus: Sarcophanops
- Species: S. steerii

Binomial name
- Sarcophanops steerii (Sharpe, 1876)

Synonyms
- Eurylaimus steerii

= Wattled broadbill =

Species of bird

The wattled broadbill, Mindanao broadbill or Mindanao wattled broadbill (Sarcophanops steerii) is a species of bird in the family Eurylaimidae where it was previously conspecific to the Visayan broadbill. It is endemic to the islands of Mindanao, Basilan, Dinagat and Siargao in the Philippines. It is one of the most striking birds in the country with its sky-blue wattle and bill and yellow wing patch. Its natural habitats are tropical moist lowland forest and occasionally tropical mangrove forest. It is threatened by habitat loss.

== Description and taxonomy ==
The wattled broadbill is described as a distinctive broadbill with prominent sky blue wattles, a maroon crown and tail, white collar, black head and wings, with a prominent white band on the tertials and a yellow band on the secondaries. The bill, legs, and feet are also bluish. They are sexually dimorphic; the males have reddish-pink bellies, while the females have clean white bellies.

Its voice is described as a metallic "chink", and its song is a plaintive whistle. It also snaps and clicks its bill while creating wing noise.

It was previously conspecific with the Visayan broadbill. It is differentiated with its white collar and bright yellow patch. It is also larger with sizes of 16–18 cm, in comparison to 14–15 cm for the Visayan broadbill.

=== Subspecies ===
Two subspecies are recognized:

- Sarcophanops steerii steerii: Central and Eastern Mindanao, Siargao and Dinagat Islands; larger and darker red on males; no recent records on Dinagat Islands
- Sarcophanops steerii mayri: Zamboanga Peninsula and Basilan; smaller and paler red on the males

These subspecies are poorly differentiated and may need further study on whether these subspecies are valid or if this species is monotypic.

== Ecology and behavior ==
These birds are insectivorous where they forage in the middle and lower levels of the forest floor. They are seen singly, in pairs, or in small family groups of up to 6 birds. They seldom joins mixed flocks.

Their main breeding season is believed to be from April to June, although immature birds have been recorded almost throughout the year.

== Habitat and conservation status ==
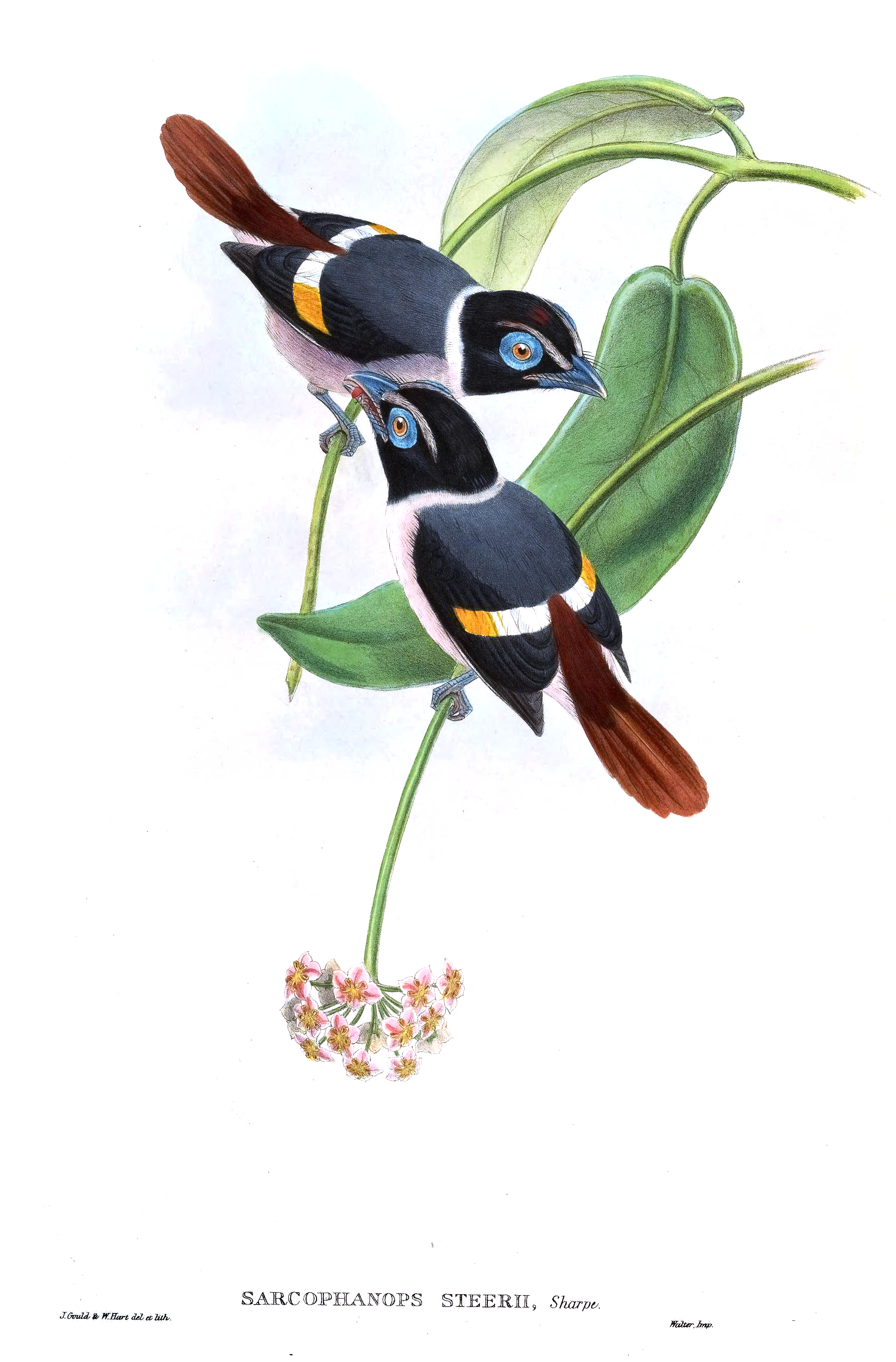
An illustration by John Gould

Its natural habitats are tropical moist lowland primary forest and well developed secondary forest up to 1,220 meters above sea level although majority of records are well below that. It appears to not be able to tolerate great amounts of forest degradation. It is known to forage in the lower levels of the forest in the understory and close to the forest floor.

IUCN has assessed this bird as vulnerable, with the population being estimated at 2,500 to 9,999. Extensive lowland deforestation on all islands in its range is the main threat. Most remaining lowland forest is not afforded protection, leaving it vulnerable to both legal and illegal logging, conversion into farmlands through slash-and-burn, and mining. There are currently no species specific conservation plans.

This occurs in a few protected areas such as Mt. Apo, Pasonanca Natural Park, and Siargao Island Protected Landscape; however, protection is lax.

Conservation actions proposed include surveying the remaining habitat to establish its current distribution, population status, and ecology.

== Gallery ==
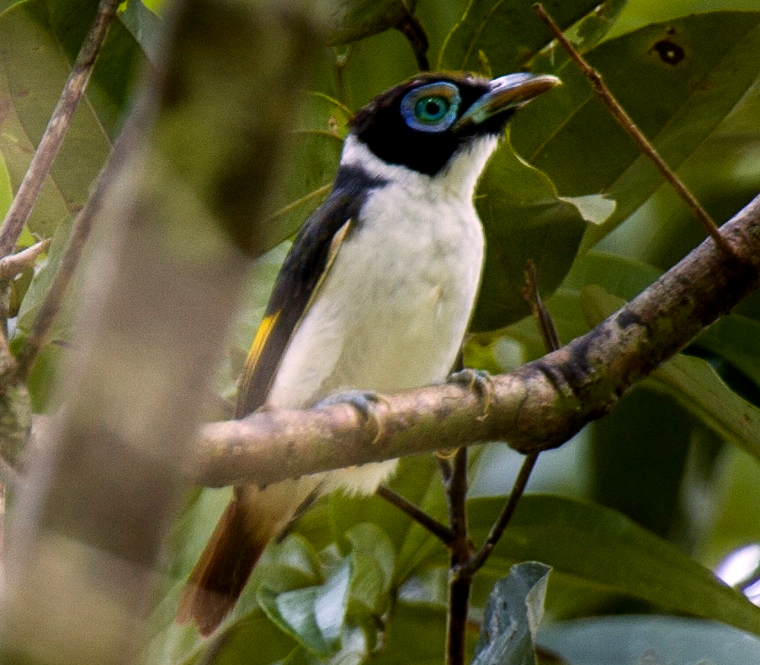
Female ssp. steerii

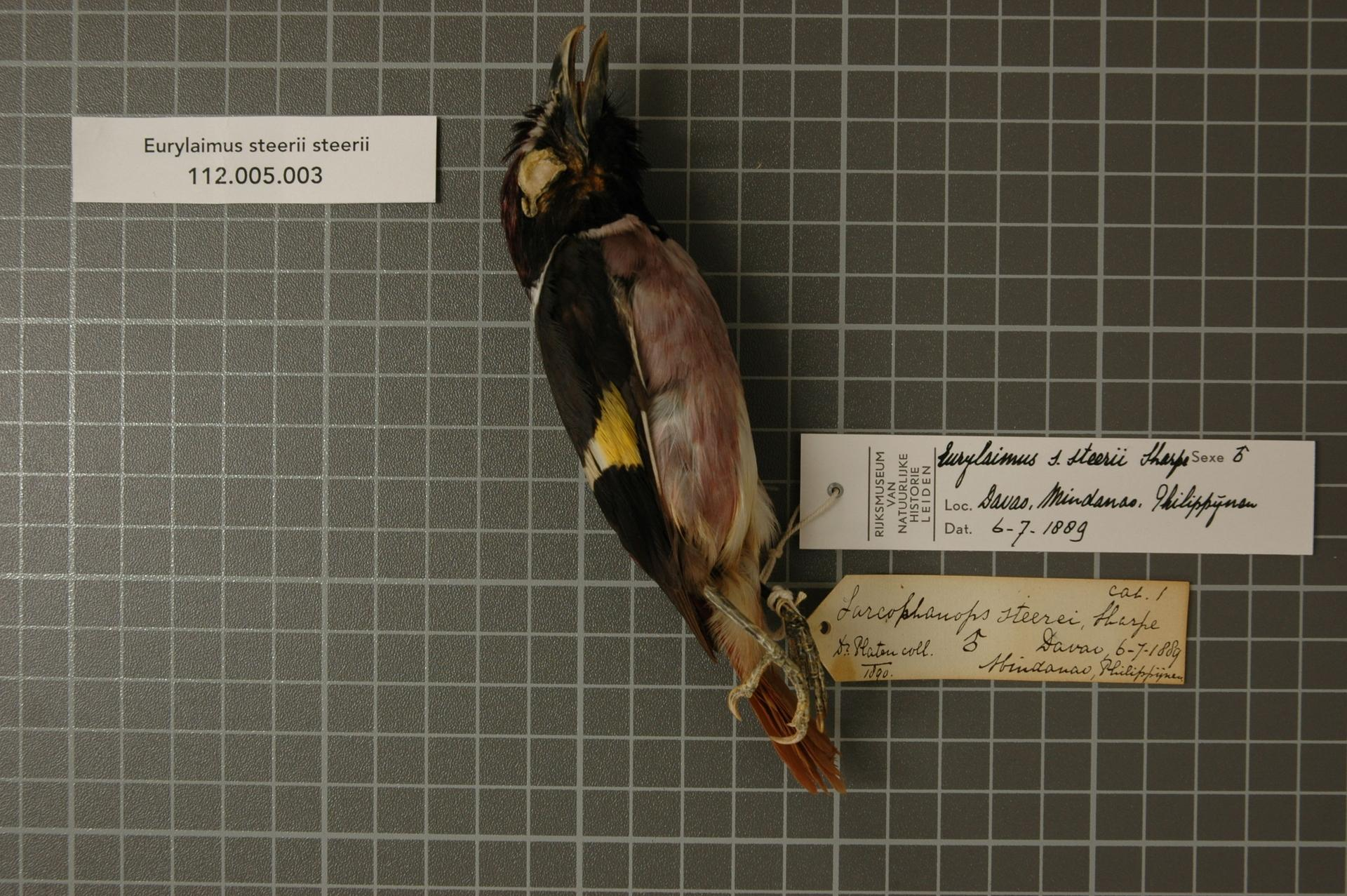
Male ssp. steerii
