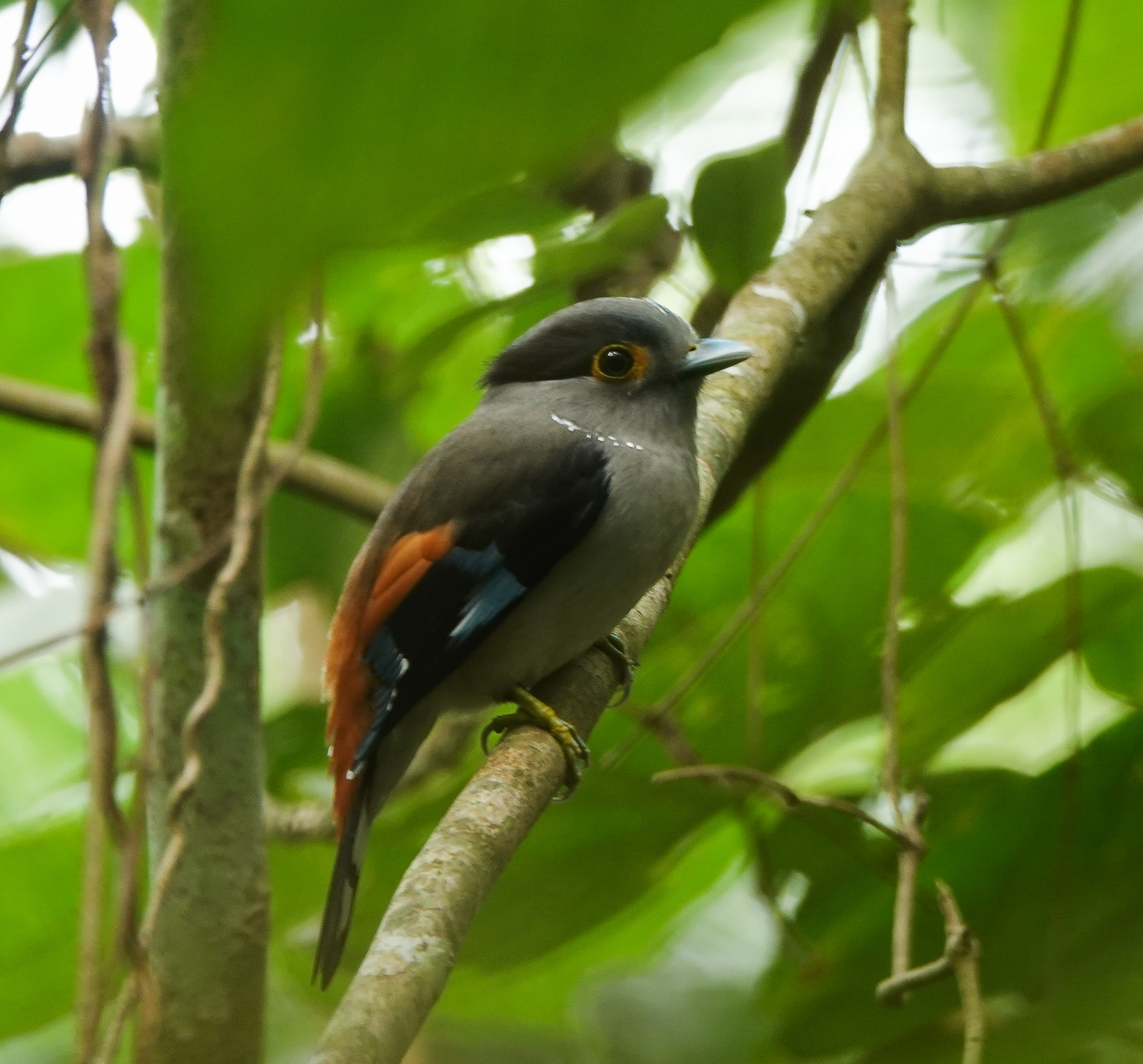

Conservation status
- Least Concern (IUCN 3.1)

Scientific classification
- Kingdom: Animalia
- Phylum: Chordata
- Class: Aves
- Order: Passeriformes
- Family: Eurylaimidae
- Genus: Serilophus
- Species: S. rubropygius

Binomial name
- Serilophus rubropygius (Hodgson, 1839)

= Grey-lored broadbill =

Species of bird

The grey-lored broadbill (Serilophus rubropygius) is a species of bird in the broadbill family, Eurylaimidae. It is found in Bangladesh, India, Bhutan, and Myanmar. It was previously also found in Nepal, but is now likely extinct there.
