= Hemiphyllodactylus cattien =

Scientific classification
- Kingdom: Animalia
- Phylum: Chordata
- Class: Reptilia
- Order: Squamata
- Suborder: Gekkota
- Family: Gekkonidae
- Genus: Hemiphyllodactylus
- Species: H. cattien

Binomial name
- Hemiphyllodactylus cattien Yushchenko, Grismer, Bragin, Dac & Poyarkov, 2023

Species of reptile

External image
- Images at iNaturalist

Hemiphyllodactylus cattien, provisionally called the "Cat Tien slender gecko" is an endemic species of gecko found southern Vietnam at Cat Tien National Park.

== Habitat and description ==
Hemiphyllodactylus cattien is approximately 35 mm long and is distinguishable by "unsheathed" claws and a relatively triangular head; the body is described as grey with dark-brown and white spots. It is most closely related to H. indosobrinus from Laos, but has fewer dorsal scales (20 versus 30) and more than H. flaviventris (with 16-18 dorsal scales) from Thailand. This species is considered unusual amongst "slender geckos" in that its type locality, Cat Tien National Park, is lowland seasonal tropical forest rather than more mountainous habitat. The authors describe how the discovery of this "secretive" arboreal species, "further emphasizes the need for continued re-sampling of survey sites already considered to be well-explored".
