= Tony Whitten =

British conservationist, zoologist, and herpetologist

Anthony John Whitten (10 April 1953 – 29 November 2017) was a British conservationist, zoologist, and herpetologist. He was a senior adviser at Fauna and Flora International, where he was regional director for Asia Pacific, and was a former biodiversity specialist with the World Bank. He co-authored several books on the ecology of Southeast Asia and published over 100 field guides in local languages. Born in Dulwich, London, Whitten attended Dulwich College and the University of Southampton. In graduate school he spent two years studying gibbons on the Indonesian island of Siberut, earning his PhD from Cambridge in 1980. He and his wife, zoologist Jane E. J. Whitten, later lived in Indonesia for 10 years. He established a working group on karst ecosystems for the International Union for Conservation of Nature (IUCN), and in 2016 was part of a research team that discovered 15 new species of geckos in Myanmar. He died in 2017, aged 64, as the result of a car collision while bicycling. He is commemorated in the scientific names of at least 13 species, including the geckos Hemiphyllodactylus tonywhitteni and Cnemaspis whittenorum.
