= Larut dwarf gecko =

Conservation status
- Data Deficient (IUCN 3.1)

Scientific classification
- Kingdom: Animalia
- Phylum: Chordata
- Class: Reptilia
- Order: Squamata
- Suborder: Gekkota
- Family: Gekkonidae
- Genus: Hemiphyllodactylus
- Species: H. larutensis

Binomial name
- Hemiphyllodactylus larutensis (Boulenger, 1900)

Synonyms
- Gehyra larutensis; Peropus larutensis

Species of lizard

The Larut dwarf gecko (Hemiphyllodactylus larutensis) is a species of gecko. It is endemic to Peninsular Malaysia. It is sometimes considered conspecific with Hemiphyllodactylus harterti.
