= John Shortt =

Anglo-Indian physician (1822-1899)

John Shortt (26 February 1822 – 24 April 1889) was an Anglo-Indian medical doctor who served in the Madras Presidency in southern India. He conducted research on snake venoms and wrote on a variety of other subjects including anthropology, agriculture, and animal husbandry. A species of shieldtail snake endemic to the Shevaroy Hills is named after him, Uropeltis shorttii.

== Biography ==
Shortt was the son of Rose (1789-1841) and John Shortt (died November 9, 1837). Shortt (senior) had joined the Madras Army as an ensign in 1760, became a Major in 1778 and retired 'invalided' as conductor of ordinance at Vellore. Shortt (junior) was christened on 20 May 1822 at Arcot. He may have been among the first students trained in Madras as apothecaries before he joined the East India Company Service in Madras as an Assistant Apothecary on 20 January 1846. He was then sent for training in medicine to Aberdeen, and received a MD from King's College in 1854 apart from qualifying MRCS and LSA. He was supported by a sum of £400 from an officer who had been saved from cholera by Shortt. An introduction letter from Hugh Cleghorn to J.H. Balfour noted that Shortt was an "Anglo-Indian" and that allowance be made for his "colour and manners." He also received a degree in veterinary medicine, becoming a member of the college of veterinary surgeons, Edinburgh in 1854. Returning to India, he was appointed assistant surgeon at Madras in September 1854. He served as a superintendent of vaccination for a while before being promoted Surgeon in 1866, Surgeon Major in 1873, and finally retired on 12 February 1878. He moved to Yercaud where he remained until his death. He was elected Fellow of the Linnean Society in 1860. His proposers included John J. Bennet, John Edward Gray, George Robert Gray, William Baird, Thomas Moore and Thomas Spencer Cobbold.

Shortt married Isabella née Cursett (died 25 May 1854 aged 22) in Madras in 1848. A daughter Isabella married John Archibald Duncan McDougall in Madras in 1872. His second wife Ellen Julia Annie née Blyth (1843 - 8 July 1865) was buried at St Mary's Cemetery, Madras. He married Annie Julia Henrietta née Rogers (1851-1909) on 9 September 1875 at Bangalore.

== Scholarly contributions ==
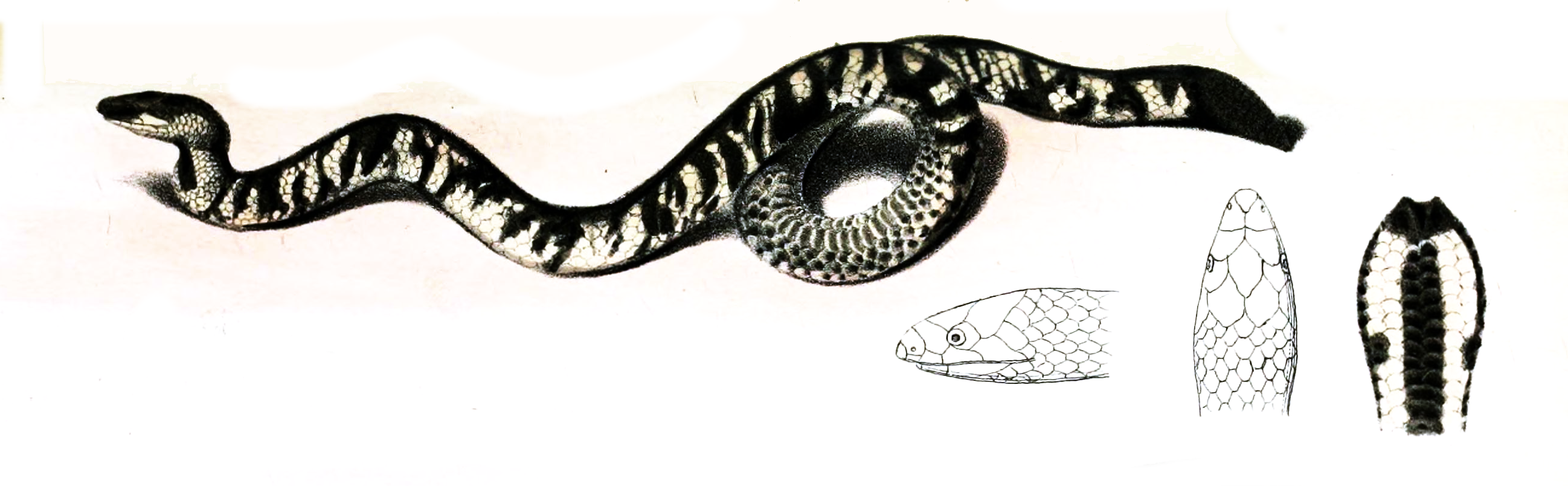
Uropeltis shorttii

While working as a superintendent of vaccines, Shortt designed a modified vaccination needle. He also translated William Campbell Maclean's treatise on smallpox into Tamil in 1857 and into Telugu in 1858. Shortt took a keen interest in snakes and snakebites from at least 1863 onwards. He conducted snake envenomation experiments on dogs and other animals. He examined folk remedies such as snake stones and concluded that “There is no truth in the virtues attributed to the snake stone, for it has neither the power to absorb or otherwise neutralize the snake poison from the wound.” He collected specimens of snakes, and collaborated with others who took an interest in snakebite such as Joseph Fayrer to whom he sent specimens of Trimeresurus annamalaiensis. He also sent specimens to Richard Henry Beddome who described Uropeltis shorttii, a shieldtail snake endemic to the Shevaroys.

Shortt took an interest in the people of the regions that he worked in, writing about aboriginal tribes, festivals, Armenian settlers, devdasis, and in later life took an interest in physical anthropology. He sent 20 skulls belonging to members of the Maravar tribe to the Anthropological Society of Paris. While posted to Ganjam as a physician to the Great Trigonometrical Survey around 1855-56, he studied the local tribes. He also wrote extensively on medical topics mainly in the Madras Quarterly (later Monthly) Journal of Medical Science. He also treated animals in his practice, and maintained indigenous breeds of livestock and studied them. This resulted in his Manual of Indian Cattle and Sheep first published in 1876 and went into two further editions.

Natural history was a major interest, he described a branching palm, the nest of the arboreal Crematogaster sp. ants, a note on the Vedanthangal heronry, plants used as food during famines, and proposed poisoning tigers in Sathyamangalam with strychnine.

=== Writings ===
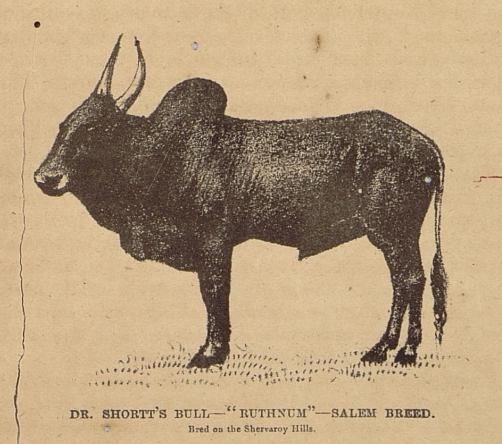
A native bull raised by Shortt at Yercaud

An incomplete list of his publications include:

- (1860). An Essay on the Culture and Manufacture of Indigo. Madras:Smith. Scanned copy, Wellcome archives
- (1863). Letter to Secretary of the Zoological Society on the viper Daboia elegans. Annals & Magazine of Natural History 11 (ser 3): 383–5.
- (1864). On the Domber [a caste of acrobats]. Journal of the Anthropological Society of London 2: clxxxix–cxci.
- (1864). A Hand-Book to Coffee Planting in Southern India. Madras:Pharoah & Co.
- (1864). Report on the Rot in Sheep. (Proc. Madras Government, Revenue Department, July 13, 1864.)
- (1864). Notes on differences in weight and stature of Europeans and some natives of India. Transactions of the Ethnological Society of London 2: 213–6.
- (1865). An account of some of the rude tribes, the supposed aborigines of Southern India. Transactions of the Ethnological Society of London 3: 373–94.
- Shortt, John (1865). "An Account of a Wild Tribe Inhabiting Some Parts of Orissa, and Known as "Juags" and "Bathuas", or "Leaf Wearers"". Journal of the Anthropological Society of London. 3: cxxxiv–cxli. doi:10.2307/3025316. ISSN 1356-0131. JSTOR 3025316.
- (1865). A Popular Lecture on Vaccination. Madras.
- (1865). On the Febrifuge properties of the Thevetia nerifolia. The Madras Quarterly Journal of Medical Science. 294-305.
- (1866). Notice of a double-headed watersnake. Proceedings of the Linnean Society. 9:49-50.
- (1866). Description of a living Microcephale. Journal of the Anthropological Society, No. 15:181.
- (1866). An account of a religious festival, comprising leaf-wearing, and the hanging, or cheddul. Transactions of the Ethnological Society of London 4: 333–8.
- (1867). An account of the Sclerotium stipitatum (Berk. et Curr.) of Southern India. Journal of the Linnean Society Botany 9: 417–9. [Probably Termitomyces]
- (1867). The fishermen of Southern India. Transactions of the Ethnological Society of London 5: 193–201.
- (1868). A contribution to the ethnology of Jeypore [Orissa]. Transactions of the Ethnological Society of London 6: 264–81, 364.
- (1869). On the wild tribes of Southern India. Transactions of the Ethnological Society of London 7: 186–94.
- (ed) (1868). An Account of the Tribes of the Neilgherries.
- Shortt, John (1869). "Experiments Connected with Small-Pox, Inoculation, and Vaccination". Transactions. Epidemiological Society of London. 3 (Pt 1): 148–165. ISSN 0951-4430. PMC 5523613. PMID 29418964.
- (1870). The Armenians of Southern India. Journal of Anthropology 1:180–7.
- Shortt, John (1870). "Description of Crania from India". Journal of the Anthropological Society of London. 8: xvii–xx. doi:10.2307/3025168. ISSN 1356-0131. JSTOR 3025168.
- [?1870]. The tuckatoo and bish kopra.
- (1870). Cases of snake-bite continued. Madras Monthly Journal of Medical Science 2: 7–9; 101–110; 348–50.
- (1870). Note on the infection and propagation of measles. Madras Monthly Journal of Medical Science 2: 177–9.
- (1870). Antidote to the cobra poison. Madras Monthly Journal of Medical Science 2: 249–52.
- (1870). Habits and Manners of Marvar Tribes of India. Memoirs Anthropological Institution of London 3:201-215. [Notes the 20 skulls sent to the Anthropological Society of Paris]
- (1870). The Bayadère; or, dancing girls of Southern India. Memoirs Anthropological Institution of London 3: 182–94. [describes devadasis]
- Shortt, John (1870). "Case of snake (cobra) bite successfully treated by suction, liquor pottasae, and brandy". The Lancet. 95 (2433): 540–542. doi:10.1016/S0140-6736(02)66219-1.
- (ed) (1870[–4]). The Hill Ranges of Southern India, Parts II–IV. Madras: Higginbotham.
- (1871). On branched palms in Southern India. Journal of the Linnean Society Botany 11:14–7.
- (1871). Temporary sterility the result of disease. Madras Monthly Journal of Medical Science 3:5–10.
- (1871). Review of cases of snake-bite. Madras Monthly Journal of Medical Science 3:81–91.
- (1871). The cobra. Madras Monthly Journal of Medical Science 3:176–8.
- (1871). Lusus naturae. Madras Monthly Journal of Medical Science 3:241–6.
- (1871). On the protective power of vaccination. Madras Monthly Journal of Medical Science 3: 351–4.
- (1871). Case of premature labour occurring at the eighth month, arrested after the setting in of the second stage; and subsequent delivery at the full period of gestation. Madras Monthly Journal of Medical Science 3: 420–1.
- (1872). Experiments with snake (cobra) poison commenced at Combaconum, in the Tanjore District, on the 21 st September 1869. Madras Monthly Journal of Medical Science 4: 16–32; 165–76; 346–54; 426–32; 5: 199–204; 266–8.
- (1872). A brief account of the tusseh silk-worm, accompanied with drawings of the insect. Madras Monthly Journal of Medical Science 5: 113–7.
- (1872). Cases of snake-bite. Madras Monthly Journal of Medical Science 5:359–63.
- (1873). The Kojahs [eunuchs] of Southern India. Journal of the Anthropological Institution of Great Britain and Ireland 2: 402–7.
- (1874). A brief account of three microcephales. Journal of the Anthropological Institution of Great Britain and Ireland 3: 265.
- (1874). A Manual of Vaccination for the Pupils of the Vaccination Department, Madras.
- (1875). Report on the lists of snakes received from the Collectorates of the Madras Presidency.
- (1876). A Guide in Tamil for the People’s Park, Madras.
- (1876). Description of a needle-vaccinator. The Lancet, 1876:677-678.
- (1876, 1885, 1889). A Manual of Indian Cattle and Sheep, their Breeds, Management and Diseases. Madras: Higginbotham & Co.
- (ed) (1884). Forestry in South India by Major-General Henry Rhodes Morgan. Madras: Higginbotham & Co.
- (1888). A Monograph on the Cocoanut Palm, or Cocos Nucifera. Madras:Hill.
- (1889). A Manual of Indian Agriculture. Madras: Higginbotham.
