= Spotted dwarf gecko =

There are three species of lizard named spotted dwarf gecko:

- Hemiphyllodactylus bintik
- Lygodactylus ocellatus
- Lepidoblepharis hoogmoedi
