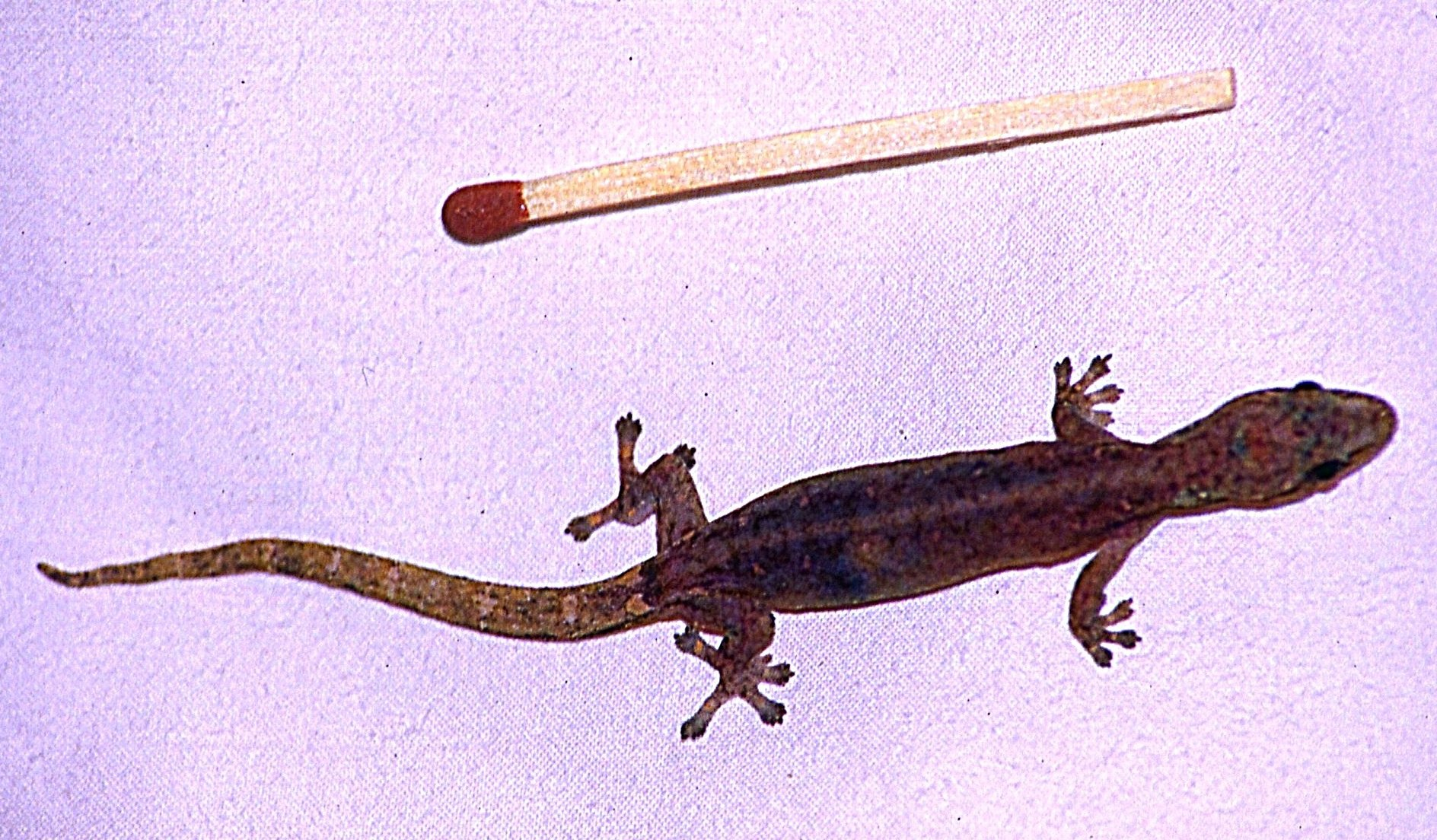
- Hemiphyllodactylus typus

Scientific classification
- Kingdom: Animalia
- Phylum: Chordata
- Class: Reptilia
- Order: Squamata
- Suborder: Gekkota
- Family: Gekkonidae
- Genus: Hemiphyllodactylus
- Species: H. typus

Binomial name
- Hemiphyllodactylus typus Bleeker, 1860

= Hemiphyllodactylus typus =

Species of lizard

Hemiphyllodactylus typus, also known as the Indopacific tree gecko, Indopacific slender gecko, or common dwarf gecko, is a species of gecko found in South Asia, Southeast Asia, and East Asia, and some islands in the Indian and Pacific Oceans.

== Distribution ==
India (Shevaroy Hills, Anaimalai, Nilgiri Hills), Nicobar Islands, Sri Lanka, Indochina, Vietnam, Chapa/Tongking, Thailand, W Malaysia, Singapore, Oceania, Burma, Philippines (Panay), Indonesia (Borneo, Sumatra, Java, Bali, Sumbawa, Komodo), China, Taiwan, New Guinea, New Caledonia, Loyalty Islands, Tonga, Marquesas Islands, Society Islands, Pitcairn Islands, Solomon Islands, Fiji Islands (Vanua Levu, Viti Levu), Mauritius, Reunion, Rodrigues (fide F. Glaw, pers. comm.) Introduced to Ryukyu Islands (Japan), Introduced to Iriomotejima Island, Introduced into the USA (Hawaii)

Type locality: "Agam" [West-Sumatra] [Kluge 1968] and "Goenong Parong (Java)" [= Gunung Parang, West-Java] (Wermuth 1965)
