= Cnemaspis whittenorum =

Scientific classification
- Kingdom: Animalia
- Phylum: Chordata
- Class: Reptilia
- Order: Squamata
- Suborder: Gekkota
- Family: Gekkonidae
- Genus: Cnemaspis
- Species: C. whittenorum

Binomial name
- Cnemaspis whittenorum Das, 2005

Species of lizard

Cnemaspis whittenorum is a species of gecko, a lizard in the family Gekkonidae. The species is endemic to the Mentawai Islands in Indonesia.

== Etymology ==
The specific name, whittenorum (genitive plural), is in honor of zoologists Anthony John Whitten and Jane E. J. Whitten, husband and wife.

== Description ==
C. whittenorum is a small species. Maximum recorded snout-to-vent length (SVL) is 32 mm (1.3 in).

== Reproduction ==
C. whittenorum is oviparous.
