= Hemiphyllodactylus uga =

Scientific classification
- Kingdom: Animalia
- Phylum: Chordata
- Class: Reptilia
- Order: Squamata
- Suborder: Gekkota
- Family: Gekkonidae
- Genus: Hemiphyllodactylus
- Species: H. uga

Binomial name
- Hemiphyllodactylus uga Grismer, Wood, Thura, Zin, Quah, Murdoch, Grismer, Li, Kyaw, & Lwin, 2018

Species of lizard

Hemiphyllodactylus uga, also known as Uga's slender gecko, is a species of gecko. It is endemic to Myanmar.
