= Palauan slender gecko =

Conservation status
- Least Concern (IUCN 3.1)

Scientific classification
- Kingdom: Animalia
- Phylum: Chordata
- Class: Reptilia
- Order: Squamata
- Suborder: Gekkota
- Family: Gekkonidae
- Genus: Hemiphyllodactylus
- Species: H. ganoklonis

Binomial name
- Hemiphyllodactylus ganoklonis Zug, 2010

Species of lizard

The Palauan slender gecko (Hemiphyllodactylus ganoklonis) is a species of gecko. It is endemic to Palau.
