= Sumatran slender gecko =

Scientific classification
- Kingdom: Animalia
- Phylum: Chordata
- Class: Reptilia
- Order: Squamata
- Suborder: Gekkota
- Family: Gekkonidae
- Genus: Hemiphyllodactylus
- Species: H. margarethae

Binomial name
- Hemiphyllodactylus margarethae Brongersma, 1931

Species of lizard

The Sumatran slender gecko (Hemiphyllodactylus margarethae) is a species of gecko. It is endemic to Sumatra.
