= Hemiphyllodactylus longlingensis =

Scientific classification
- Kingdom: Animalia
- Phylum: Chordata
- Class: Reptilia
- Order: Squamata
- Suborder: Gekkota
- Family: Gekkonidae
- Genus: Hemiphyllodactylus
- Species: H. longlingensis

Binomial name
- Hemiphyllodactylus longlingensis (Zhou & Liu, 1981)

Synonyms
- Hemiphyllodactylus yunnanensis longlingensis

Species of lizard

Hemiphyllodactylus longlingensis, also known as the Longling slender gecko, Longling gypsy gecko, or Longling dwarf gecko, is a species of gecko. It is found in China (Yunnan). It is named after its type locality, Longling.
