= Hemiphyllodactylus zhutangxiangensis =

Scientific classification
- Kingdom: Animalia
- Phylum: Chordata
- Class: Reptilia
- Order: Squamata
- Suborder: Gekkota
- Family: Gekkonidae
- Genus: Hemiphyllodactylus
- Species: H. zhutangxiangensis

Binomial name
- Hemiphyllodactylus zhutangxiangensis Agung, Grismer, Grismer, Quah, Chornelia, Lu, & Hughes, 2021

Species of lizard

Hemiphyllodactylus zhutangxiangensis is a species of gecko. It is endemic to Yunnan (China). It is named after its type locality, Zhutang Township (simplified Chinese: 竹塘乡; traditional Chinese: 竹塘鄉; pinyin: Zhútáng Xiāng).
