= Zug's slender gecko =

Conservation status
- Data Deficient (IUCN 3.1)

Scientific classification
- Kingdom: Animalia
- Phylum: Chordata
- Class: Reptilia
- Order: Squamata
- Suborder: Gekkota
- Family: Gekkonidae
- Genus: Hemiphyllodactylus
- Species: H. zugi

Binomial name
- Hemiphyllodactylus zugi Nguyen, Lehmann, Le Duc, Duong, Bonkowski, & Ziegler, 2013

Species of lizard

Zug's slender gecko (Hemiphyllodactylus zugi) is a species of gecko. It is endemic to northern Vietnam.
