= Hemiphyllodactylus zalonicus =

Scientific classification
- Domain: Eukaryota
- Kingdom: Animalia
- Phylum: Chordata
- Class: Reptilia
- Order: Squamata
- Infraorder: Gekkota
- Family: Gekkonidae
- Genus: Hemiphyllodactylus
- Species: H. zalonicus

Binomial name
- Hemiphyllodactylus zalonicus Grismer, Chit, Pawangkhanant, Nazarov, Zaw, & Poyarkov, 2021

Species of lizard

Hemiphyllodactylus zalonicus, also known as the Mt. Zalon slender gecko, is a species of gecko. It is endemic to Myanmar.
