= Hemiphyllodactylus serpispecus =

Scientific classification
- Kingdom: Animalia
- Phylum: Chordata
- Class: Reptilia
- Order: Squamata
- Suborder: Gekkota
- Family: Gekkonidae
- Genus: Hemiphyllodactylus
- Species: H. serpispecus

Binomial name
- Hemiphyllodactylus serpispecus Eliades, Phimmachak, Sivongxay, Siler, & Stuart, 2019

Species of lizard

Hemiphyllodactylus serpispecus is a species of gecko. It is endemic to Laos.
