= Hemiphyllodactylus pinlaungensis =

Scientific classification
- Domain: Eukaryota
- Kingdom: Animalia
- Phylum: Chordata
- Class: Reptilia
- Order: Squamata
- Infraorder: Gekkota
- Family: Gekkonidae
- Genus: Hemiphyllodactylus
- Species: H. pinlaungensis

Binomial name
- Hemiphyllodactylus pinlaungensis Grismer, Wood, Quah, Thura, Oaks, & Lin, 2020

Species of lizard

The Pinlaung slender gecko (Hemiphyllodactylus pinlaungensis) is a species of gecko. It is endemic to Myanmar.
