= Hemiphyllodactylus bonkowskii =

Scientific classification
- Kingdom: Animalia
- Phylum: Chordata
- Class: Reptilia
- Order: Squamata
- Suborder: Gekkota
- Family: Gekkonidae
- Genus: Hemiphyllodactylus
- Species: H. bonkowskii

Binomial name
- Hemiphyllodactylus bonkowskii Nguyen, Do, Ngo, Pham, Pham, Le, & Ziegler, 2020

Species of lizard

Bonkowski's slender gecko (Hemiphyllodactylus bonkowskii) is a species of gecko. It is endemic to Vietnam.
