= Hemiphyllodactylus dalatensis =

Scientific classification
- Kingdom: Animalia
- Phylum: Chordata
- Class: Reptilia
- Order: Squamata
- Suborder: Gekkota
- Family: Gekkonidae
- Genus: Hemiphyllodactylus
- Species: H. dalatensis

Binomial name
- Hemiphyllodactylus dalatensis Do, Nguyen, Le, Pham, Ziegler, & Nguyen, 2021

Species of lizard

Hemiphyllodactylus dalatensis is a species of gecko. It is endemic to Vietnam.
