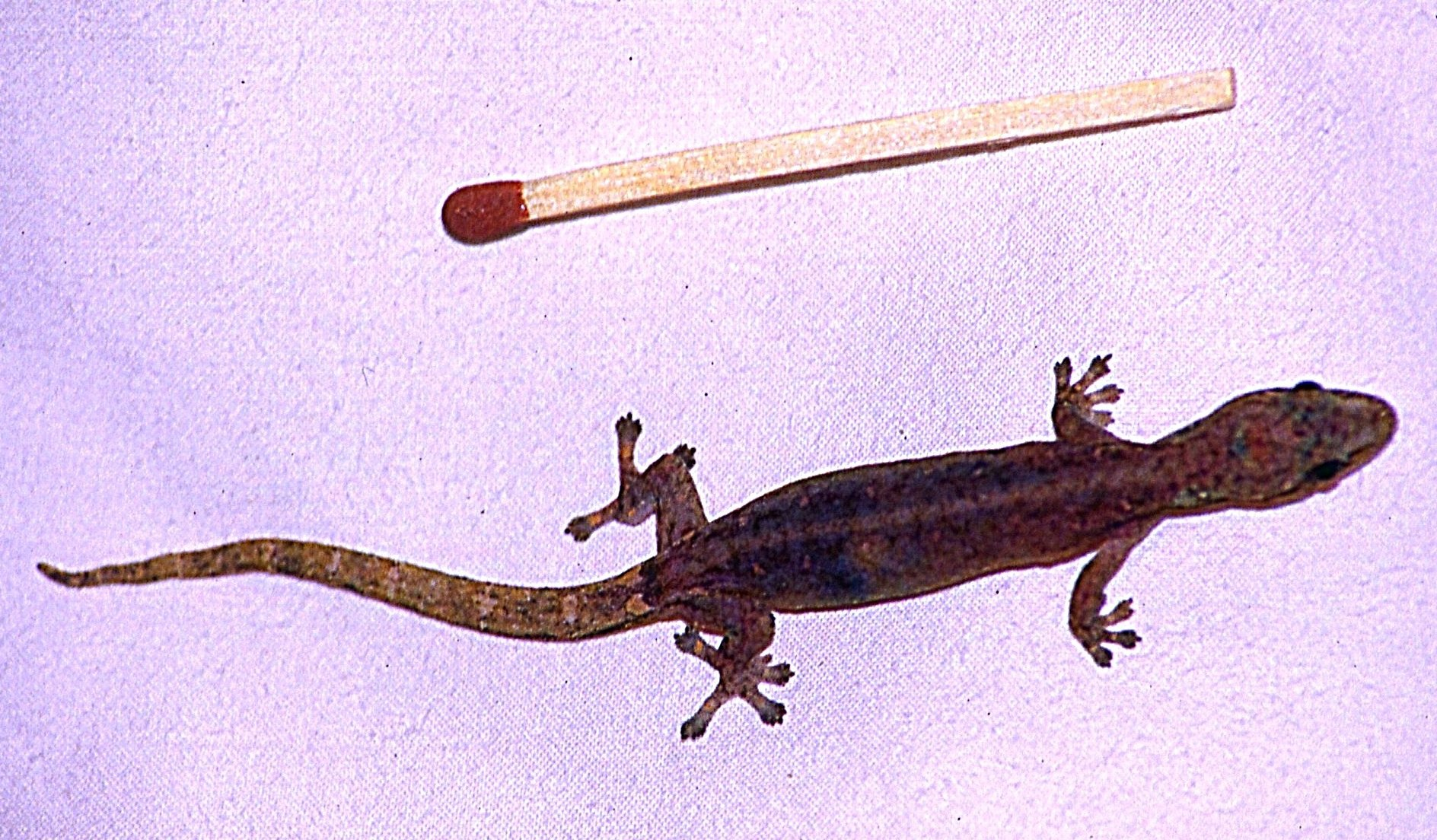
- Hemiphyllodactylus typus
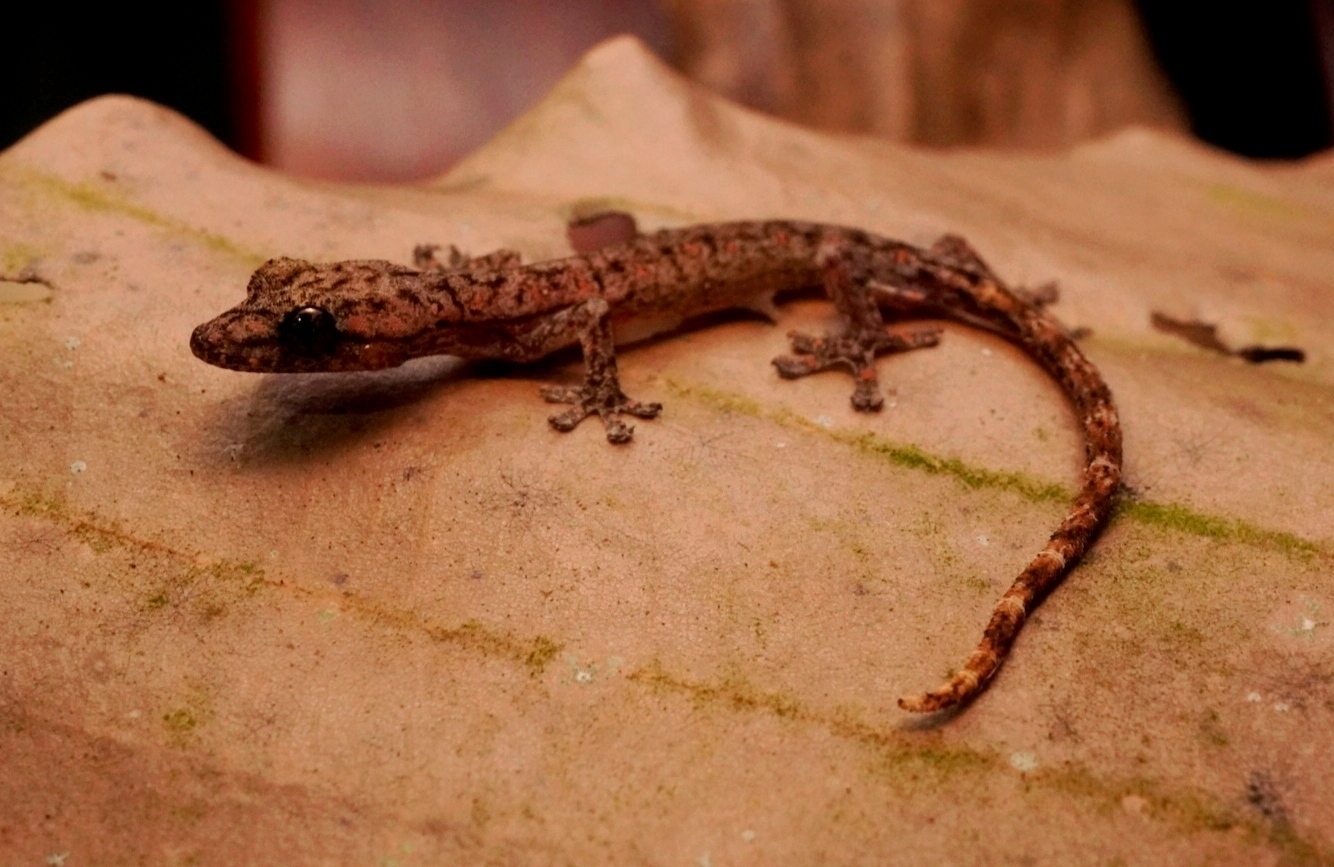
- Hemiphyllodactylus cattien in Vietnam

Scientific classification
- Kingdom: Animalia
- Phylum: Chordata
- Class: Reptilia
- Order: Squamata
- Suborder: Gekkota
- Family: Gekkonidae
- Subfamily: Gekkoninae
- Genus: Hemiphyllodactylus; Bleeker, 1860

= Hemiphyllodactylus =

Genus of lizards

Hemiphyllodactylus (from Ancient Greek ἡμι- (hēmi-), meaning 'half', φύλλον (phúllon), meaning 'leaf', and δάκτυλος (dáktulos), meaning 'finger') is a genus of geckos ranging from India and China southward to Southeast Asia and Oceania. Species of Hemiphyllodactylus are commonly known as half leaf-fingered geckos. Many species are known as dwarf geckos or slender geckos.

== Species ==
1. Hemiphyllodactylus arakuensis Agarwal, Khandekar, Giri, Ramakrishnan, & Karanth, 2019
2. Hemiphyllodactylus aurantiacus (Beddome, 1870) – Southern Ghats slender gecko
3. Hemiphyllodactylus banaensis Ngo Van Tri et al., 2014 – Ba Na dwarf gecko
4. Hemiphyllodactylus bintik Grismer et al., 2015 – spotted dwarf gecko
5. Hemiphyllodactylus bonkowskii Nguyen, Do, Ngo, Pham, Pham, Le, & Ziegler, 2020 – Bonkowski's slender gecko
6. Hemiphyllodactylus cattien Yushchenko, Grismer, Bragin, Dac & Poyarkov, 2023 the Cat Tien Slender Gecko
7. Hemiphyllodactylus changningensis Guo et al., 2015 – Changning slender gecko
8. Hemiphyllodactylus chiangmaiensis Grismer, Wood & Cota, 2014 – Chiang Mai dwarf gecko
9. Hemiphyllodactylus cicak Grismer et al., 2016 – Penang Island slender gecko
10. Hemiphyllodactylus dalatensis Do, Nguyen, Le, Pham, Ziegler, & Nguyen, 2021
11. Hemiphyllodactylus dupanglingensis Zhang, Qian, & Yang, 2020 – Dupangling slender gecko
12. Hemiphyllodactylus dushanensis (Zhou & Liu, 1981) – Dushan slender gecko, Dushan gypsy gecko, or Dushan dwarf gecko
13. Hemiphyllodactylus engganoensis Grismer et al., 2014 – Pulau Enggano dwarf gecko
14. Hemiphyllodactylus flaviventris Sukprasert, Sutthiwises, Lauhachinda, & Taksintum, 2018 – yellow-bellied dwarf gecko
15. Hemiphyllodactylus ganoklonis Zug, 2010 – Palauan slender gecko
16. Hemiphyllodactylus goaensis Khandekar, Parmar, N Sawant, & Agarwal, 2021 – Goan slender gecko
17. Hemiphyllodactylus harterti (F. Werner, 1900) – Bintang slender gecko, Hartert's slender gecko
18. Hemiphyllodactylus hongkongensis Sung, Lee, Ng, Zhang, & Yang, 2018 – Hong Kong slender gecko
19. Hemiphyllodactylus huishuiensis Yan, Lin, Guo, Li, & Zhou, 2016
20. Hemiphyllodactylus indosobrinus Eliades, Phimmachak, Sivongxay, Siler, & Stuart, 2019
21. Hemiphyllodactylus insularis Taylor, 1918 – Philippine slender gecko
22. Hemiphyllodactylus jinpingensis (Zhou & Liu, 1981) – Jinping slender gecko, Jinping gypsy gecko, or Jinping dwarf gecko
23. Hemiphyllodactylus jnana Agarwal, Khandekar, Giri, Ramakrishnan, & Karanth, 2019
24. Hemiphyllodactylus khlonglanensis Sukprasert, Sutthiwises, Lauhachinda, & Taksintum, 2018 – Khlong Lan dwarf gecko
25. Hemiphyllodactylus kiziriani Nguyen et al., 2014 – Kizirian's slender gecko
26. Hemiphyllodactylus kolliensis Agarwal, Khandekar, Giri, Ramakrishnan, & Karanth, 2019
27. Hemiphyllodactylus kyaiktiyoensis Grismer, Wood, Quah, Thura, Oaks, & Lin, 2020 – Kyaiktiyo Mountain slender gecko
28. Hemiphyllodactylus larutensis (Boulenger, 1900) – Larut dwarf gecko
29. Hemiphyllodactylus linnwayensis Grismer et al., 2017 – Lynn-Way dwarf gecko
30. Hemiphyllodactylus longlingensis (Zhou & Liu, 1981) – Longling slender gecko, Longling gypsy gecko, or Longling dwarf gecko
31. Hemiphyllodactylus margarethae Brongersma, 1931 – Sumatran slender gecko
32. Hemiphyllodactylus minimus Mohapatra, Khandekar, Dutta, Mahapatra & Agarwal, 2020 – Ganjam slender gecko
33. Hemiphyllodactylus montawaensis Grismer et al., 2017 – Montawa dwarf gecko
34. Hemiphyllodactylus nahangensis Do, Pham, Phan, Le, Ziegler, & Nguyen, 2020 – Nahang slender gecko
35. Hemiphyllodactylus ngwelwini Grismer, Wood, Quah, Thura, Oaks, & Lin, 2020 – Ngwe Lwin's slender gecko
36. Hemiphyllodactylus ngocsonensis Nguyen, Do, Ngo, Pham, Pham, Le, & Ziegler, 2020 – Ngocson slender gecko
37. Hemiphyllodactylus nilgiriensis Agarwal, Bauer, Pal, Srikanthan, & Khandekar, 2020 – Nilgiris slender gecko
38. Hemiphyllodactylus pardalis Grismer, Yushchenko, Pawangkhanant, Naiduangchan, Nazarov, Orlova, Suwannapoom, & Poyarkov, 2020 – spotted slender gecko
39. Hemiphyllodactylus peninsularis Agarwal, Bauer, Pal, Srikanthan, & Khandekar, 2020 – KMTR slender gecko
40. Hemiphyllodactylus pinlaungensis Grismer, Wood, Quah, Thura, Oaks, & Lin, 2020 – Pinlaung slender gecko
41. Hemiphyllodactylus serpispecus Eliades, Phimmachak, Sivongxay, Siler, & Stuart, 2019
42. Hemiphyllodactylus simaoensis Agung, Chornelia, Grismer, Grismer, Quah, Lu, Tomlinson, & Hughes, 2022
43. Hemiphyllodactylus tehtarik Grismer et al., 2013 – Tebu Mountain slender-toed gecko
44. Hemiphyllodactylus titiwangsaensis Zug, 2010 – Titiwangsa slender gecko
45. Hemiphyllodactylus tonywhitteni Grismer et al., 2017 – Phapant dwarf gecko
46. Hemiphyllodactylus typus Bleeker, 1860 – Indopacific tree gecko, Indopacific slender gecko, or common dwarf gecko
  1. Hemiphyllodactylus typus chapaensis Bourret, 1937
  2. Hemiphyllodactylus typus pallidus Auffenberg, 1980
  3. Hemiphyllodactylus typus typus Bleeker, 1860
47. Hemiphyllodactylus uga Grismer, Wood, Thura, Zin, Quah, Murdoch, Grismer, Li, Kyaw, & Lwin, 2018 – Uga's slender gecko
48. Hemiphyllodactylus yanshanensis Agung, Chornelia, Grismer, Grismer, Quah, Lu, Tomlinson, & Hughes, 2022
49. Hemiphyllodactylus yunnanensis (Boulenger, 1903) – Asian slender gecko, Yunnan gypsy gecko, or Yunnan dwarf gecko
50. Hemiphyllodactylus ywanganensis Grismer, Wood, Thura, Zin, Quah, Murdoch, Grismer, Li, Kyaw, & Lwin, 2018 – Ywangan slender gecko
51. Hemiphyllodactylus zalonicus Grismer, Chit, Pawangkhanant, Nazarov, Zaw, & Poyarkov, 2021 – Mt. Zalon slender gecko
52. Hemiphyllodactylus zayuensis Jiang, Wang, & Che, 2020
53. Hemiphyllodactylus zugi Nguyen et al., 2013 – Zug's slender gecko
54. Hemiphyllodactylus zhutangxiangensis Agung, Grismer, Grismer, Quah, Chornelia, Lu, & Hughes, 2021
55. Hemiphyllodactylus zwegabinensis Grismer, Wood, Quah, Thura, Oaks, & Lin, 2020 – Zwegabin Mountain slender gecko

Nota bene: In the above list, a binomial authority in parentheses indicates that the species was originally described in a genus other than Hemiphyllodactylus.
