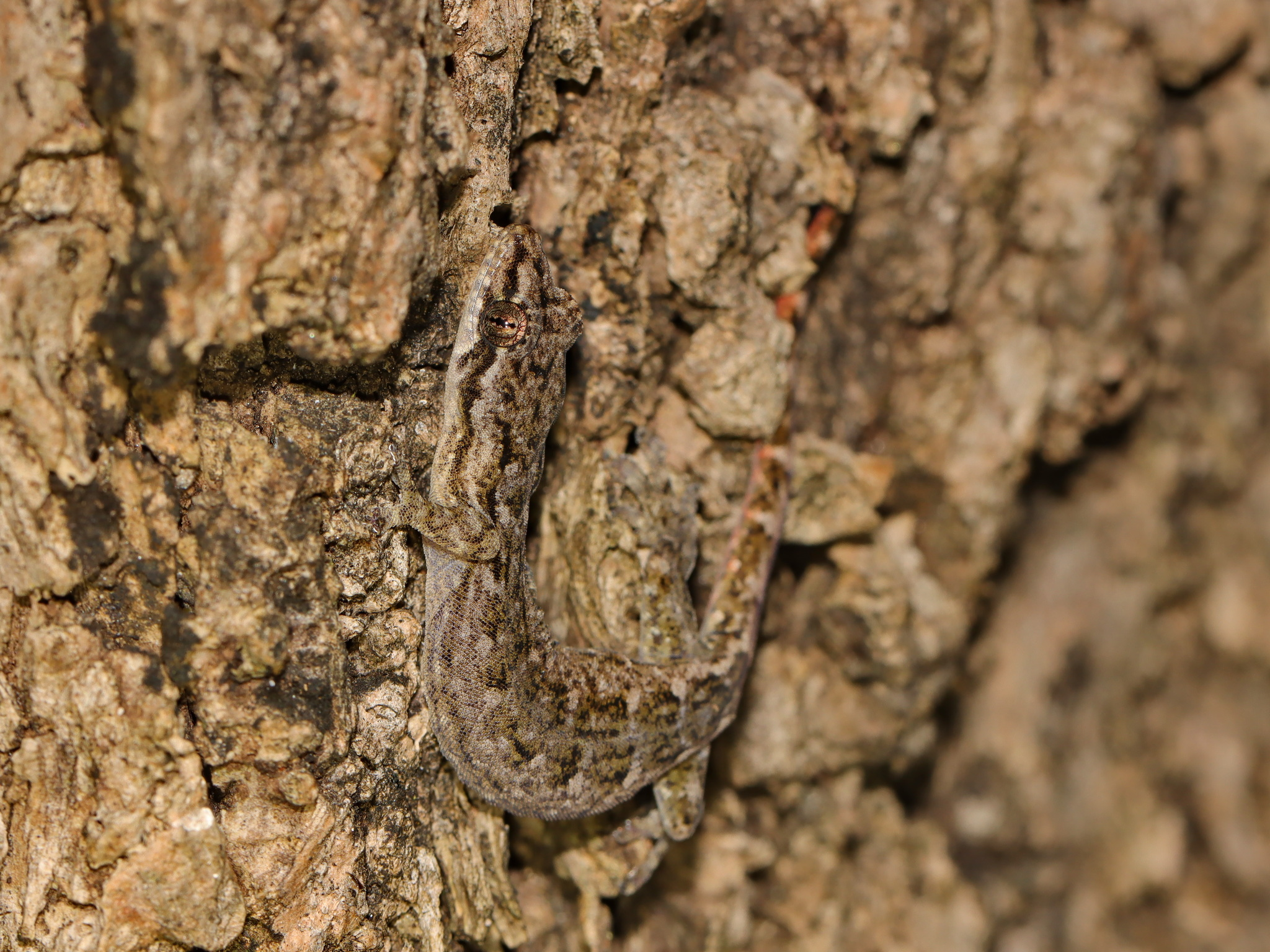

Scientific classification
- Kingdom: Animalia
- Phylum: Chordata
- Class: Reptilia
- Order: Squamata
- Suborder: Gekkota
- Family: Gekkonidae
- Genus: Hemiphyllodactylus
- Species: H. khlonglanensis

Binomial name
- Hemiphyllodactylus khlonglanensis Sukprasert, Sutthiwises, Lauhachinda, & Taksintum, 2018

= Khlong Lan dwarf gecko =

Species of lizard

The Khlong Lan dwarf gecko (Hemiphyllodactylus khlonglanensis) is a species of gecko. It is endemic to western Thailand.
