= Hemiphyllodactylus jinpingensis =

Scientific classification
- Kingdom: Animalia
- Phylum: Chordata
- Class: Reptilia
- Order: Squamata
- Suborder: Gekkota
- Family: Gekkonidae
- Genus: Hemiphyllodactylus
- Species: H. jinpingensis

Binomial name
- Hemiphyllodactylus jinpingensis (Zhou & Liu, 1981)

Synonyms
- Hemiphyllodactylus yunnanensis jinpingensis

Species of lizard

Hemiphyllodactylus jinpingensis, also known as the Jinping slender gecko, Jinping gypsy gecko, or Jinping dwarf gecko, is a species of gecko. It is found in China (Yunnan). It is named after its type locality, Jinping.
