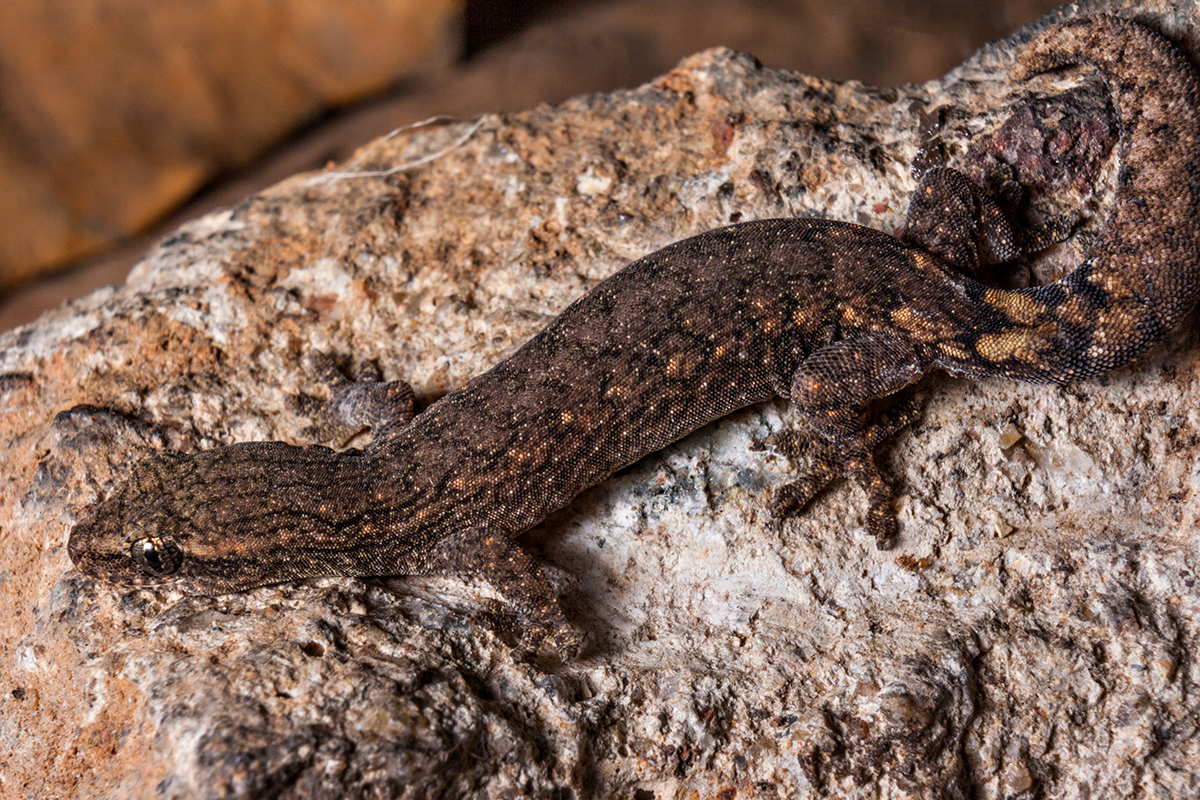

Scientific classification
- Kingdom: Animalia
- Phylum: Chordata
- Class: Reptilia
- Order: Squamata
- Suborder: Gekkota
- Family: Gekkonidae
- Genus: Hemiphyllodactylus
- Species: H. jnana

Binomial name
- Hemiphyllodactylus jnana Khandekar, Giri, Ramakrishnan, & Karanth, 2019

= Hemiphyllodactylus jnana =

Species of lizard

Hemiphyllodactylus jnana is a species of gecko. It is endemic to Tamil Nadu, India.
