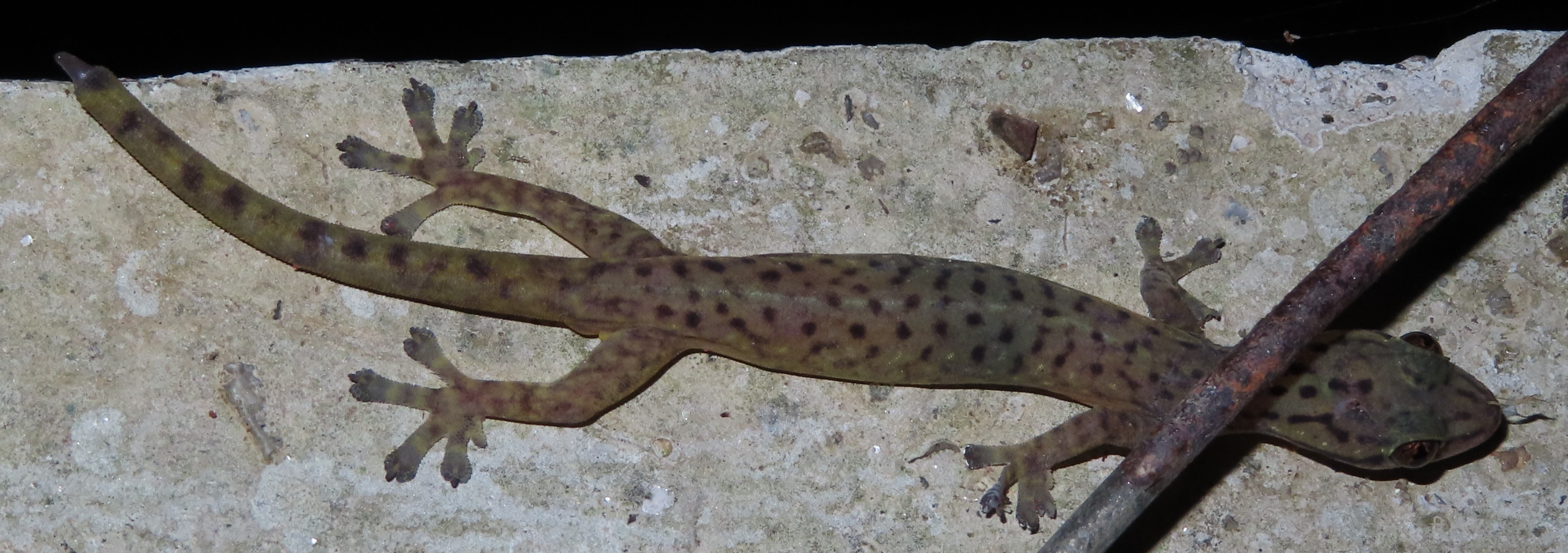

Scientific classification
- Kingdom: Animalia
- Phylum: Chordata
- Class: Reptilia
- Order: Squamata
- Suborder: Gekkota
- Family: Gekkonidae
- Genus: Hemiphyllodactylus
- Species: H. pardalis

Binomial name
- Hemiphyllodactylus pardalis Grismer, Yushchenko, Pawangkhanant, Naiduangchan, Nazarov, Orlova, Suwannapoom, & Poyarkov, 2020

= Hemiphyllodactylus pardalis =

Species of lizard

The spotted slender gecko (Hemiphyllodactylus pardalis) is a species of gecko. It is endemic to Thailand.
