= Hemiphyllodactylus yunnanensis =

Scientific classification
- Kingdom: Animalia
- Phylum: Chordata
- Class: Reptilia
- Order: Squamata
- Suborder: Gekkota
- Family: Gekkonidae
- Genus: Hemiphyllodactylus
- Species: H. yunnanensis

Binomial name
- Hemiphyllodactylus yunnanensis (Boulenger, 1903)

Synonyms
- Gehyra yunnanensis; Cainodactylus yunnanensis; Hemiphyllodactylus typus chapaensis; Hemiphyllodactylus chapaensis

Species of lizard

Hemiphyllodactylus yunnanensis, also known as the Asian slender gecko, Yunnan gypsy gecko, or Yunnan dwarf gecko, is a species of gecko. It is found in southern and southwestern China (Guizhou, Yunnan, Tibet), northern Myanmar, Laos, Vietnam, Cambodia, and Thailand.
