= Lynn-Way dwarf gecko =

Scientific classification
- Kingdom: Animalia
- Phylum: Chordata
- Class: Reptilia
- Order: Squamata
- Suborder: Gekkota
- Family: Gekkonidae
- Genus: Hemiphyllodactylus
- Species: H. linnwayensis

Binomial name
- Hemiphyllodactylus linnwayensis Grismer, Wood, Thura, Zin, Quah, Murdoch, Grismer, Li, Kyaw, & Lwin, 2017

Species of lizard

The Lynn-Way dwarf gecko (Hemiphyllodactylus linnwayensis) is a species of gecko. It is endemic to Myanmar.
