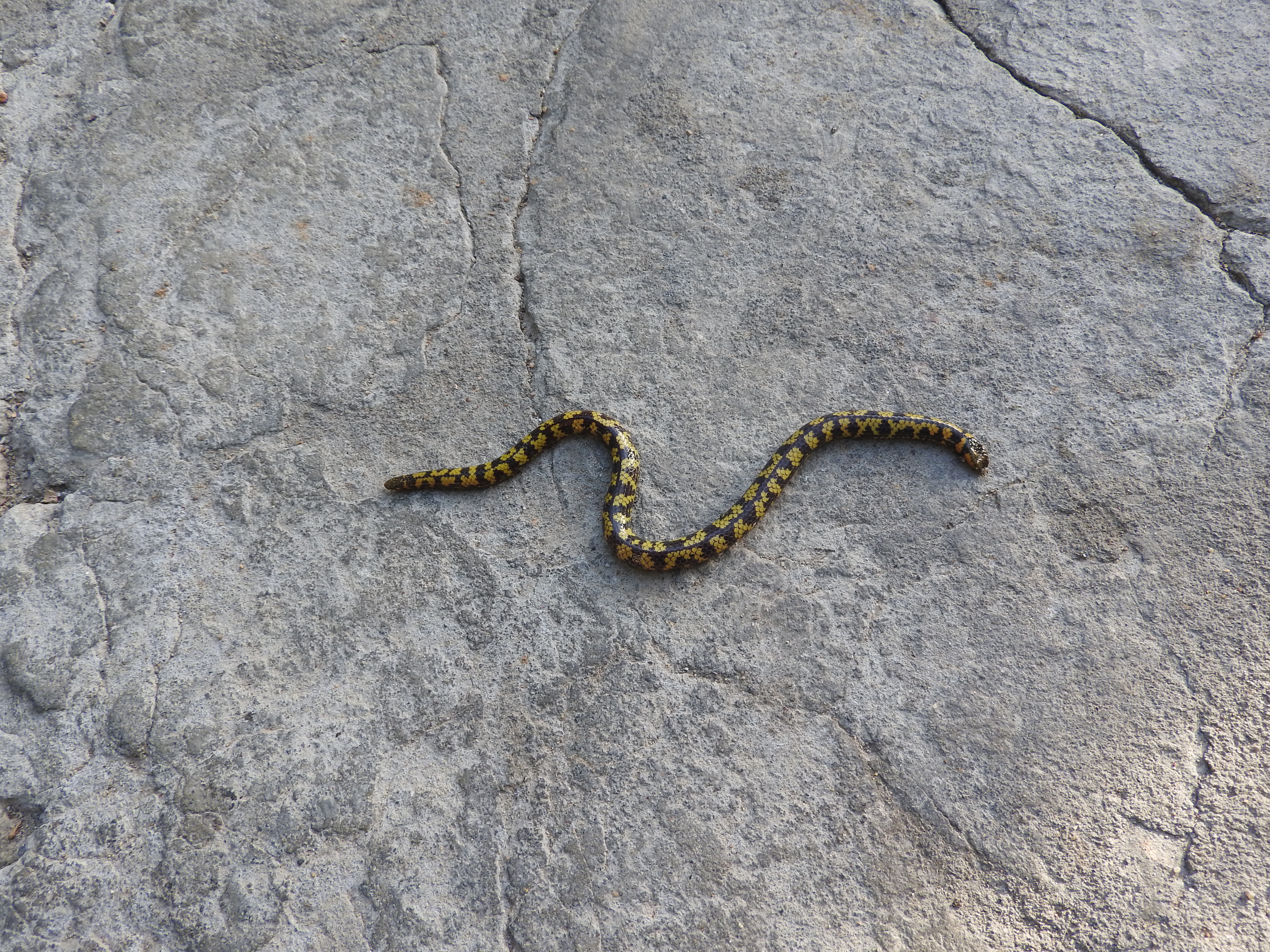

Conservation status
- Critically Endangered (IUCN 3.1)

Scientific classification
- Kingdom: Animalia
- Phylum: Chordata
- Class: Reptilia
- Order: Squamata
- Suborder: Serpentes
- Family: Uropeltidae
- Genus: Uropeltis
- Species: U. shorttii

Binomial name
- Uropeltis shorttii (Beddome, 1863)

Synonyms
- Silybura shortii Beddome, 1863: 225; Silybura shorttii — Beddome, 1863: 46 (redescription); Silybura shortii — Beddome, 1864: 177; Silybura nilgherriensis Var. Shortii — Beddome, 1886: 15; Silybura brevis — Boulenger, 1893: 158 (part); Uropeltis ceylanicus — M. A. Smith, 1943: 80 (part); Uropeltis ceylanicus shorrti — Murthy, 1990: 15 (in error); Uropeltis shorttii — Ganesh, Aengals & Ramanujam, 2014

= Uropeltis shorttii =

Species of snake

Uropeltis shorttii, also known commonly as the Shevaroy Hills earth snake and Shortt's shieldtail snake, is a species of non-venomous snake in the family Uropeltidae. The species is endemic to the southern Eastern Ghats of India. This species was first described as Silybura shorttii by British naturalist Richard Henry Beddome in 1863. It is found only in the Shevaroy Hills of Salem district in Tamil Nadu state in South India. For a long time, this species was misclassified into Uropeltis ceylanica, a snake endemic to the Western Ghats, till a recent taxonomic study proved it to be a distinct species with a very narrow geographic range. It is a burrowing snake, presumed to be nocturnal, feeding on soft-bodied worms. It becomes active during the rains. U. shorttii has most recently been assessed for The IUCN Red List of Threatened Species in 2019, and is listed as "Critically Endangered" under criteria B1ab(iii).

== Habitat ==
The preferred natural habitat of U. shorttii is forest, at altitudes of 1,300–1,600 m (4,300–5,200 ft), and it can not persist in human-modified habitats.

== Description ==
U. shorttii is a small, dark bluish black burrowing snake, with distinct yellow crossbands. It may attain a total length (including tail) of 30 cm (12 in). The rostral is visible from above, smaller than the nasals, not completely separating the nasals. The nasals are in contact with one another posteriorly. The prefrontals are not in contact with rostral, subequal in size to the nasal and ocular scales. The nasals are pierced by the nostrils, divided by the rostral anteriorly but in contact with each other posteriorly. The prefrontals are somewhat larger than the nasals and oculars, subequal to the frontal. The frontal is longer than broad, distinctly smaller than the parietals. The parietals are large, the largest of all the head scales. The supralabials number 4,4 (left, right), 1st and 2nd ones small, 3rd below eye, 4th the largest. The infralabials number 3,3 (left, right), and are elongate. The mental scale is small, subequal to the 1st infralabial, but as wide as long. The body scales are imbricate and cycloid. The dorsal scales are arranged in 19 rows one head length after the head, in 17 rows at midbody, and in 17–15 rows one head length before the vent. The ventrals number 141–156 (148.5±10.6), and are angulate laterally. The anals number 2, the left overlapping the right, each larger than a body scale. The subcaudals are in 10–12 pairs + 1 terminal scale. The tail shield is distinctly truncate above, mildly concave, circumscribed and ridged, covered with 30–31 (30.5±0.7), bi-carinate and tri-carinate thickened scales. There are 10 of these scales across the length and 4–5 (4.5±0.6) across the width of the tail shield.

== Colouration ==
The dorsum of U. shorttii is dark coffee brown with distinct bright yellow crossbars formed by series of yellow blotches across consecutive scales in dorsal scale rows. There are 34–47 (41±7.0) such cross bars present on the body and tail. The venter is largely yellowish with dark brown spots and blotches, the dark spots restricted mostly to either side where ventral scales contact the outermost coastal scale rows. On each side of the body there is a thick yellow stripe anteriorly along the neck and forebody on scale rows 3–5, the stripe extending to the level of the 36th–48th (42±8.4) ventral scale. The stripe passes through the lower half of the supralabials, below the ocular scale and the upper half of the infralabials. The eye is pale whitish-grey. The inside of the mouth is pale pink. The tongue is of same colour, its tips lighter.

== Behaviour ==
U. shorttii is terrestrial and fossorial.

== Etymology ==
U. shorttii is named after its collector Dr. John Shortt, a physician in the Madras Army, who donated the type specimens to Col. Richard Henry Beddome, who first described this species.
