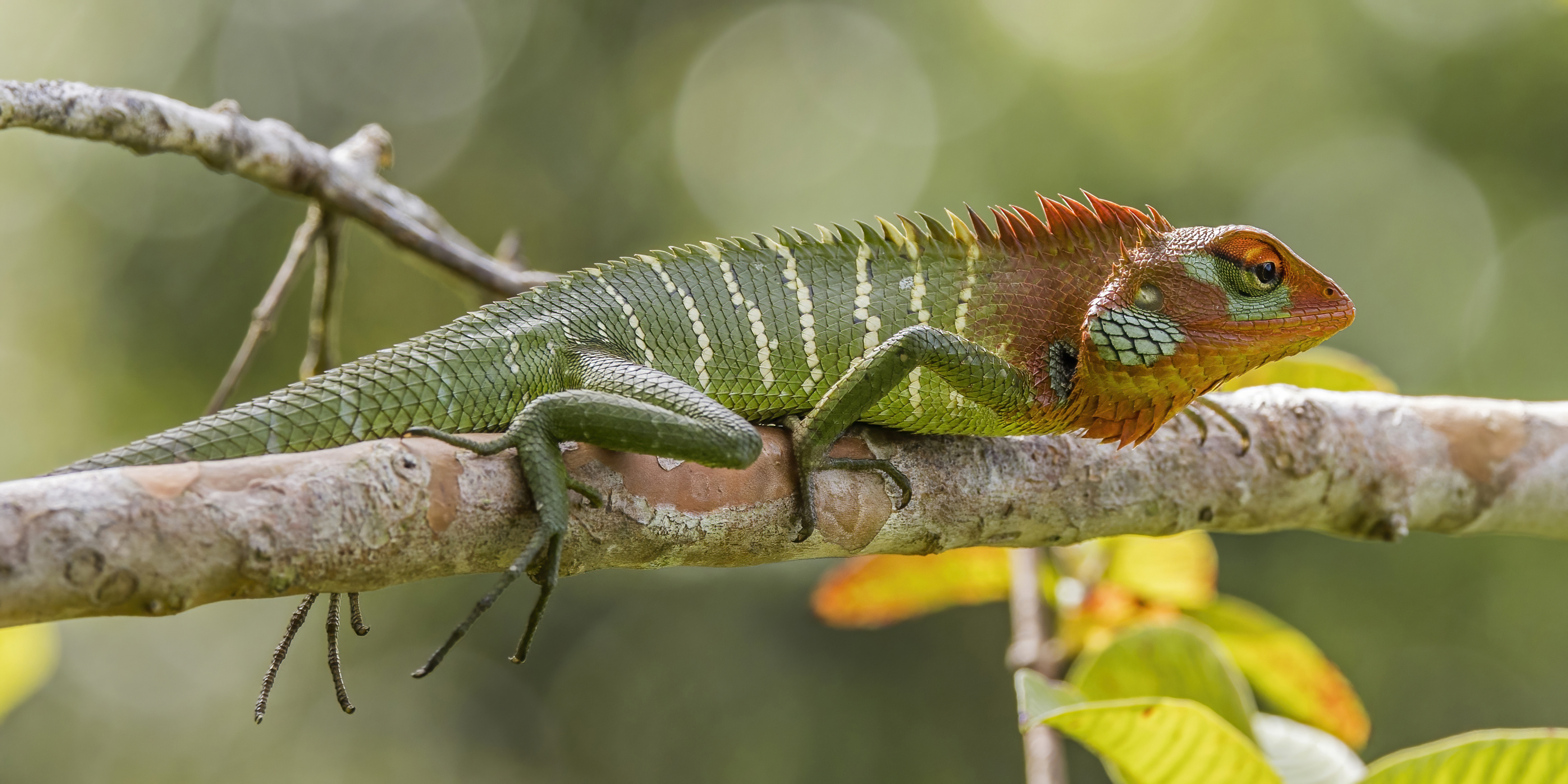
- Male in breeding colours
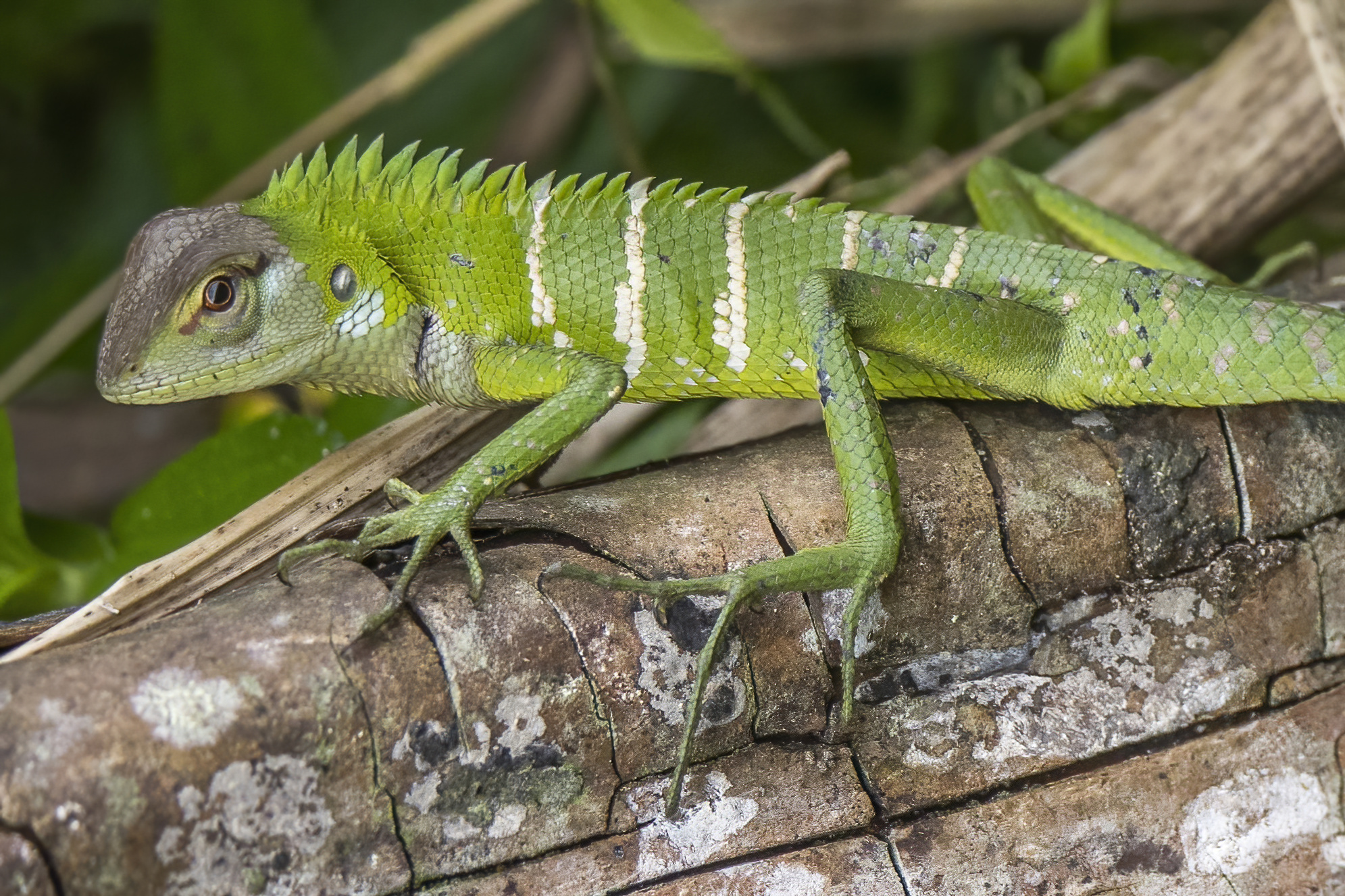
- Male in non-breeding colours both in Sinharaja Forest, Viharahena, Sri Lanka

Conservation status
- Least Concern (IUCN 3.1)

Scientific classification
- Kingdom: Animalia
- Phylum: Chordata
- Class: Reptilia
- Order: Squamata
- Suborder: Iguania
- Family: Agamidae
- Genus: Calotes
- Species: C. calotes

Binomial name
- Calotes calotes (Linnaeus, 1758)

Synonyms
- Lacerta Calotes Linnaeus, 1758; Iguana calotes Laurenti, 1768; Agama calotes Daudin, 1802; Calotes ophiomachus Duméril & Bibron, 1837

= Calotes calotes =

Common green forest lizard

Species of lizard

Calotes calotes, the common green forest lizard, is an agamid lizard found in the forests of the Western Ghats and the Shevaroy Hills in India, and Sri Lanka.

== Description ==
Calotes calotes is a considerably large species of agamid, measuring 50 to 65 cm (19.5 to 25.5 in) in length, including the tail.

The length of the head is one and a half times the size of its breadth, and the snout is a little longer than the orbit. The lizard has a concave forehead, swollen cheeks, and smooth, unequal upper head-scales. The canthus rostralis and the supraciliary edge are both sharp. A row of 8 or 9 compressed spines, divided into two groups, is above the tympanum; the diameter of these is less than half that of the orbit. C. calotes has 9 to 11 upper and as many lower labials. The body is compressed, the dorsal scales are large and usually feebly keeled, but sometimes smooth. These scales point backwards and upwards and are as large as or slightly smaller than the ventrals, which are strongly keeled and mucronate. 30 to 35 scales cover the middle of the body. The gular pouch is not developed, the gular scales are feebly keeled, and they are nearly as large as the ventrals. A short oblique fold is in front of the shoulder and is covered with small granular scales. The nuchal and dorsal crests are continuous, composed of closely set lanceolate spines with smaller ones at the base. In adult males, the height of the crest on the neck equals or exceeds the diameter of the orbit on the back; it gradually diminishes in size. The Limbs are moderate, the third and fourth fingers are nearly equal; however, the fourth toe is distinctly longer than the third toe. The hind limb reaches to the front of the eye or further. C. calotes has a very long and slender tail.

The lizard has a bright green dorsal coloration, usually with 5 or 6 white, cream, or dark green transverse stripes; however, these are changeable. Often, the stripes continue to the tail. The head is yellowish or brownish-green, whereas the male develops a bright red head and throat in the breeding season. The underside is a pale green, and the tail is light brown. Young and immature sometimes have a whitish dorso-lateral stripe. A half-grown example in the British Museum, no. 74.4.29.836, has a broad vertebral stripe of buff with elongated dark brown spots. It roosts on green foliage bearing trees like Azadirachta indica. Though very little knowledge is available in roosting ecology of the species.

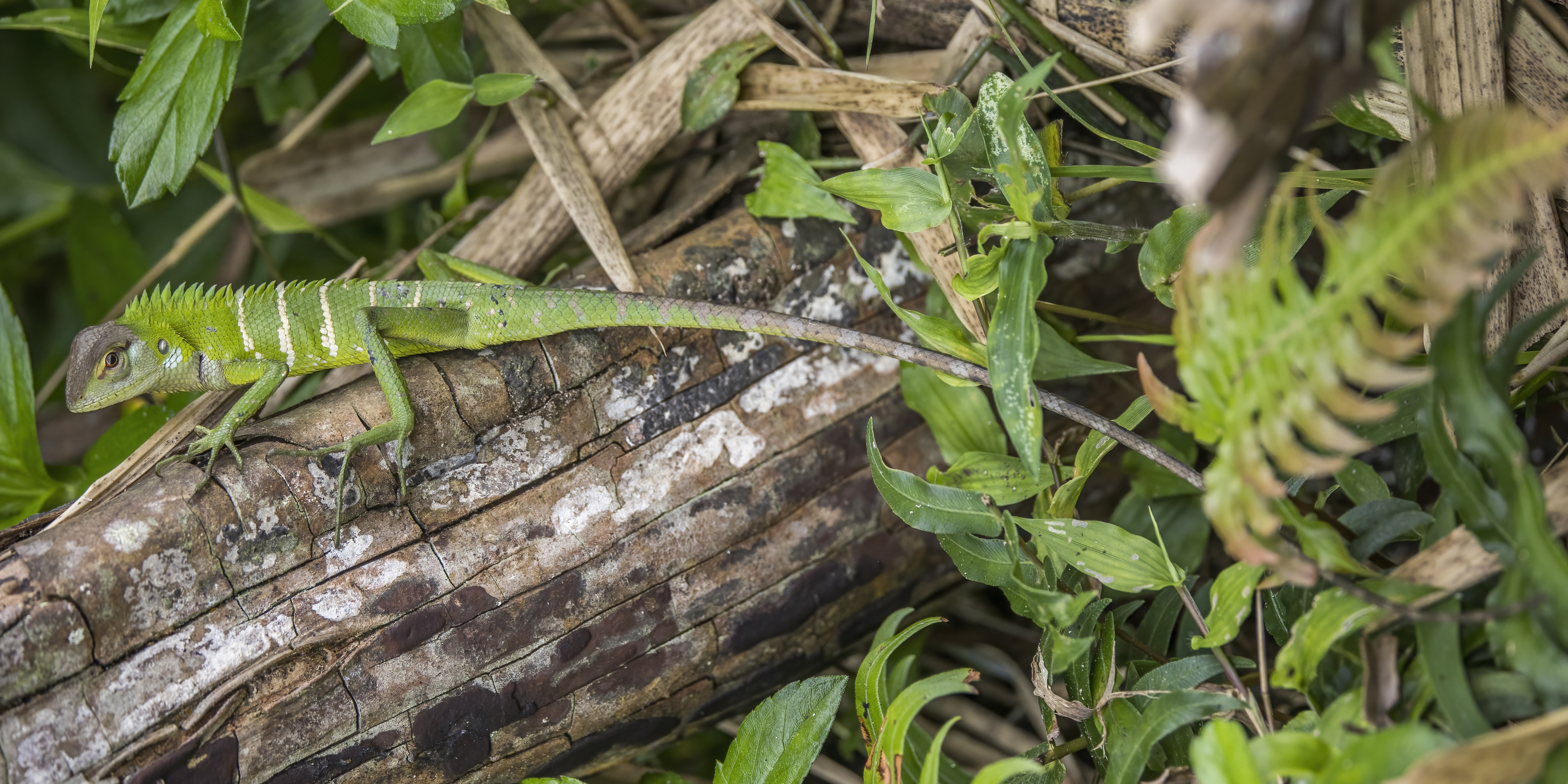
adult male, non-breeding
showing length of tail

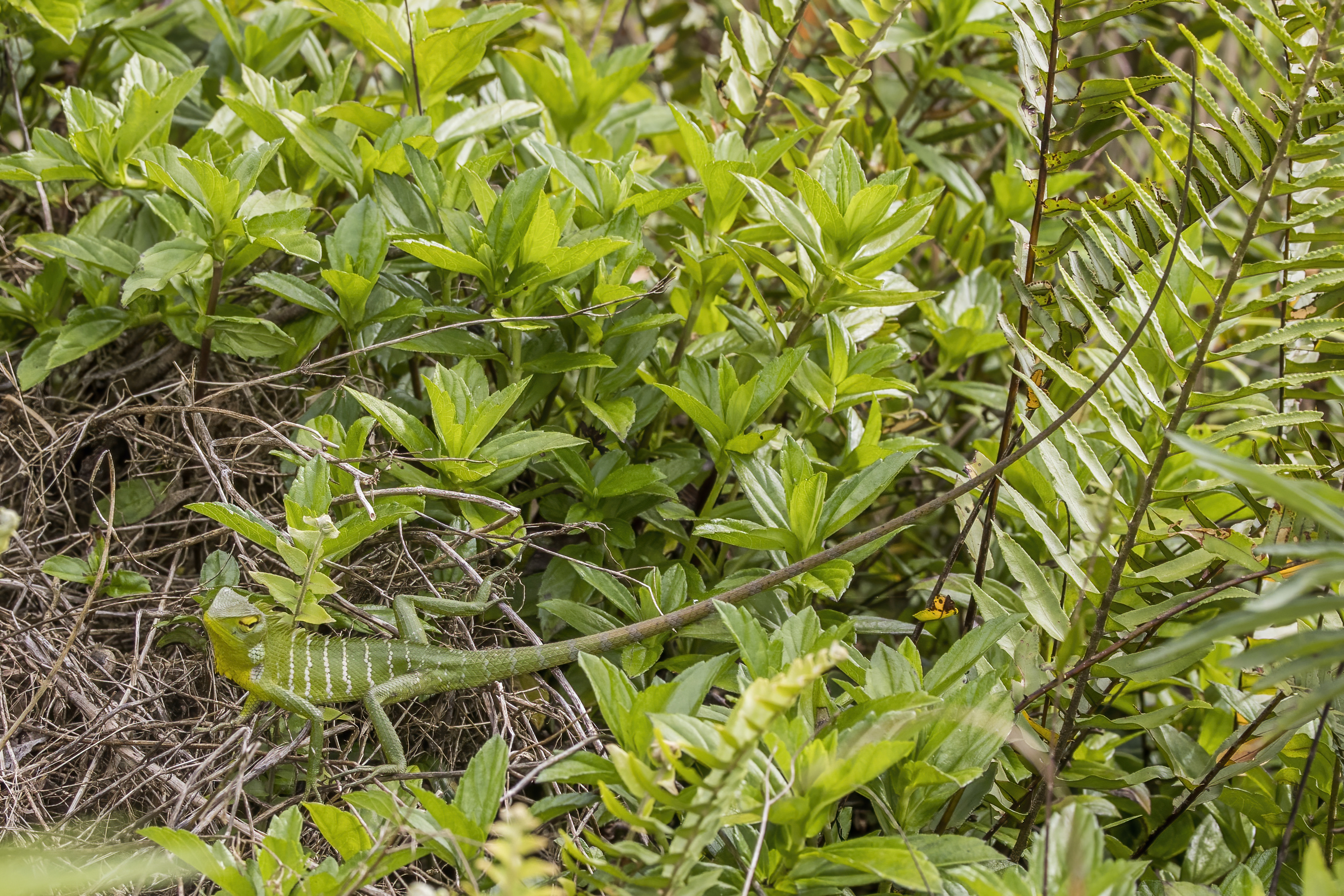
juvenile male, non-breeding
showing length of tail

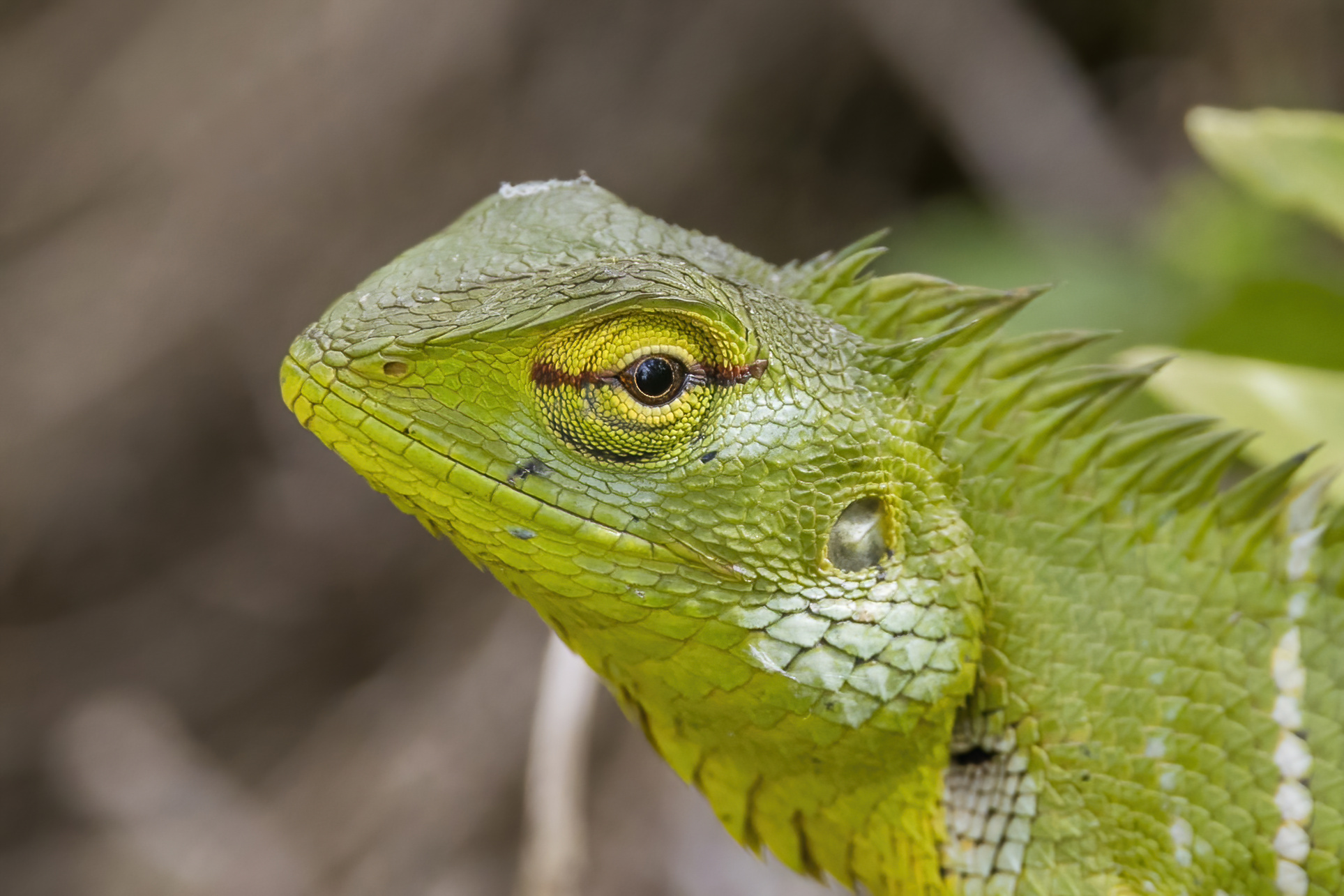
head of juvenile

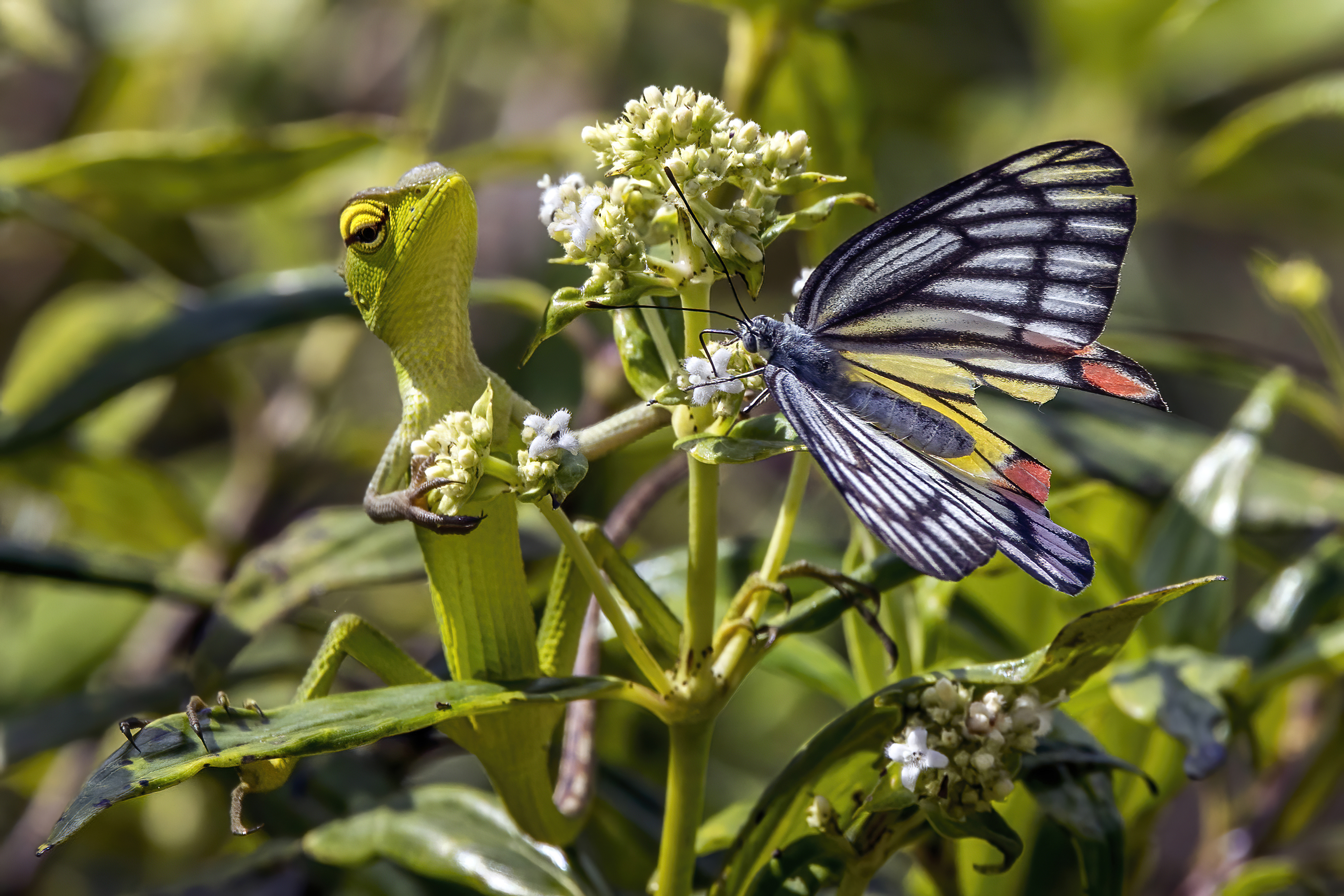
juvenile stalking butterfly
