= Hemiphyllodactylus yanshanensis =

Scientific classification
- Kingdom: Animalia
- Phylum: Chordata
- Class: Reptilia
- Order: Squamata
- Suborder: Gekkota
- Family: Gekkonidae
- Genus: Hemiphyllodactylus
- Species: H. yanshanensis

Binomial name
- Hemiphyllodactylus yanshanensis Agung, Chornelia, Grismer, Grismer, Quah, Lu, Tomlinson, & Hughes, 2022

Species of lizard

Hemiphyllodactylus yanshanensis is a species of gecko. It is endemic to China.
