= Changning slender gecko =

Scientific classification
- Kingdom: Animalia
- Phylum: Chordata
- Class: Reptilia
- Order: Squamata
- Suborder: Gekkota
- Family: Gekkonidae
- Genus: Hemiphyllodactylus
- Species: H. changningensis

Binomial name
- Hemiphyllodactylus changningensis Guo, Zhou, Yan, & Li, 2015

Species of lizard

The Changning slender gecko (Hemiphyllodactylus changningensis) is a species of gecko. It is endemic to Yunnan, Chin. In Changning County, western Yunnan, specimens were found of an unnamed species of Hemiphyllodactylus were described as "a slender body and unique U-shaped digital lamellae". This is the first known species of any known Hemiphyllodactylus from this population, thus being described as a new species.
