= Titiwangsa slender gecko =

Scientific classification
- Kingdom: Animalia
- Phylum: Chordata
- Class: Reptilia
- Order: Squamata
- Suborder: Gekkota
- Family: Gekkonidae
- Genus: Hemiphyllodactylus
- Species: H. titiwangsaensis

Binomial name
- Hemiphyllodactylus titiwangsaensis Zug, 2010

Species of lizard

The Titiwangsa slender gecko (Hemiphyllodactylus titiwangsaensis) is a species of gecko. It is endemic to Peninsular Malaysia.
