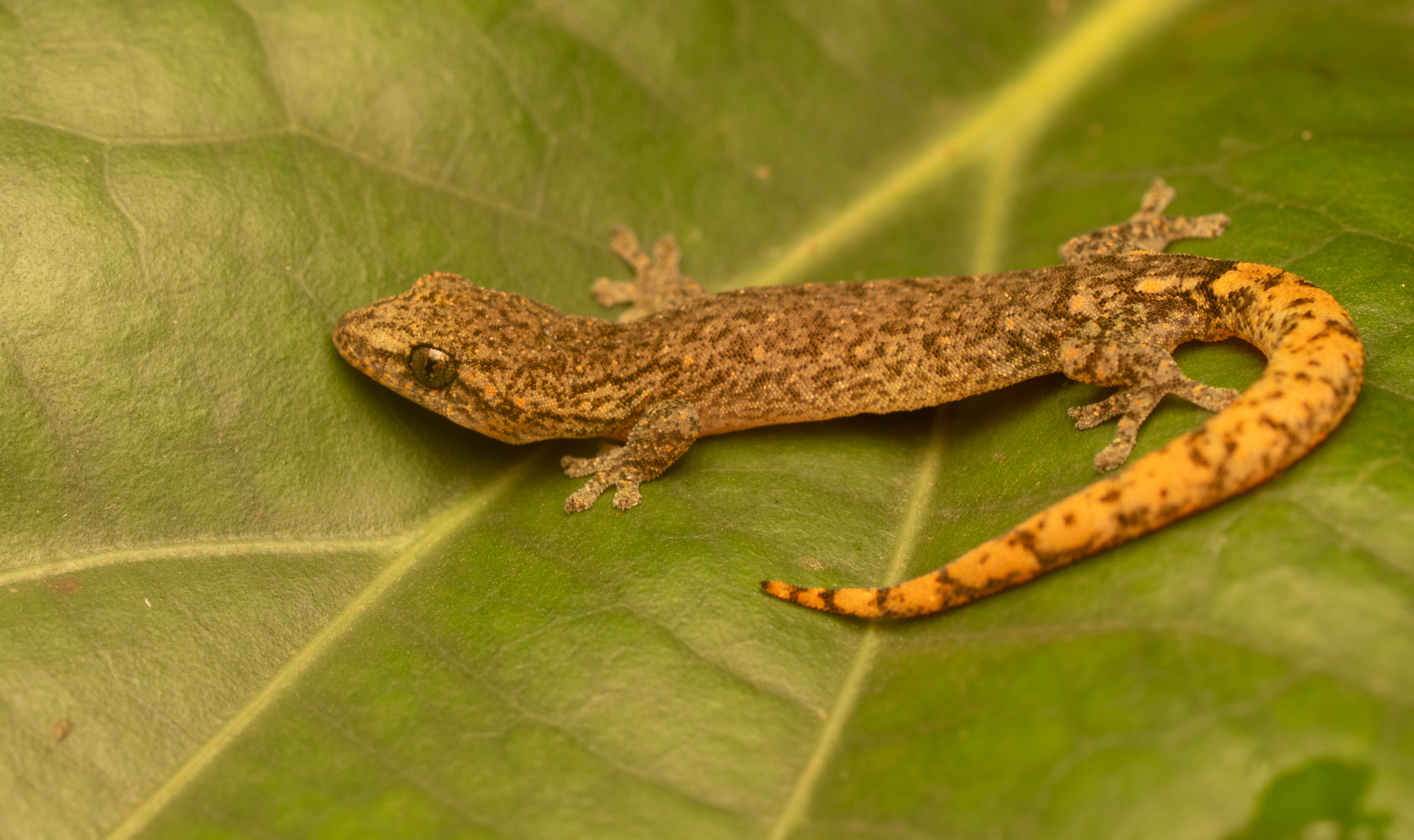

Scientific classification
- Kingdom: Animalia
- Phylum: Chordata
- Class: Reptilia
- Order: Squamata
- Suborder: Gekkota
- Family: Gekkonidae
- Genus: Hemiphyllodactylus
- Species: H. arakuensis

Binomial name
- Hemiphyllodactylus arakuensis Khandekar, Giri, Ramakrishnan, & Karanth, 2019

= Hemiphyllodactylus arakuensis =

Species of lizard

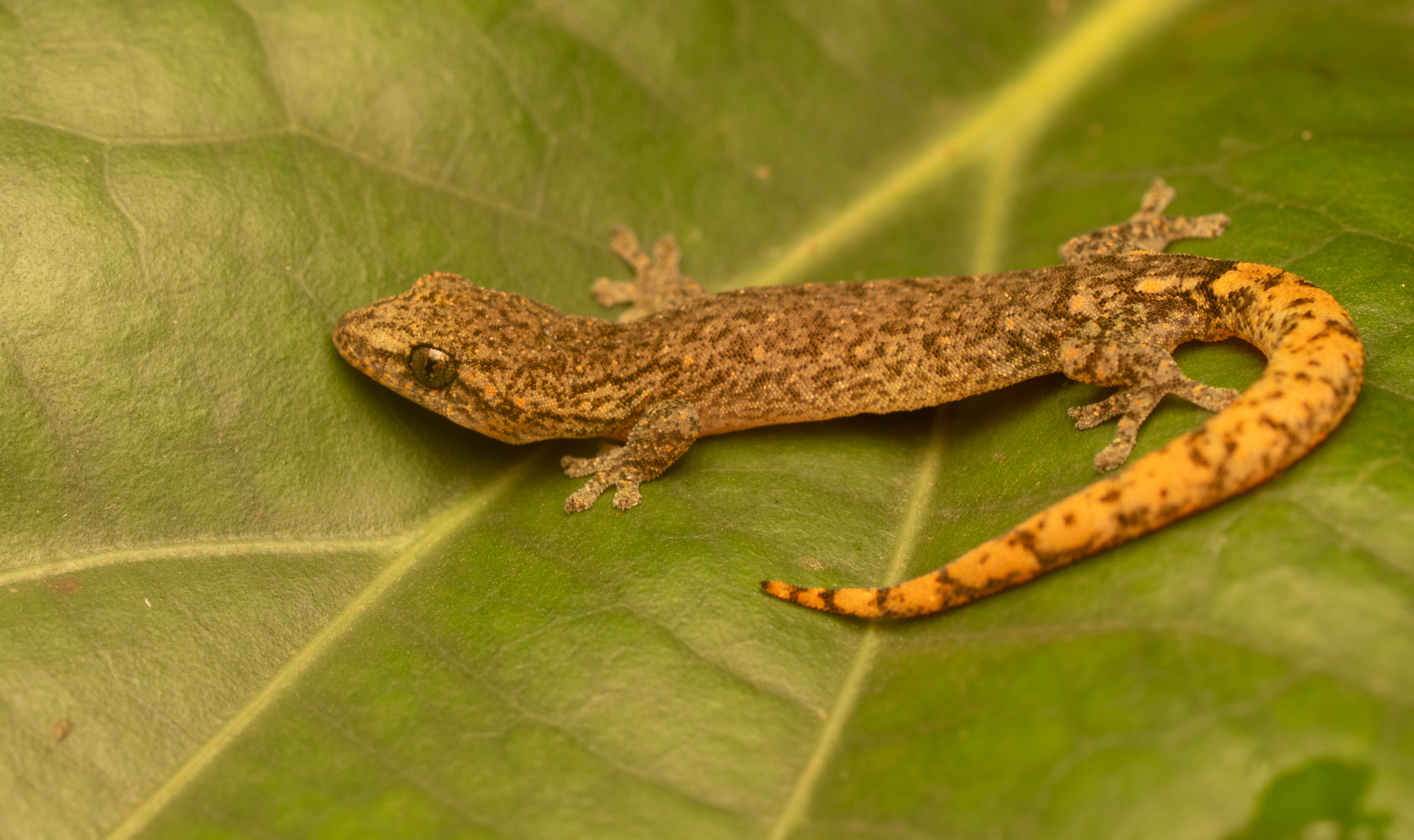

Hemiphyllodactylus arakuensis is a species of gecko. It is endemic to Andhra Pradesh, Telangana, India.
