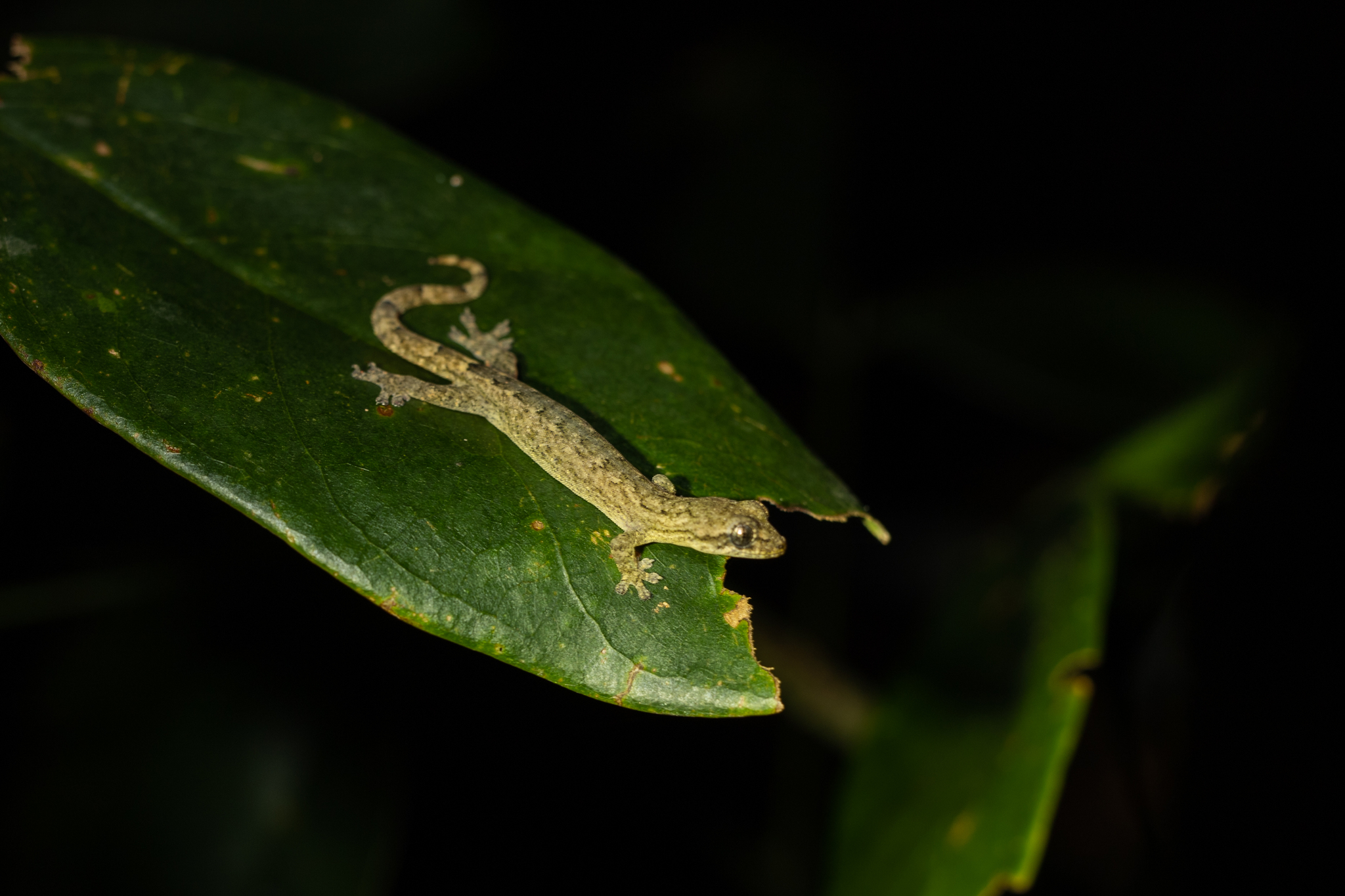

Scientific classification
- Kingdom: Animalia
- Phylum: Chordata
- Class: Reptilia
- Order: Squamata
- Suborder: Gekkota
- Family: Gekkonidae
- Genus: Hemiphyllodactylus
- Species: H. chiangmaiensis

Binomial name
- Hemiphyllodactylus chiangmaiensis Grismer, Wood & Cota, 2014

= Chiang Mai dwarf gecko =

Chiang Mai Dwarf Gecko

Species of reptile

The Chiang Mai dwarf gecko (Hemiphyllodactylus chiangmaiensis) is a species of gecko endemic to Chiang Mai Province of Thailand.
