= Hemiphyllodactylus minimus =

Scientific classification
- Kingdom: Animalia
- Phylum: Chordata
- Class: Reptilia
- Order: Squamata
- Suborder: Gekkota
- Family: Gekkonidae
- Genus: Hemiphyllodactylus
- Species: H. minimus

Binomial name
- Hemiphyllodactylus minimus Mohapatra, Khandekar, Dutta, Mahapatra, & Agarwal, 2020

Species of lizard

The Ganjam slender gecko (Hemiphyllodactylus minimus) is a species of gecko. It is endemic to India.
