= Hemiphyllodactylus kyaiktiyoensis =

Scientific classification
- Domain: Eukaryota
- Kingdom: Animalia
- Phylum: Chordata
- Class: Reptilia
- Order: Squamata
- Infraorder: Gekkota
- Family: Gekkonidae
- Genus: Hemiphyllodactylus
- Species: H. kyaiktiyoensis

Binomial name
- Hemiphyllodactylus kyaiktiyoensis Grismer, Wood, Quah, Thura, Oaks, & Lin, 2020

Species of lizard

The Kyaiktiyo Mountain slender gecko (Hemiphyllodactylus kyaiktiyoensis) is a species of gecko. It is endemic to Myanmar.
