= Tebu Mountain slender-toed gecko =

Scientific classification
- Kingdom: Animalia
- Phylum: Chordata
- Class: Reptilia
- Order: Squamata
- Suborder: Gekkota
- Family: Gekkonidae
- Genus: Hemiphyllodactylus
- Species: H. tehtarik

Binomial name
- Hemiphyllodactylus tehtarik Grismer, Wood Jr., Anuar, Muin, Quah, Mcguire, Brown, Van Tri, & Thai, 2013

Species of lizard

The Tebu Mountain slender-toed gecko (Hemiphyllodactylus tehtarik) is a species of gecko. It is endemic to Peninsular Malaysia.
