= Hemiphyllodactylus dushanensis =

Scientific classification
- Kingdom: Animalia
- Phylum: Chordata
- Class: Reptilia
- Order: Squamata
- Suborder: Gekkota
- Family: Gekkonidae
- Genus: Hemiphyllodactylus
- Species: H. dushanensis

Binomial name
- Hemiphyllodactylus dushanensis (Zhou & Liu, 1981)

Synonyms
- Hemiphyllodactylus yunnanensis dushanensis

Species of lizard

Hemiphyllodactylus dushanensis, also known as the Dushan slender gecko, Dushan gypsy gecko, or Dushan dwarf gecko, is a species of gecko. It is found in China (Guizhou). It is named after its type locality, Dushan.
