= Hemiphyllodactylus nahangensis =

Scientific classification
- Kingdom: Animalia
- Phylum: Chordata
- Class: Reptilia
- Order: Squamata
- Suborder: Gekkota
- Family: Gekkonidae
- Genus: Hemiphyllodactylus
- Species: H. nahangensis

Binomial name
- Hemiphyllodactylus nahangensis Do, Pham, Phan, Le, Ziegler, & Nguyen, 2020

Species of lizard

The Nahang slender gecko (Hemiphyllodactylus nahangensis) is a species of gecko. It is endemic to Vietnam.
