= Philippine slender gecko =

Conservation status
- Data Deficient (IUCN 3.1)

Scientific classification
- Kingdom: Animalia
- Phylum: Chordata
- Class: Reptilia
- Order: Squamata
- Suborder: Gekkota
- Family: Gekkonidae
- Genus: Hemiphyllodactylus
- Species: H. insularis

Binomial name
- Hemiphyllodactylus insularis Taylor, 1918
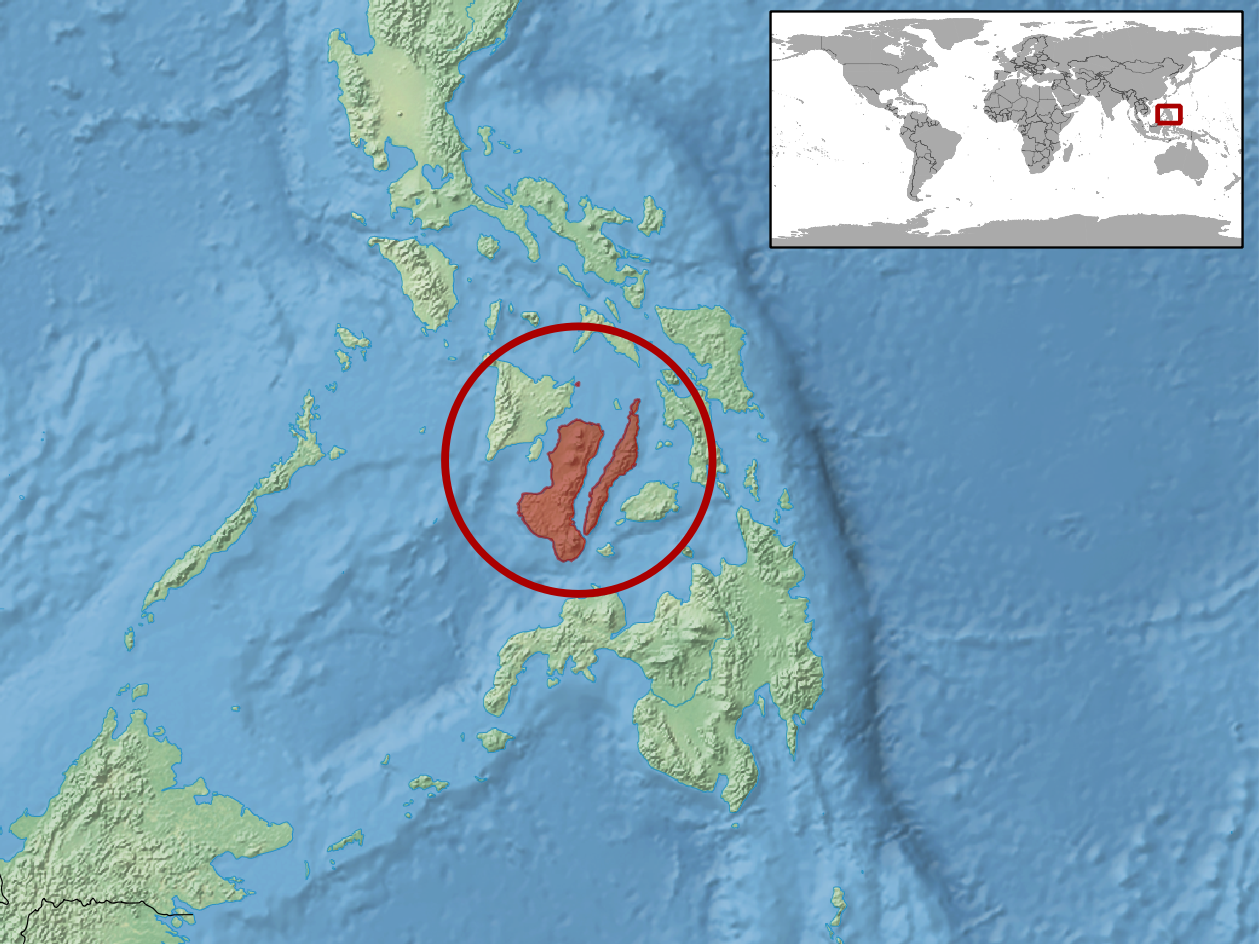

Species of lizard

The Philippine slender gecko (Hemiphyllodactylus insularis) is a species of gecko. It is endemic to the Philippines.
