= Hemiphyllodactylus nilgiriensis =

Scientific classification
- Kingdom: Animalia
- Phylum: Chordata
- Class: Reptilia
- Order: Squamata
- Suborder: Gekkota
- Family: Gekkonidae
- Genus: Hemiphyllodactylus
- Species: H. nilgiriensis

Binomial name
- Hemiphyllodactylus nilgiriensis Agarwal, Bauer, Pal, Srikanthan, & Khandekar, 2020

Species of lizard

The Nilgiris slender gecko (Hemiphyllodactylus nilgiriensis) is a species of gecko.

== Distribution ==
It is endemic to Tamil Nadu, India.
