= Hemiphyllodactylus ngwelwini =

Scientific classification
- Kingdom: Animalia
- Phylum: Chordata
- Class: Reptilia
- Order: Squamata
- Suborder: Gekkota
- Family: Gekkonidae
- Genus: Hemiphyllodactylus
- Species: H. ngwelwini

Binomial name
- Hemiphyllodactylus ngwelwini Grismer, Wood, Quah, Thura, Oaks, & Lin, 2020

Species of lizard

Ngwe Lwin's slender gecko (Hemiphyllodactylus ngwelwini) is a species of gecko. It is endemic to Myanmar.

== Etymology ==
The specific name, ngwelwini, is in honor of Ngwe Lwin, Northern Programme Manager of Fauna & Flora International, Myanmar Programme for his supportive and invaluably instrumental in facilitating herpetological field surveys in Myanmar.

== Geographic range ==
This species is known from three localities across a distance of approximately 29 km from Pwe Hla Village in the north to the Thayeumin and Myintmahati caves in the south, Shan State.
