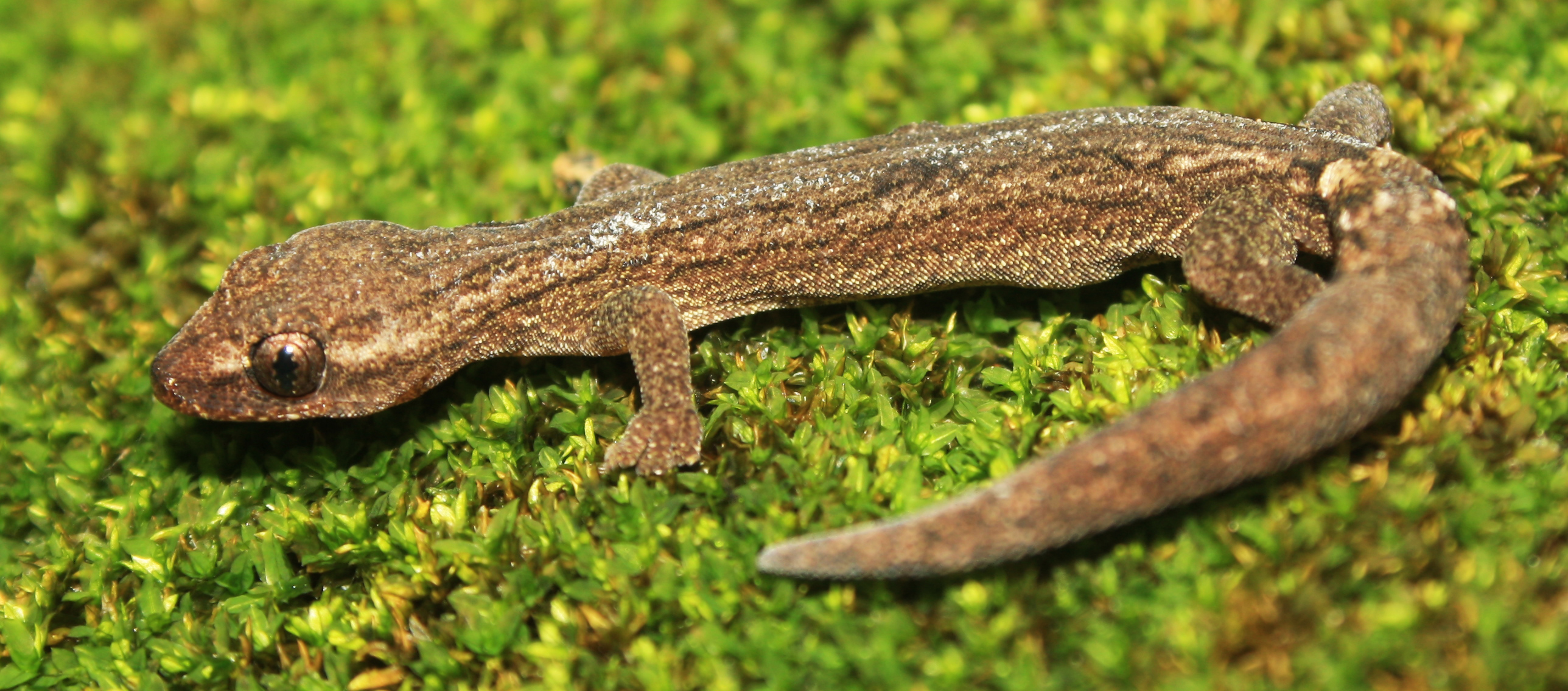

Scientific classification
- Kingdom: Animalia
- Phylum: Chordata
- Class: Reptilia
- Order: Squamata
- Suborder: Gekkota
- Family: Gekkonidae
- Genus: Hemiphyllodactylus
- Species: H. peninsularis

Binomial name
- Hemiphyllodactylus peninsularis Agarwal, Bauer, Pal, Srikanthan, & Khandekar, 2020

= Hemiphyllodactylus peninsularis =

Species of lizard

The KMTR slender gecko (Hemiphyllodactylus peninsularis) is a species of gecko. It is endemic to the Kalakkad Mundanthurai Tiger Reserve, India.
