= Hemiphyllodactylus dupanglingensis =

Scientific classification
- Kingdom: Animalia
- Phylum: Chordata
- Class: Reptilia
- Order: Squamata
- Suborder: Gekkota
- Family: Gekkonidae
- Genus: Hemiphyllodactylus
- Species: H. dupanglingensis

Binomial name
- Hemiphyllodactylus dupanglingensis Zhang, Qian, & Yang, 2020

Species of lizard

The Dupangling slender gecko (Hemiphyllodactylus dupanglingensis) is a species of gecko. It is endemic to China.
