= Hemiphyllodactylus goaensis =

Scientific classification
- Kingdom: Animalia
- Phylum: Chordata
- Class: Reptilia
- Order: Squamata
- Suborder: Gekkota
- Family: Gekkonidae
- Genus: Hemiphyllodactylus
- Species: H. goaensis

Binomial name
- Hemiphyllodactylus goaensis Khandekar, Parmar, N Sawant, & Agarwal, 2021

Species of lizard

Hemiphyllodactylus goaensis, the Goan slender gecko, is a species of gecko. It is endemic to India.
