= Kizirian's slender gecko =

Conservation status
- Least Concern (IUCN 3.1)

Scientific classification
- Kingdom: Animalia
- Phylum: Chordata
- Class: Reptilia
- Order: Squamata
- Suborder: Gekkota
- Family: Gekkonidae
- Genus: Hemiphyllodactylus
- Species: H. kiziriani

Binomial name
- Hemiphyllodactylus kiziriani Nguyen, Botov, Le, Nophaseud, Zug, Bonkowski & Ziegler, 2014

Species of lizard

Kizirian's slender gecko (Hemiphyllodactylus kiziriani) is a species of gecko, a lizard in the family Gekkonidae. The species is endemic to Laos.

== Taxonomy ==
Kizirian's slender gecko was first formally described in 2014 by Truong Quang Nguyen, Andreas Botov, Minh Duc Le, Liphone Nophaseud, George Robert Zug, Michael Bonkowski and Thomas Ziegler with its type locality given as a limestone wall of a small cave at 19°48.708’N, 102°06.188’E, from 637 m (2,090 ft) above sea level, near Ban Xieng Muak Village, Luang Prabang District, Luang Prabang Province in Laos.

== Etymology ==
Kizirian's slender gecko has the specific name, kiziriani, this is in honor of American herpetologist David A. Kizirian.

== Geographic range ==
Kizirian's slender gecko is known only from the vicinity of the type locality in Luang Prabang Province, northern Laos.

== Habitat ==
Kizirian's slender gecko is found in secondary limestone forests which have been disturbed, they appear to be nocturanal and have been observed on tree bark and limestone cliffs near cave entrances, and on a limestone boulder close to a forest trail. This species is found at altitudes between 590 and 640 m (1,940 and 2,100 ft).

== Description ==
Kizirian's slender gecko average a snout-to-vent length of 37.5 mm (1.48 in) in males. The females are slightly larger, with an average snout-to vent length of 38.6 mm (1.52 in). The upper body is dark brown with two rows of irregular crosswise bands. There is a dark lateral stripe in the head and the upper flank also has a dark stripe.

== Reproduction ==
Kizirian's slender gecko is oviparous. Clutch size is two eggs.
