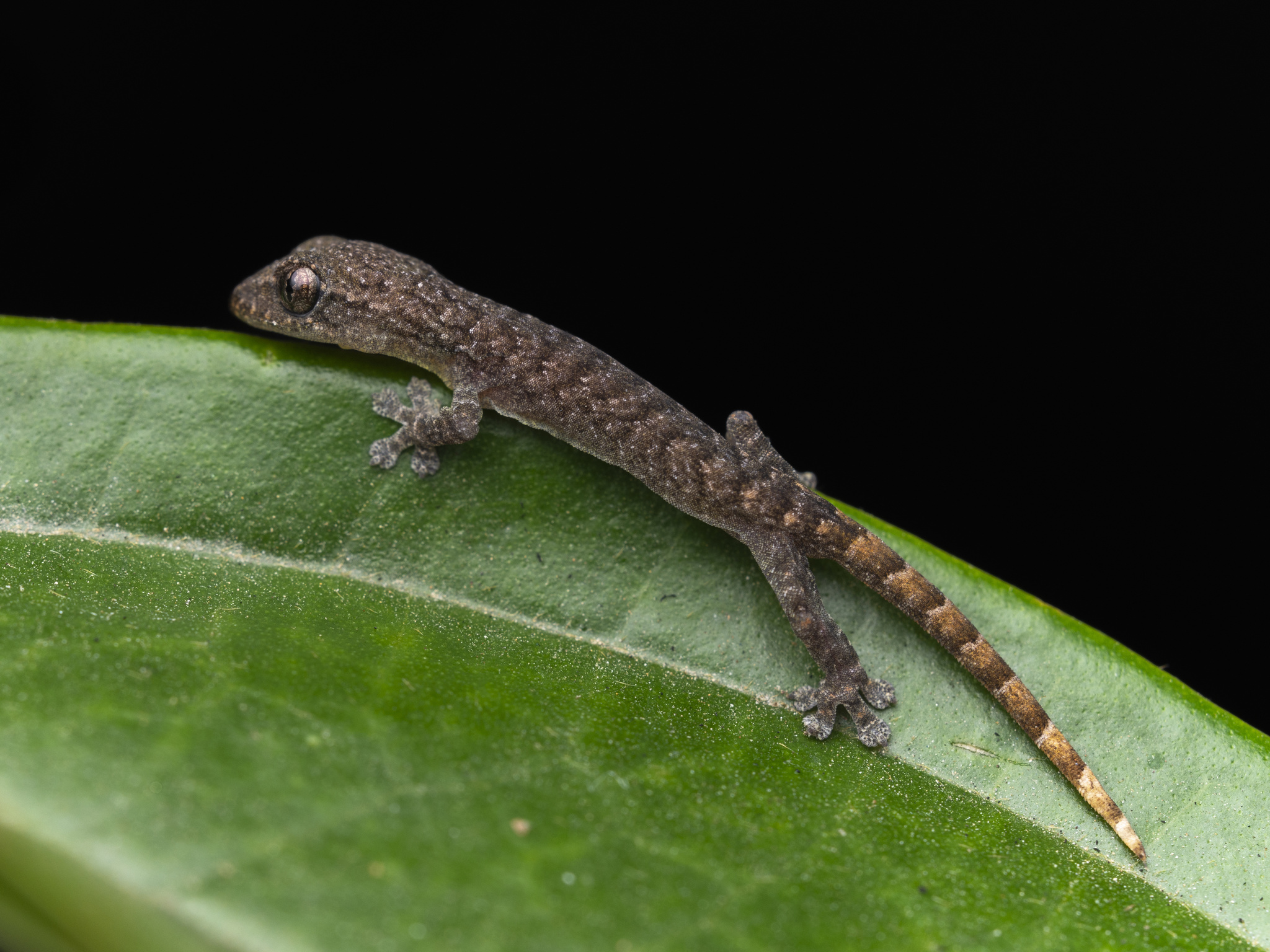

Conservation status
- Near Threatened (IUCN 3.1)

Scientific classification
- Kingdom: Animalia
- Phylum: Chordata
- Class: Reptilia
- Order: Squamata
- Suborder: Gekkota
- Family: Gekkonidae
- Genus: Hemiphyllodactylus
- Species: H. hongkongensis

Binomial name
- Hemiphyllodactylus hongkongensis Sung, Lee, Ng, Zhang, & Yang, 2018

= Hemiphyllodactylus hongkongensis =

Species of lizard

Hemiphyllodactylus hongkongensis, also known as the Hong Kong slender gecko, is a species of gecko. It is endemic to Hong Kong.
