= Penang Island slender gecko =

Scientific classification
- Kingdom: Animalia
- Phylum: Chordata
- Class: Reptilia
- Order: Squamata
- Suborder: Gekkota
- Family: Gekkonidae
- Genus: Hemiphyllodactylus
- Species: H. cicak

Binomial name
- Hemiphyllodactylus cicak Cobos, Grismer, Wood, Quah, Anuar, & Muin, 2016

Species of lizard

The Penang island slender gecko (Hemiphyllodactylus cicak) is a species of gecko. It is endemic to Penang Island in Malaysia.
