= Yellow-bellied dwarf gecko =

Scientific classification
- Domain: Eukaryota
- Kingdom: Animalia
- Phylum: Chordata
- Class: Reptilia
- Order: Squamata
- Infraorder: Gekkota
- Family: Gekkonidae
- Genus: Hemiphyllodactylus
- Species: H. flaviventris

Binomial name
- Hemiphyllodactylus flaviventris Sukprasert, Sutthiwises, Lauhachinda, & Taksintum, 2018

Species of lizard

The yellow-bellied dwarf gecko (Hemiphyllodactylus flaviventris) is a species of gecko. It is endemic to eastern Thailand.
