= Hemiphyllodactylus bintik =

Scientific classification
- Kingdom: Animalia
- Phylum: Chordata
- Class: Reptilia
- Order: Squamata
- Suborder: Gekkota
- Family: Gekkonidae
- Genus: Hemiphyllodactylus
- Species: H. bintik

Binomial name
- Hemiphyllodactylus bintik Grismer, Wood, Anuar, Quah, Muin, Onn, Sumarli & Loredo, 2015

Species of lizard

The spotted dwarf gecko (Hemiphyllodactylus bintik) is a species of gecko. It is endemic to Peninsular Malaysia.
