= Hemiphyllodactylus harterti =

Conservation status
- Near Threatened (IUCN 3.1)

Scientific classification
- Kingdom: Animalia
- Phylum: Chordata
- Class: Reptilia
- Order: Squamata
- Suborder: Gekkota
- Family: Gekkonidae
- Genus: Hemiphyllodactylus
- Species: H. harterti

Binomial name
- Hemiphyllodactylus harterti (F. Werner, 1900)

Synonyms
- Lepidodactylus harterti F. Werner, 1900; Hemiphyllodactylus harterti — Chan-ard et al., 1999

Species of lizard

Hemiphyllodactylus harterti, also known commonly as the Bintang slender gecko, Hartert's slender gecko, and Werner's gypsy gecko, is a species of lizard in the family Gekkonidae. The species is endemic to Peninsular Malaysia.

== Etymology ==
The specific name, harterti, is in honor of German ornithologist Ernst Johann Otto Hartert.

== Habitat ==
The preferred natural habitat of H. harterti is forest, at altitudes as high as 1,100 m (3,600 ft).

== Description ==
Adults of H. harteri have a snout-to-vent length (SVL) of about 4 cm (1.6 in), and a tail length slightly shorter than SVL. Males have 44–45 femoroprecloacal pores and a single cloacal spur (postanal tubercle).

== Behavior ==
H. harterti is nocturnal and scansorial (adapted for climbing).

== Reproduction ==
Unlike other species of Hemiphyllodactylus which are unisexual (females only), H. harterti is bisexual (males and females).
