= Servarayan Hills =

Mountain range in Tamil Nadu, India

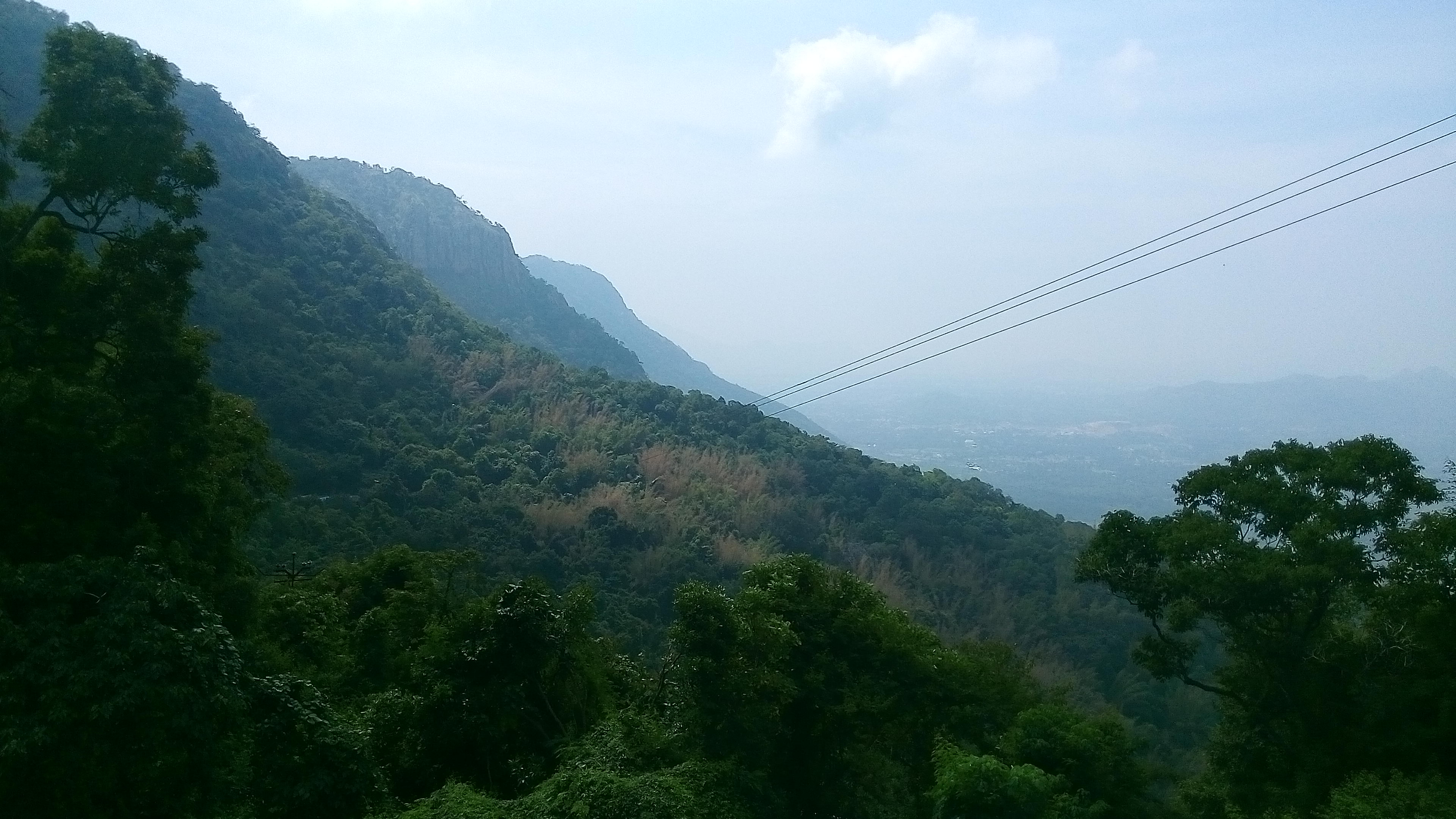
- Servarayan Hills

Highest point
- Elevation: 1,620 m (5,310 ft)
- Coordinates: 11°50′0″N 78°16′0″E

Naming
- Native name: Servarayan Hills (Tamil)

Geography
- Location within Tamil Nadu
- Location: Salem, Tamil Nadu, India
- Parent range: Eastern Ghats

The Servarayan hills, with the anglicised name Shevaroy Hills, are a mountain range (1620 m) near the city of Salem, in Tamil Nadu state, southern India.

The local Tamil name comes from a local deity, Servarayan.

== Geography ==
The Servarayans form part of the southern ranges of the Eastern Ghats System. Shevaroys cover an area of 400 square kilometres (99,000 acres), with plateaus from 4,000–5,000 feet (1,200–1,500 m) above sea-level. The main town here is Yercaud. The mountain range includes the Solaikaradu peak, which at 1620 m above mean sea-level is the highest peak in the southern part of the Eastern Ghats. It is nestled parallel to the lower Chitteri hills - Kalrayan hills, just north of the Kolli Hills and Pachaimalai Hills. Westwards, lie the Mettur hills. This range forms an important link in the southern part of Eastern Ghats hill chain.

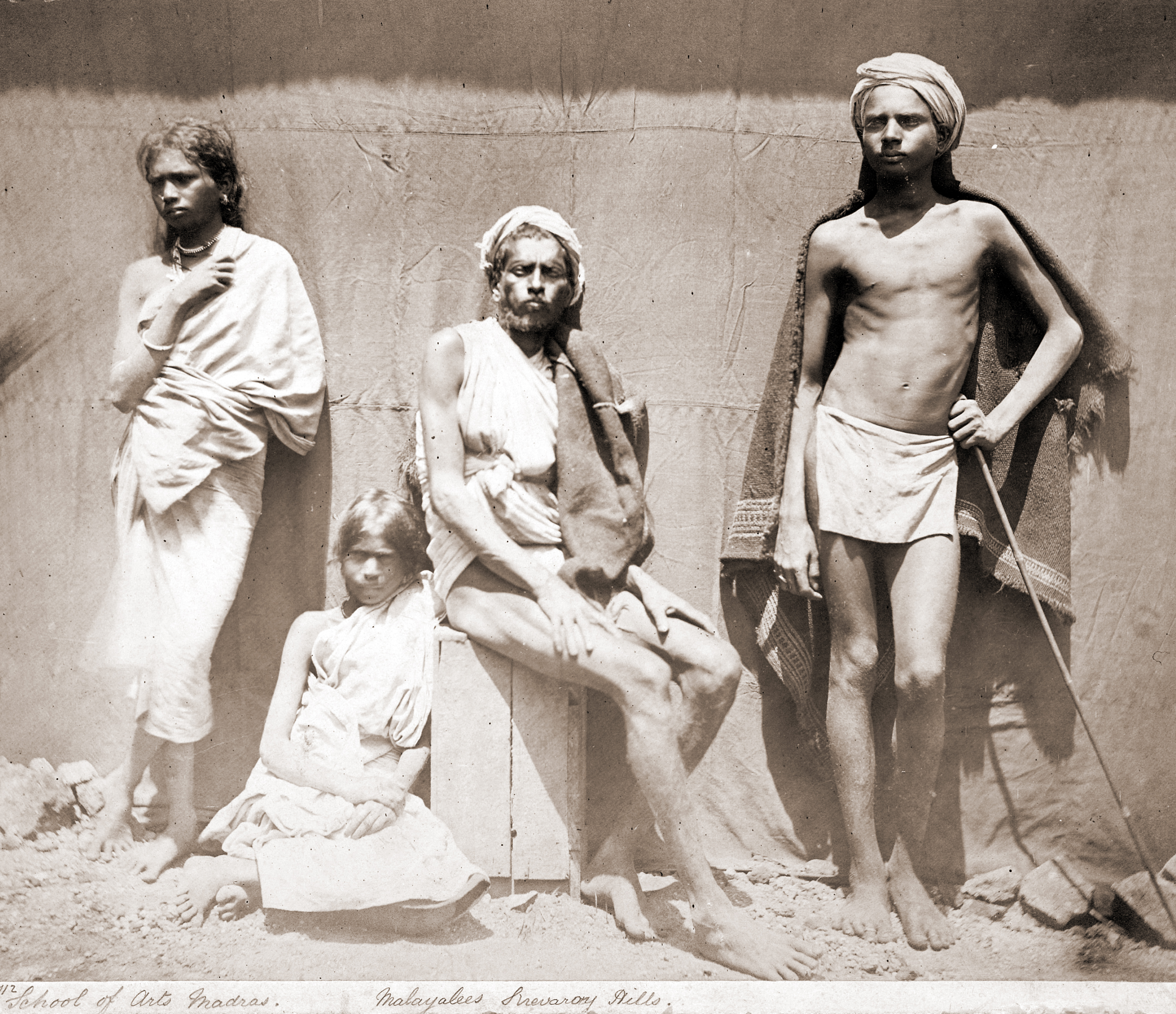
A 1860 photo of Malaiyalis or, hill-dwellers of the Shevaroy Hills

== Features ==
The Servarayan hills have several old coffee plantations, and a sanatorium. The major areas of tourist interest are the Yercaud Orchidarium of the Botanical Survey of India, and the old coffee estates.

== Flora and fauna ==
Some patches of the original forests still exist in the Shevaroy hills and those in higher slopes and peaks contain several endemic species of plants and fauna. The faunal and floral elements high up here have stark similarities to the Western Ghats. Such highlights include Strobilanthes kunthiana (Neelakurinji) in the peaks here, which apart from upper reaches of Western Ghats, is not known from the Eastern Ghats elsewhere. Natural forests apart, coffee and citrus fruits, most notably oranges, are grown in abundance, as well as bananas, pears and jackfruit.

Fauna such as gaur, sambar deer, spotted deer, Indian pangolin, jackals, hares, foxes, mangoose, civets, giant squirrels, and many reptiles including endemic ones such Hemiphyllodactylus aurantiacus, Calotes calotes, Monilesaurus rouxii, Mabuya beddomii and shield tail snake like Uropeltis ellioti and Uropeltis shorttii (which is endemic to the hill range), the endangered Python molurus, Rhabdophis plumbicolor, Calliophis beddomei and Trimeresurus gramineus; endemic amphibians such as Hylarana, Raorchestes, Fejervarya and scores of birds like the whistling thrush, racket-tailed drongo, peacock, shama, Oriental leafbird and Indian grey hornbill occur in Shevaroy Hills.
