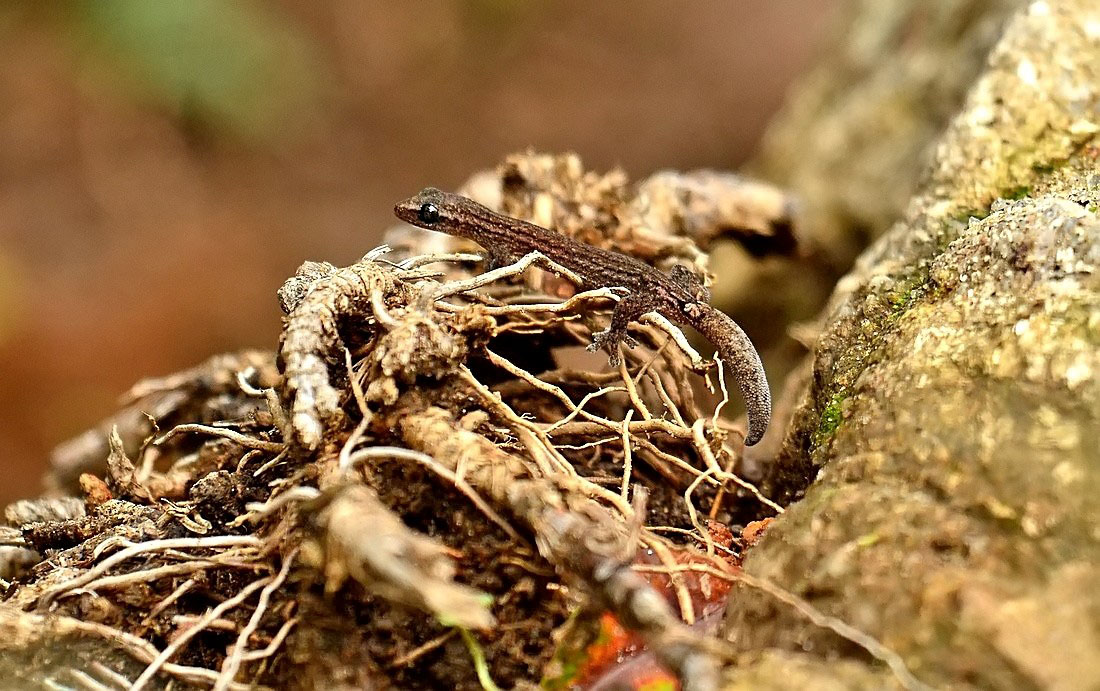

Conservation status
- Critically Endangered (IUCN 3.1)

Scientific classification
- Kingdom: Animalia
- Phylum: Chordata
- Class: Reptilia
- Order: Squamata
- Suborder: Gekkota
- Family: Gekkonidae
- Genus: Hemiphyllodactylus
- Species: H. aurantiacus

Binomial name
- Hemiphyllodactylus aurantiacus (Beddome, 1870)
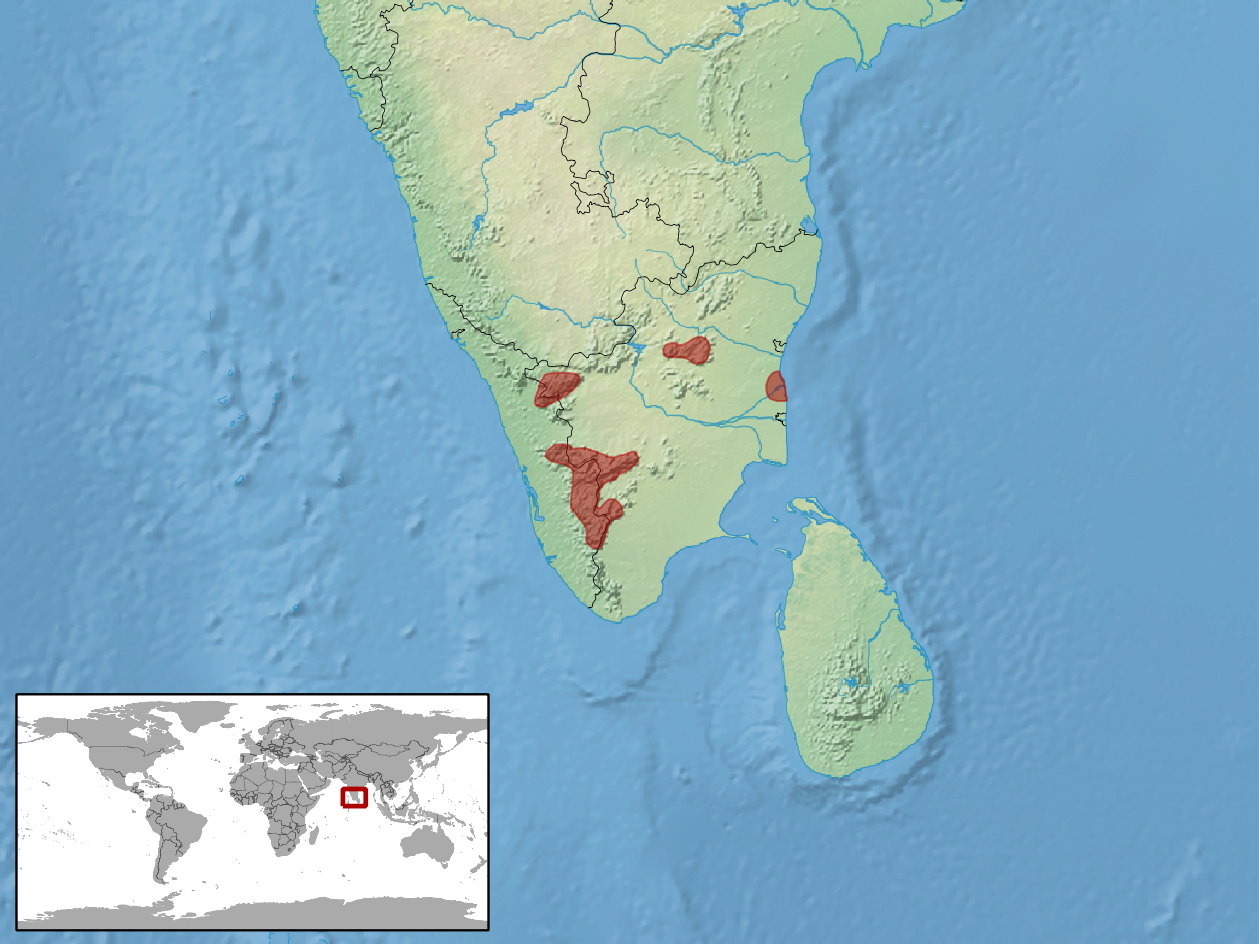

Synonyms
- Hemiphyllodactylus typus ssp. aurantiacus (Beddome, 1870)

= Southern Ghats slender gecko =

Species of lizard

The Southern Ghats slender gecko (Hemiphyllodactylus aurantiacus) is a species of gecko with a restricted distribution in the hills of southern India.

== Description ==
Head oviform, longer than broad; snout rounded, very convex, slightly shorter than, distance between eye and ear-opening, l.3 times the diameter of orbit; ear-opening very small, round. Body elongate, more so in females than in males; limbs short, fore limb measuring half the distance between axilla and groin, or rather less. Digits short, free, inner very small, rudimentary; only two large chevron-shaped divided lamellae under the distal part of the digits, followed by transverse undivided lamellae, decreasing in width. Head covered with very minute granules; rostral and mental very small, former four-sided, latter pentagonal or triangular; nostril pierced between rostral, first labial, and several granules; labials very small, 9 or 10 upper and as many lower, no chin-shields. Back covered with very small granular scales, abdominal scales a little larger, flat, imbricate. Male with an angular series of 7 to 9 preanal pores. Tail cylindrical, tapering, covered with small imbricated smooth scales, larger below. Grey-brown above, with, along the head and back, dark-brown undulating lines, which may be broken up into spots; a dark brown streak from the tip of the snout to the fore limb, passing through the eye; whitish dots scattered on the head and back; tail with darker spots or annuli and two large whitish black-edged spots at the base, frequently and two large whitish black-edged spots at the base, frequently confluent mesially. Lower surfaces whitish, more or less speckled with brownish.

From snout to vent 1.4 in (36 mm); tail 1.25 in (32 mm).

== Distribution ==
S India (Anamallays = Anailmalais, Western Ghats, Bangalore, Kolli Hills) Type locality: "Shevaroys, under stones about Yercaud and elsewhere, at an elevation of 4,000 feet".
