= Jelawang bent-toed gecko =

Scientific classification
- Kingdom: Animalia
- Phylum: Chordata
- Class: Reptilia
- Order: Squamata
- Suborder: Gekkota
- Family: Gekkonidae
- Genus: Cyrtodactylus
- Species: C. jelawangensis

Binomial name
- Cyrtodactylus jelawangensis Grismer, Wood, Anuar, Quah, Muin, Mohamed, Onn, Sumarli, Loredo & Heinz, 2014

Species of lizard

The Jelawang bent-toed gecko (Cyrtodactylus jelawangensis) is a species of gecko that is endemic to peninsular Malaysia.
