= Cyrtodactylus pinlaungensis =

Scientific classification
- Kingdom: Animalia
- Phylum: Chordata
- Class: Reptilia
- Order: Squamata
- Suborder: Gekkota
- Family: Gekkonidae
- Genus: Cyrtodactylus
- Species: C. pinlaungensis

Binomial name
- Cyrtodactylus pinlaungensis Grismer, Wood, Quah, Thura, Oaks, & Lin, 2019

Species of lizard

Cyrtodactylus pinlaungensis, the Pinlaung bent-toed gecko, is a species of gecko endemic to Myanmar.
