= Cyrtodactylus payacola =

Scientific classification
- Kingdom: Animalia
- Phylum: Chordata
- Class: Reptilia
- Order: Squamata
- Suborder: Gekkota
- Family: Gekkonidae
- Genus: Cyrtodactylus
- Species: C. payacola

Binomial name
- Cyrtodactylus payacola Johnson, Quah Anuar, Muin, Wood, Grismer, Greer, Onn, Ahmad, Bauer, & Grismer, 2012

Species of lizard

Cyrtodactylus payacola is a species of gecko that is endemic to western Malaysia.
