= Tebu Mountain bent-toed gecko =

Scientific classification
- Kingdom: Animalia
- Phylum: Chordata
- Class: Reptilia
- Order: Squamata
- Suborder: Gekkota
- Family: Gekkonidae
- Genus: Cyrtodactylus
- Species: C. tebuensis

Binomial name
- Cyrtodactylus tebuensis Grismer, Anuar, Muin, Quah, & Wood, 2013

Species of lizard

The Tebu Mountain bent-toed gecko (Cyrtodactylus tebuensis) is a species of gecko that is endemic to peninsular Malaysia.
