= Cyrtodactylus evanquahi =

Scientific classification
- Kingdom: Animalia
- Phylum: Chordata
- Class: Reptilia
- Order: Squamata
- Suborder: Gekkota
- Family: Gekkonidae
- Genus: Cyrtodactylus
- Species: C. evanquahi

Binomial name
- Cyrtodactylus evanquahi Wood, Grismer, Muin, Anuar & Oaks, 2020

Species of lizard

Cyrtodactylus evanquahi or Evan Quah's banded bent-toed gecko is a species of lizard in the family Gekkonidae. The species is endemic to Malaysia.

== Etymology ==
The specific name, evanquahi, is in honor of Malaysian herpetologist Evan Seng Huat Quah.

== Geographic range ==
C. evanquahi is found in northwestern Peninsular Malaysia, in Kedah state.

== Description ==
C. evanquahi may attain a snout-to-vent length of 9.6 cm (3.8 in).

== Reproduction ==
The mode of reproduction of C. evanquahi is unknown.
