= Tytthoscincus jaripendek =

Scientific classification
- Kingdom: Animalia
- Phylum: Chordata
- Class: Reptilia
- Order: Squamata
- Family: Scincidae
- Genus: Tytthoscincus
- Species: T. jaripendek

Binomial name
- Tytthoscincus jaripendek Grismer, Wood, Quah, Anuar, Ngadi, Mohd-Izam, & Ahmad, 2017

Species of lizard

Tytthoscincus jaripendek, the Cameron Highlands forest skink, is a species of skink. It is endemic to Malaysia.
