= Cyrtodactylus laangensis =

Scientific classification
- Kingdom: Animalia
- Phylum: Chordata
- Class: Reptilia
- Order: Squamata
- Suborder: Gekkota
- Family: Gekkonidae
- Genus: Cyrtodactylus
- Species: C. laangensis

Binomial name
- Cyrtodactylus laangensis Murdoch, Grismer, Wood, Neang, Poyarkov, Ngo, Nazarov, Aowphol, Pauwels, Nguyen, & Grismer, 2019

Species of lizard

Cyrtodactylus laangensis, also known as the Phnom Laang bent-toed gecko, is a species of gecko endemic to Cambodia.
