= Tytthoscincus martae =

Scientific classification
- Kingdom: Animalia
- Phylum: Chordata
- Class: Reptilia
- Order: Squamata
- Family: Scincidae
- Genus: Tytthoscincus
- Species: T. martae

Binomial name
- Tytthoscincus martae Grismer, Wood, Quah, Anuar, Ngadi, Mohd-Izam, & Ahmad, 2017

Species of lizard

Tytthoscincus martae, the Hindu temple forest skink, is a species of skink. It is a leaf litter generalist endemic to Malaysia.

Its common name refers to a Hindu temple 1.2 km south of Fraser's Hill, a colonial town in Malaysia. The species name 'martae' honours American herpetologist Marta S. Grismer for her fieldwork in Southeast Asia and Latin America and work generating morphological datasets.
