= Rosichonariefi's bent-toed gecko =

Scientific classification
- Kingdom: Animalia
- Phylum: Chordata
- Class: Reptilia
- Order: Squamata
- Suborder: Gekkota
- Family: Gekkonidae
- Genus: Cyrtodactylus
- Species: C. rosichonarieforum

Binomial name
- Cyrtodactylus rosichonarieforum Riyanto, Grismer & Wood, 2015

Synonyms
- Cyrtodactylus rosichonariefi Riyanto, Grismer & Wood, 2015; Cyrtodactylus rosichonarieforum — Amarasinghe et al., 2020

Species of lizard

Rosichonariefi's bent-toed gecko (Cyrtodactylus rosichonarieforum) is a species of lizard in the family Gekkonidae. The species is endemic to the island of Natuna Besar in Indonesia.

== Etymology ==
The specific name – rosichonarieforum (masculine, genitive, plural) – is in honor of Rosichon Ubaidillah and Ahmad Jauhar Arief, both of whom are Indonesian scientists.

== Description ==
Small for its genus, C. rosichonarieforum may attain a snout-to-vent length (SVL) of 5.5 cm (2.2 in).

== Reproduction ==
The mode of reproduction of C. rosichonarieforum is unknown.
