= Cyrtodactylus pyadalinensis =

Scientific classification
- Kingdom: Animalia
- Phylum: Chordata
- Class: Reptilia
- Order: Squamata
- Suborder: Gekkota
- Family: Gekkonidae
- Genus: Cyrtodactylus
- Species: C. pyadalinensis

Binomial name
- Cyrtodactylus pyadalinensis Grismer, Wood, Thura, Win, & Quah, 2019

Species of gecko

Cyrtodactylus pyadalinensis is a species of gecko endemic to Myanmar.
