= Cyrtodactylus chaunghanakwaensis =

Scientific classification
- Kingdom: Animalia
- Phylum: Chordata
- Class: Reptilia
- Order: Squamata
- Suborder: Gekkota
- Family: Gekkonidae
- Genus: Cyrtodactylus
- Species: C. chaunghanakwaensis

Binomial name
- Cyrtodactylus chaunghanakwaensis Grismer, Wood Jr., Thura, Quah, Murdoch, Grismer, Herr, Lin, & Kyaw, 2018

Species of lizard

Cyrtodactylus chaunghanakwaensis, also known as the Chaunghanakwa Hill bent-toed gecko, is a species of gecko endemic to Myanmar.
