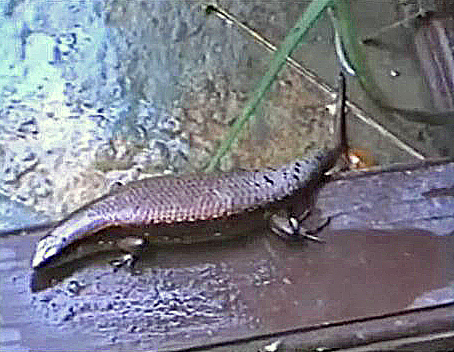
- Tytthoscincus temasekensis from Singapore

Scientific classification
- Kingdom: Animalia
- Phylum: Chordata
- Class: Reptilia
- Order: Squamata
- Family: Scincidae
- Genus: Tytthoscincus
- Species: T. temasekensis

Binomial name
- Tytthoscincus temasekensis Grismer, Wood Jr., Lim, & Liang, 2017

= Tytthoscincus temasekensis =

Species of lizard

Tytthoscincus temasekensis, common name Singapore swamp skink, is a species of skinks belonging to the family Scincidae.

== Etymology ==
The species name temasekensis derives from the word Temasek meaning 'Sea Town' in Old Javanese, an ancient name of a settlement in Singapore. As the Latin suffix -ensis means 'from a place', the epithet temasekensis can be translated from Singapore.

== Distribution ==
This uncommon species is present in Singapore, and in restricted areas of the Peninsular Malaysia.

== Habitat ==
The Singapore swamp skink occurs in freshwater swamp forest, in peat swamp areas and close to shallow streams.

== Description ==
Tytthoscincus temasekensis can reach a total body length of about 7.6 cm (3.0 in). These small skinks have an elongate and dorso-ventrally flattened body, with smooth scales. Limbs and feet are tiny, short and slender. Its dorsal basic colour is dark brown, with a pale line from the head to the end of the tail. The abdomen is pale brownish. Young skinks are pale brown and slightly pinkish.

== Behavior ==
These skinks are skilled swimmers and very elusive, usually hiding amongst or beneath leaf litter next to streams or swamps.
