= Tytthoscincus perhentianensis =

Conservation status
- Least Concern (IUCN 3.1)

Scientific classification
- Kingdom: Animalia
- Phylum: Chordata
- Class: Reptilia
- Order: Squamata
- Family: Scincidae
- Genus: Tytthoscincus
- Species: T. perhentianensis

Binomial name
- Tytthoscincus perhentianensis Grismer, Wood, & Grismer, 2009

Species of lizard

Tytthoscincus perhentianensis, the Perhentian Island forest skink, is a species of skink. It is endemic to Perhentian Islands in Malaysia.
