= Linno Cave bent-toed gecko =

Scientific classification
- Kingdom: Animalia
- Phylum: Chordata
- Class: Reptilia
- Order: Squamata
- Suborder: Gekkota
- Family: Gekkonidae
- Genus: Cyrtodactylus
- Species: C. linnoensis

Binomial name
- Cyrtodactylus linnoensis Grismer, Wood Jr., Thura, Zin, Quah, Murdoch, Grismer, Lin, Kyaw, & Lwin, 2017

Species of lizard

The Linno Cave bent-toed gecko (Cyrtodactylus linnoensis) is a species of gecko that is endemic to Myanmar.
