= Fraser's Hill forest skink =

There are two species of skink named Fraser's Hill forest skink:

- Tytthoscincus bukitensis, endemic to Peninsular Malaysia
- Tytthoscincus kakikecil, endemic to Malaysia
