= Sadan Sin Cave bent-toed gecko =

Scientific classification
- Kingdom: Animalia
- Phylum: Chordata
- Class: Reptilia
- Order: Squamata
- Suborder: Gekkota
- Family: Gekkonidae
- Genus: Cyrtodactylus
- Species: C. sadansinensis

Binomial name
- Cyrtodactylus sadansinensis Grismer, Wood Jr., Thura, Zin, Quah, Murdoch, Grismer, Lin, Kyaw, & Lwin, 2017

Species of lizard

The Sadan Sin Cave bent-toed gecko (Cyrtodactylus sadansinensis) is a species of gecko that is endemic to Myanmar.
