= Cyrtodactylus maelanoi =

Scientific classification
- Kingdom: Animalia
- Phylum: Chordata
- Class: Reptilia
- Order: Squamata
- Suborder: Gekkota
- Family: Gekkonidae
- Genus: Cyrtodactylus
- Species: C. maelanoi

Binomial name
- Cyrtodactylus maelanoi Grismer, Rujirawan, Termprayoon, Ampai, Yodthong, Wood, Oaks, & Aowphol, 2020

Species of lizard

Cyrtodactylus maelanoi is a species of gecko that is endemic to Thailand.
