= Gunung Senyum bent-toed gecko =

Scientific classification
- Kingdom: Animalia
- Phylum: Chordata
- Class: Reptilia
- Order: Squamata
- Suborder: Gekkota
- Family: Gekkonidae
- Genus: Cyrtodactylus
- Species: C. gunungsenyumensis

Binomial name
- Cyrtodactylus gunungsenyumensis Grismer, Wood, Anuar, Davis, Cobos, & Murdoch, 2016

Species of gecko endemic to Malaysia

The Gunung Senyum bent-toed gecko (Cyrtodactylus gunungsenyumensis) is a species of gecko that is endemic to Malaysia.
