= Cyrtodactylus metropolis =

Scientific classification
- Kingdom: Animalia
- Phylum: Chordata
- Class: Reptilia
- Order: Squamata
- Suborder: Gekkota
- Family: Gekkonidae
- Genus: Cyrtodactylus
- Species: C. metropolis

Binomial name
- Cyrtodactylus metropolis Grismer, Wood, Onn, Anuar, & Muin, 2014

Species of lizard

Cyrtodactylus metropolis is a species of gecko that is endemic to peninsular Malaysia.
