= Cnemaspis mcguirei =

Conservation status
- Least Concern (IUCN 3.1)

Scientific classification
- Kingdom: Animalia
- Phylum: Chordata
- Class: Reptilia
- Order: Squamata
- Suborder: Gekkota
- Family: Gekkonidae
- Genus: Cnemaspis
- Species: C. mcguirei

Binomial name
- Cnemaspis mcguirei L. Grismer, J. Grismer, Wood & Chan, 2008

Species of lizard

Cnemaspis mcguirei, also known commonly as McGuire's rock gecko and the Bitang round-eyed gecko, is a species of lizard in the family Gekkonidae. The species is native to Peninsular Malaysia and Thailand.

== Etymology ==
The specific name, mcguirei, is in honor of American herpetologist Jimmy A. McGuire.

== Description ==
Cnemaspis mcguirei may attain a snout-to-vent length (SVL) of 6.5 cm (2.6 in). The male has a yellow-centered black eyespot in the shoulder region.

== Geographic distribution ==
Cnemaspis mcguirei is found in northern Peninsular Malaysia and adjacent extreme southern Thailand.

== Habitat ==
The preferred natural habitat of Cnemaspis mcguirei is forest, at altitudes of 500–1,351 m (1,640–4,432 ft).

== Behavior ==
Cnemaspis mcguirei is terrestrial and active both day and night.

== Diet ==
Cnemaspis mcguirei preys upon termites.

== Reproduction ==
Cnemaspis mcguirei is oviparous. Clutch size is two eggs, and the species may breed year round.
