= Cyrtodactylus ywanganensis =

Scientific classification
- Kingdom: Animalia
- Phylum: Chordata
- Class: Reptilia
- Order: Squamata
- Suborder: Gekkota
- Family: Gekkonidae
- Genus: Cyrtodactylus
- Species: C. ywanganensis

Binomial name
- Cyrtodactylus ywanganensis Grismer, Wood, Thura, Quah, Murdoch, M. Grismer, Herr, Espinoza, & Lin, 2018

Species of lizard

Cyrtodactylus ywanganensis is a species of gecko endemic to Myanmar.
