= Banjaran Timur bent-toed gecko =

Conservation status
- Least Concern (IUCN 3.1)

Scientific classification
- Kingdom: Animalia
- Phylum: Chordata
- Class: Reptilia
- Order: Squamata
- Suborder: Gekkota
- Family: Gekkonidae
- Genus: Cyrtodactylus
- Species: C. timur

Binomial name
- Cyrtodactylus timur Grismer, Wood, Anuar, Quah, Muin, Mohamed, Onn, Sumarli, Loredo, & Heinz, 2014

Species of lizard

The Banjaran Timur bent-toed gecko (Cyrtodactylus timur) is a species of gecko. It is endemic to northeastern Peninsular Malaysia.
