= Cameron Highlands bent-toed gecko =

Scientific classification
- Kingdom: Animalia
- Phylum: Chordata
- Class: Reptilia
- Order: Squamata
- Suborder: Gekkota
- Family: Gekkonidae
- Genus: Cyrtodactylus
- Species: C. trilatofasciatus

Binomial name
- Cyrtodactylus trilatofasciatus Grismer, Wood Jr., Quah, Anuar, Muin, Sumontha, Ahmad, Bauer, Wangkulangkul, Grismer, & Pauwels, 2012

Species of lizard

The Cameron Highlands bent-toed gecko (Cyrtodactylus trilatofasciatus) is a species of gecko that is endemic to the Cameron Highlands in Malaysia.
