= Sanpel Cave bent-toed gecko =

Scientific classification
- Kingdom: Animalia
- Phylum: Chordata
- Class: Reptilia
- Order: Squamata
- Suborder: Gekkota
- Family: Gekkonidae
- Genus: Cyrtodactylus
- Species: C. sanpelensis

Binomial name
- Cyrtodactylus sanpelensis Grismer, Wood Jr., Thura, Zin, Quah, Murdoch, Grismer, Lin, Kyaw, & Lwin, 2017

Species of lizard

The Sanpel Cave bent-toed gecko (Cyrtodactylus sanpelensis) is a species of gecko that is endemic to Asia. The specific epithet, sanpelensis, is a noun in apposition in reference to the type locality of Sanpel Cave. This species of gecko is widely distributed across southeast Asia, including Myanmar and Thailand.
