= Cyrtodactylus culaochamensis =

Scientific classification
- Kingdom: Animalia
- Phylum: Chordata
- Class: Reptilia
- Order: Squamata
- Suborder: Gekkota
- Family: Gekkonidae
- Genus: Cyrtodactylus
- Species: C. culaochamensis

Binomial name
- Cyrtodactylus culaochamensis Tri, Grismer, Thai, & Wood, 2020

Species of lizard

Cyrtodactylus culaochamensis, the Cù Lao Chàm bent-toed gecko, is a species of gecko that is endemic to Vietnam.
