= Cyrtodactylus septimontium =

Scientific classification
- Kingdom: Animalia
- Phylum: Chordata
- Class: Reptilia
- Order: Squamata
- Suborder: Gekkota
- Family: Gekkonidae
- Genus: Cyrtodactylus
- Species: C. septimontium

Binomial name
- Cyrtodactylus septimontium Murdoch, Grismer, Wood, Neang, Poyarkov, Ngo, Nazarov, Aowphol, Pauwels, Nguyen, & Grismer, 2019

Species of gecko

Cyrtodactylus septimontium, also known as the Bảy Núi bent-toed gecko, is a species of gecko endemic to Vietnam.
