= Cnemaspis pseudomcguirei =

Scientific classification
- Kingdom: Animalia
- Phylum: Chordata
- Class: Reptilia
- Order: Squamata
- Suborder: Gekkota
- Family: Gekkonidae
- Genus: Cnemaspis
- Species: C. pseudomcguirei

Binomial name
- Cnemaspis pseudomcguirei Grismer, Ahmad, Chan, Belabut, Muin, Wood & Grismer, 2009

Species of lizard

Cnemaspis pseudomcguirei, also known as the false McGuire's rock gecko, is a species of gecko endemic to Malaysia.
