= Cyrtodactylus myaleiktaung =

Scientific classification
- Kingdom: Animalia
- Phylum: Chordata
- Class: Reptilia
- Order: Squamata
- Suborder: Gekkota
- Family: Gekkonidae
- Genus: Cyrtodactylus
- Species: C. myaleiktaung

Binomial name
- Cyrtodactylus myaleiktaung Grismer, Wood, Thura, Win, Grismer, Trueblood, & Quah, 2018

Species of gecko

Cyrtodactylus myaleiktaung, also known as the Mya Leik Taung bent-toed gecko, is a species of gecko endemic to Myanmar.
