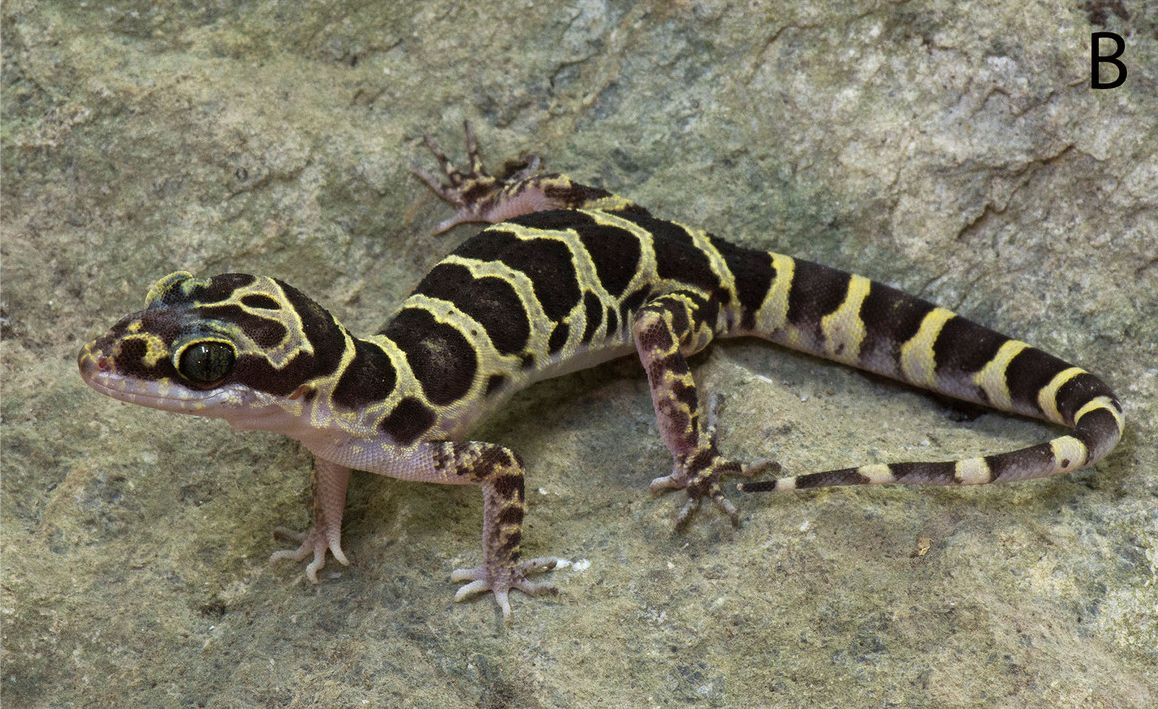
- Cyrtodactylus pyinyaungensis from Pyinyaung Village, Mandalay Region, Myanmar

Scientific classification
- Kingdom: Animalia
- Phylum: Chordata
- Class: Reptilia
- Order: Squamata
- Suborder: Gekkota
- Family: Gekkonidae
- Genus: Cyrtodactylus
- Species: C. pyinyaungensis

Binomial name
- Cyrtodactylus pyinyaungensis Grismer, Wood Jr., Thura, Zin, Quah, Murdoch, Grismer, Lin, Kyaw & Lwin, 2017

= Pyinyaung bent-toed gecko =

Species of lizard

The Pyinyaung bent-toed gecko (Cyrtodactylus pyinyaungensis) is a species of gecko that is endemic to Myanmar.
