= Tytthoscincus monticolus =

Scientific classification
- Kingdom: Animalia
- Phylum: Chordata
- Class: Reptilia
- Order: Squamata
- Family: Scincidae
- Genus: Tytthoscincus
- Species: T. monticolus

Binomial name
- Tytthoscincus monticolus Grismer, Wood Jr., Ahmad, Baizul-Hafsyam, Afiq-Shuhaimi, Rizal, & Quah, 2018

Species of lizard

Tytthoscincus monticolus, the Sungai Bubu forest skink, is a species of skink. It is endemic to Malaysia.
