= Cyrtodactylus dayangbuntingensis =

Scientific classification
- Kingdom: Animalia
- Phylum: Chordata
- Class: Reptilia
- Order: Squamata
- Suborder: Gekkota
- Family: Gekkonidae
- Genus: Cyrtodactylus
- Species: C. dayangbuntingensis

Binomial name
- Cyrtodactylus dayangbuntingensis Quah, Grismer, Wood Jr., & Sah, 2019

Species of lizard

Cyrtodactylus dayangbuntingensis is a species of gecko endemic to peninsular Malaysia.
