= Mount Lumarku =

Mountain in Malaysia

Highest point
- Elevation: 1,966 m (6,450 ft)
- Listing: Ribu

Naming
- Native name: Gunung Lumarku (Malay)

Geography
- Location: Interior Division, Sabah, Malaysia

Mount Lumarku or Lumaku (Malay: Gunung Lumarku) is a mountain located southeast of Sipitang in the Interior Division of Sabah, Malaysia, and is the highest point of the Sipitang District, with an elevation of 1,966 metres (6,450 ft) above sea level. The mountain has prominent biodiversity, and is part of the Gunong Lumaku Forest Reserve, under the surveillance of the Sabah Forestry Department.

== Geology ==
Mount Lumarku rests on a discontinuous geological formation at the southern end of the Crocker Mountains and the northern part of the Meligan Range.

== Biodiversity ==
The mountain's surrounding rain forest exhibit a high degree of species richness, together with much of Sabah's montane rain forests.

The pitcher plant species Nepenthes fusca, N. hurrelliana, and N. tentaculata are native to this mountain. Approximately 127 species of mosses were discovered in Mount Lumarku, equivalent to nearly one-fifth of Borneo's moss taxa.

Borneo-specific fauna available include frog species, Philautus bunitus, and skink species Tytthoscincus aesculeticola and Sphenomorphus kinabaluensis. Several bulbuls such as Temminck's babbler (Pellorneum pyrrogenys), the ochraceous bulbul (Alophoixus ochraceus), the Grey-throated babbler (Stachyris nigriceps), and the streaky-breasted spiderhunter (Arachnothera affinis). Mount Lumarku's rain forest also exhibit high insect diversity. In one notable case, a new termite genus under the Nasutitermitinae subfamily, Sabahitermes, consisting of its single type species, Sabahitermes malakuni, was discovered here in 1997.

=== Threats and conservation ===
Mount Lumarku's rain forest is protected as the Gunong Lumaku Forest Reserve, established in 1992 under the surveillance of the Sabah Forestry Department, with an area of 6,665 hectares (16,470 acres). Mount Lumarku's protected rain forest exhibit a degree of deforestation leakage 0.14% annual rate, with a much higher degree of deforestation in its surrounding buffer zone with 1.56%.
