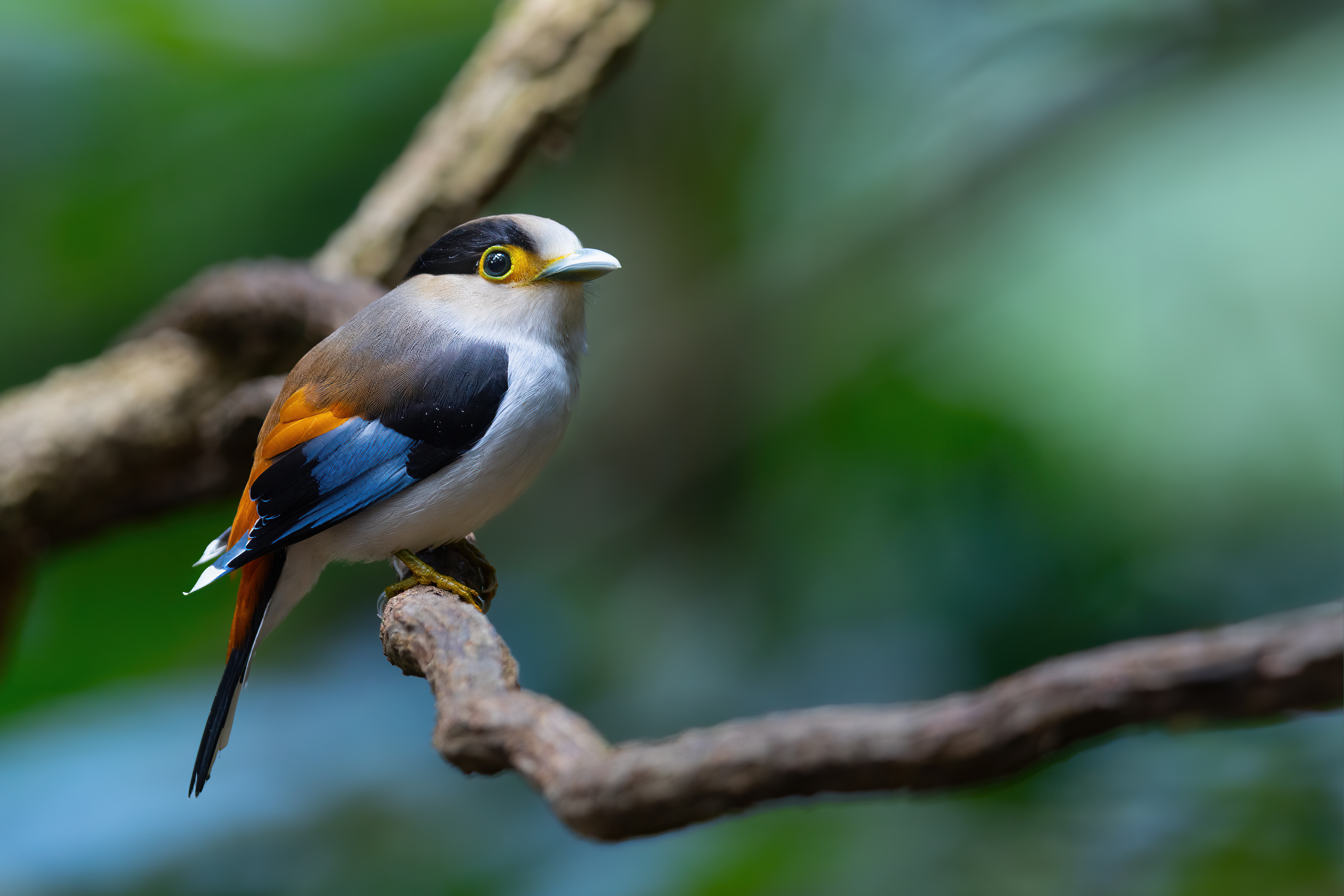
- Male in Vietnam
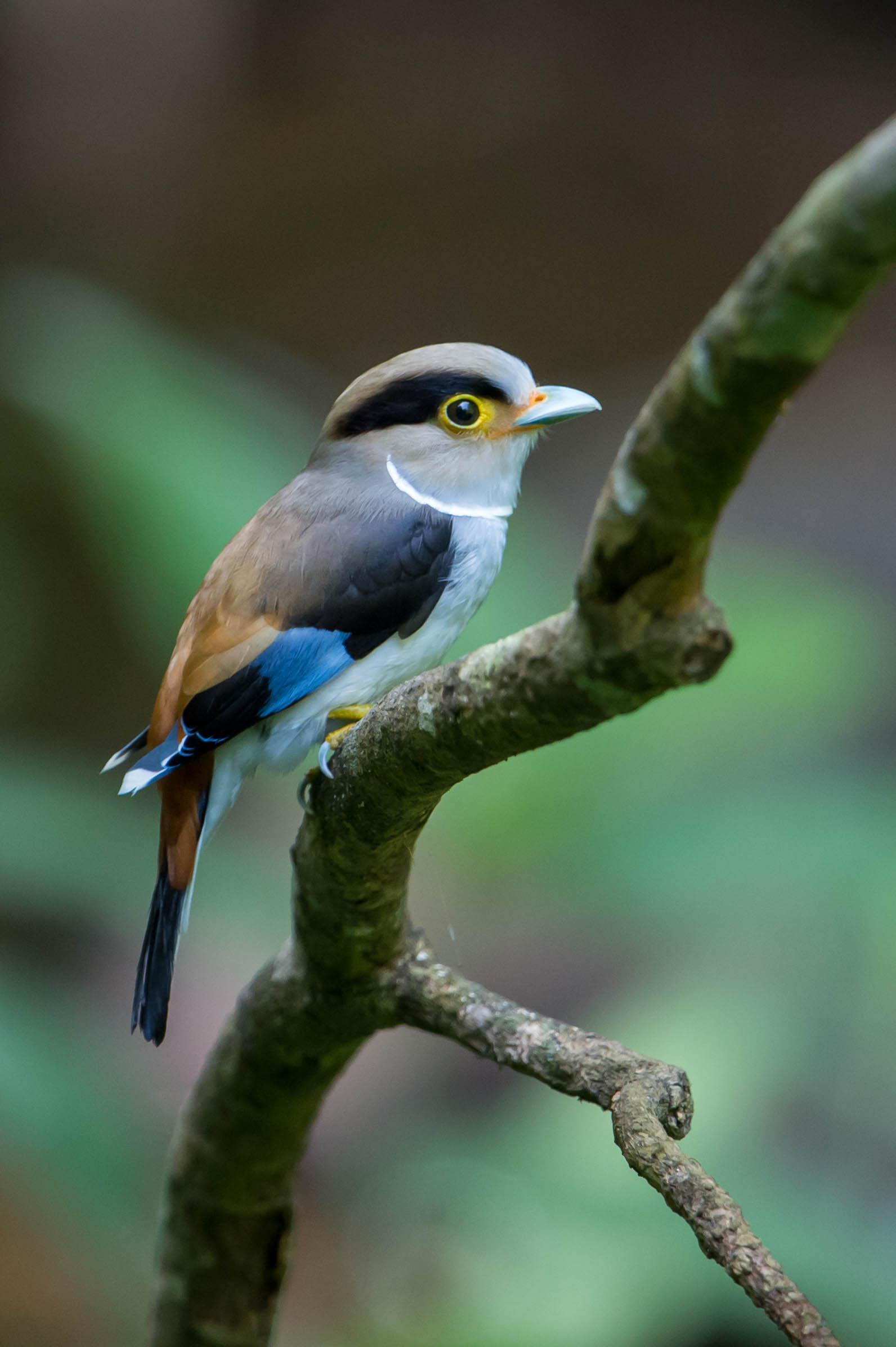
- Female in Thailand

Conservation status
- Least Concern (IUCN 3.1)

Scientific classification
- Kingdom: Animalia
- Phylum: Chordata
- Class: Aves
- Order: Passeriformes
- Family: Eurylaimidae
- Genus: Serilophus
- Species: S. lunatus

Binomial name
- Serilophus lunatus (Gould, 1834)

= Silver-breasted broadbill =

Species of bird

The silver-breasted broadbill (Serilophus lunatus) is a species of bird in the broadbill family, Eurylaimidae that is found in parts of Southeast Asia. There are seven currently recognised subspecies; the other species in the genus Serilophus, the grey-lored broadbill, was also previously treated as being a subspecies of this species.

== Taxonomy ==
The silver-breasted broadbill was formally described in 1834 by the English ornithologist John Gould. He placed it in the genus Eurylaimus and coined the binomial name Eurylaimus lunatus. The specific epithet is Latin meaning "crescent-shaped" of "sickle-shaped", from Latin luna meaning "moon". Gould specified the type locality as the neighbourhood of Rangoon (now Yangon) in Myanmar but the locality was subsequently restricted to the hills in the region of Bago, which lie to the north of Yangon.

The silver-breasted broadbill is now one of two species placed in the genus Serilophus that was introduced in 1837 by William Swainson. The other species in Serilophus, the grey-lored broadbill, was formerly considered to be a subspecies of the silver-breasted broadbill.

Seven subspecies are recognised:

- S. l. elisabethae La Touche, 1921 – central Myanmar to northeast Thailand, north, central Laos, north Vietnam and south China; also southeast Thailand and Cambodia
- S. l. polionotus Rothschild, 1903 – Hainan Island (off southeast China)
- S. l. lunatus (Gould, 1834) – south Myanmar and northwest Thailand
- S. l. impavidus Deignan, 1948 – south Laos
- S. l. stolidus Robinson & Kloss, 1919 – southwest Thailand and Malay Peninsula (except south)
- S. l. rothschildi Hartert, EJO & Butler, AL, 1898 – montane south Malay Peninsula
- S. l. intensus Robinson & Kloss, 1916 – montane Sumatra

== Description ==
The silver-breasted broadbill is a medium-sized broadbill, 16–17 centimetres (6.3–6.7 in) in length and weighing 25–35 grams (0.9–1.2 oz). The plumage of the nominate race has a rusty-coloured head with an ash-grey forehead and a broad black supercilium (stripe) over the eye. The breast and belly is white and the rump and upper wing coverts are bright rufous. The flight feathers are striking blue and black and the tail is black. There is a small amount of sexual dimorphism in the plumage, with the female having a narrow silver band across the breast. Young birds resemble adults but with shorter wings and tails, and slightly darker plumage overall. There is also some variation across the different subspecies.

== Distribution and habitat ==
The silver-breasted broadbill is found in Cambodia, China, Indonesia, Laos, Malaysia, Myanmar, Nepal, Thailand, and Vietnam. Its natural habitats are subtropical or tropical moist lowland forest and subtropical or tropical moist montane forest. The species has declined somewhat due to habitat loss, but is not considered to be threatened with extinction.

It occupies a range of forest habitats. It occurs in tropical and semi-tropical forests, as well as semi-deciduous forests and forests dominated by pine, oak and bamboo. It may occur in selectively logged forests and even entered agricultural land and gardens. It occurs at a range of elevations across its range; between 800–2,000 metres (2,600–6,600 ft) in Sumatra but 300–700 m (980–2,300 ft) in China.

== Behaviour ==
=== Food and feeding ===
The silver-breasted broadbill eats invertebrates, primarily insects: grasshoppers, mantises, caterpillars, larvae, as well as small land snails. These are taken by flycatching from perch or by gleaning branches and foliage.
