= Cnemaspis harimau =

Scientific classification
- Kingdom: Animalia
- Phylum: Chordata
- Class: Reptilia
- Order: Squamata
- Suborder: Gekkota
- Family: Gekkonidae
- Genus: Cnemaspis
- Species: C. harimau

Binomial name
- Cnemaspis harimau Chan, Grismer, Anuar, Quah, Muin, Savage, Grismer, Ahmad, Remigio & Greer, 2010

Species of lizard

Cnemaspis harimau, also known as the tiger rock gecko, is a species of gecko endemic to Malaysia.
