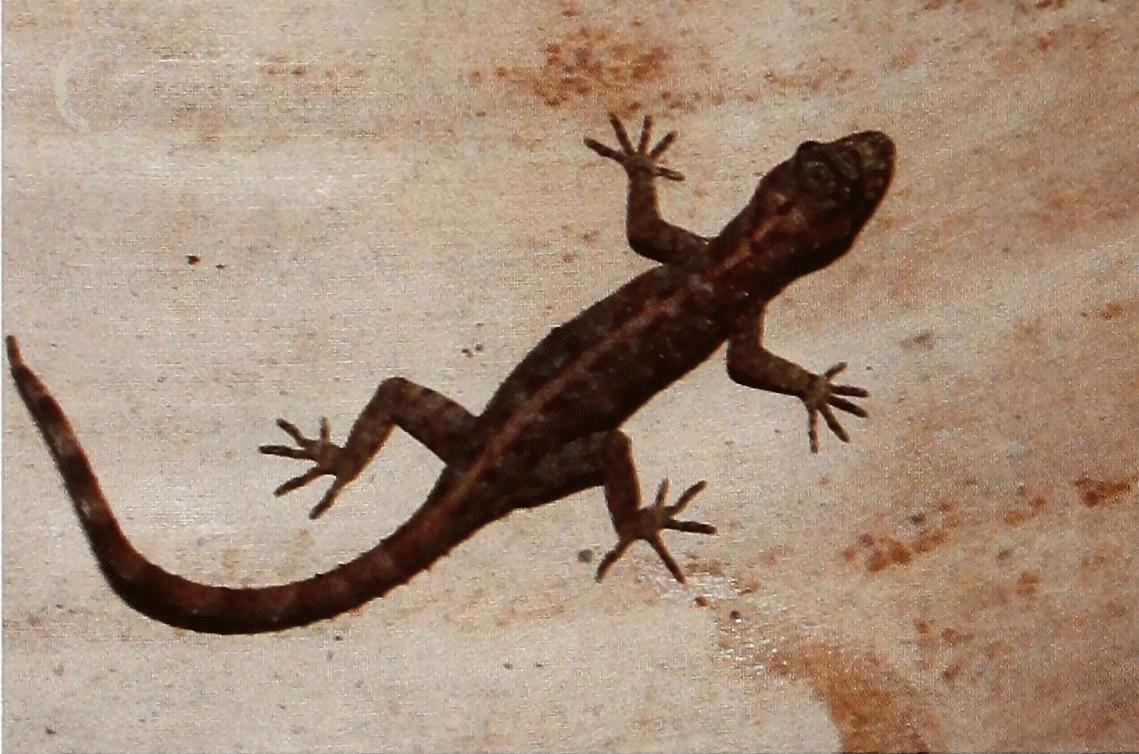

Scientific classification
- Kingdom: Animalia
- Phylum: Chordata
- Class: Reptilia
- Order: Squamata
- Suborder: Gekkota
- Family: Gekkonidae
- Genus: Cnemaspis
- Species: C. shahruli

Binomial name
- Cnemaspis shahruli Grismer, Chan, Quah, Muin, Savage, Grismer, Ahmad, Greer & Remegio, 2010

= Cnemaspis shahruli =

Species of lizard

Cnemaspis shahruli, also known as the Shahrul's rock gecko, is a species of gecko endemic to Malaysia.
