= Tytthoscincus butleri =

Conservation status
- Least Concern (IUCN 3.1)

Scientific classification
- Kingdom: Animalia
- Phylum: Chordata
- Class: Reptilia
- Order: Squamata
- Family: Scincidae
- Genus: Tytthoscincus
- Species: T. butleri

Binomial name
- Tytthoscincus butleri (Boulenger, 1912)

Synonyms
- Lygosoma butleri Boulenger, 1912; Sphenomorphus butleri — Grismer, 2006; Sphenomorphus langkawiensis Grismer, 2008; Tytthoscincus butleri — Grismer et al., 2016

Species of lizard

Tytthoscincus butleri, also known commonly as Butler's forest skink, is a species of lizard in the family Scincidae. The species is native to Malaysia and Thailand.

== Etymology ==
The specific name, butleri, is in honor of British zoologist Arthur Lennox Butler.

== Habitat ==
The preferred natural habitat of T. butleri is forest.

== Reproduction ==
T. butleri is oviparous. The eggs hatch in September.
