= Cyrtodactylus aunglini =

Scientific classification
- Kingdom: Animalia
- Phylum: Chordata
- Class: Reptilia
- Order: Squamata
- Suborder: Gekkota
- Family: Gekkonidae
- Genus: Cyrtodactylus
- Species: C. aunglini

Binomial name
- Cyrtodactylus aunglini L. Grismer, Wood, Thura, Win, M. Grismer, Trueblood & Quah, 2018

Species of gecko

Cyrtodactylus aunglini, also known commonly as the Kyauk Nagar Cave bent-toed gecko, is a species of lizard in the family Gekkonidae. The species is endemic to Myanmar.

== Etymology ==
The specific name, aunglini, is in honor of Burmese conservationist Aung Lin.

== Description ==
Relatively large for its genus, C. aunglini may attain a snout-to-vent length (SVL) of 8 cm (3.1 in).
