= Cyrtodactylus thongphaphumensis =

Scientific classification
- Kingdom: Animalia
- Phylum: Chordata
- Class: Reptilia
- Order: Squamata
- Suborder: Gekkota
- Family: Gekkonidae
- Genus: Cyrtodactylus
- Species: C. thongphaphumensis

Binomial name
- Cyrtodactylus thongphaphumensis Grismer, Rujirawan, Chomdej, Suwannapoom, Yodthong, Aksornneam, & Aowphol, 2023

Species of gecko

Cyrtodactylus thongphaphumensis is a species of gecko endemic to Thailand.
