= Tytthoscincus ishaki =

Conservation status
- Least Concern (IUCN 3.1)

Scientific classification
- Kingdom: Animalia
- Phylum: Chordata
- Class: Reptilia
- Order: Squamata
- Family: Scincidae
- Genus: Tytthoscincus
- Species: T. ishaki

Binomial name
- Tytthoscincus ishaki Grismer, 2006

Synonyms
- Sphenomorphus ishaki Grismer, 2006; Tytthoscincus ishaki — Grismer et al., 2016

Species of lizard

Tytthoscincus ishaki, also known commonly as the Tioman Island forest skink, is a species of lizard in the family Scincidae. The species is endemic to Tioman Island in Malaysia.

== Etymology ==
The specific name, ishaki, is in honor of Muhamad Ishak Mat Sohor, who was Grismer's Malaysian guide during fieldwork on Tioman Island.

== Habitat ==
The preferred natural habitat of T. ishaki is forest, at altitudes of 400–1,026 m (1,312–3,366 ft).

== Description ==
T. ishaki may attain a snout-to-vent length (SVL) of about 4 cm (1.6 in).

== Reproduction ==
The mode of reproduction of T. ishaki is unknown.
