= Shwetaung bent-toed gecko =

Scientific classification
- Kingdom: Animalia
- Phylum: Chordata
- Class: Reptilia
- Order: Squamata
- Suborder: Gekkota
- Family: Gekkonidae
- Genus: Cyrtodactylus
- Species: C. shwetaungorum

Binomial name
- Cyrtodactylus shwetaungorum L. Grismer, Wood, Thura, Zin, Quah, Murdoch, M. Grismer, Lin, Kyaw & Lwin, 2018

Species of lizard

The Shwetaung bent-toed gecko (Cyrtodactylus shwetaungorum) is a species of lizard in the family Gekkonidae. The species is endemic to Myanmar.

== Etymology ==
The specific name, shwetaungorum, is in honor of the Shwe Taung Cement Company for their conservation efforts in Myanmar.

== Geographic range ==
C. shwetaungorum is found in central Myanmar, in Mandalay Region.

== Reproduction ==
The mode of reproduction of C. shwetaungorum is unknown.
