= Cnemaspis omari =

Scientific classification
- Kingdom: Animalia
- Phylum: Chordata
- Class: Reptilia
- Order: Squamata
- Suborder: Gekkota
- Family: Gekkonidae
- Genus: Cnemaspis
- Species: C. omari

Binomial name
- Cnemaspis omari Grismer et al., 2014

Species of lizard

Cnemaspis omari is a species of gecko. It is known from near the Thai-Malaysian border in Perlis State of Malaysia and Satun Province of Thailand. It grows to 41 mm (1.6 in) in snout–vent length.
