= Tytthoscincus temengorensis =

Conservation status
- Near Threatened (IUCN 3.1)

Scientific classification
- Kingdom: Animalia
- Phylum: Chordata
- Class: Reptilia
- Order: Squamata
- Family: Scincidae
- Genus: Tytthoscincus
- Species: T. temengorensis

Binomial name
- Tytthoscincus temengorensis Grismer, Ahmad, & Onn, 2009

Species of lizard

Tytthoscincus temengorensis, the Temengor forest skink, is a species of skink. It is endemic to Malaysia.
