= Cyrtodactylus rivularis =

Scientific classification
- Kingdom: Animalia
- Phylum: Chordata
- Class: Reptilia
- Order: Squamata
- Suborder: Gekkota
- Family: Gekkonidae
- Genus: Cyrtodactylus
- Species: C. rivularis

Binomial name
- Cyrtodactylus rivularis Grismer, Aowphol, Yodthong, Ampai, Termprayoon, Aksornneam, & Rujirawan, 2022

Species of lizard

Cyrtodactylus rivularis, the Pa La-U bent-toed gecko, is a species of gecko endemic to Thailand.
