= Cyrtodactylus nyinyikyawi =

Scientific classification
- Kingdom: Animalia
- Phylum: Chordata
- Class: Reptilia
- Order: Squamata
- Suborder: Gekkota
- Family: Gekkonidae
- Genus: Cyrtodactylus
- Species: C. nyinyikyawi

Binomial name
- Cyrtodactylus nyinyikyawi L. Grismer, Wood, Thura, Win & Quah, 2019

Species of gecko

Cyrtodactylus nyinyikyawi, also known commonly as the Shwe Settaw bent-toed gecko, is a species of lizard in the family Gekkonidae. The species is endemic to Myanmar.

== Etymology ==
The specific name, nyinyikyawi, is in honor of Nyi Nyi Kyaw who is the Director General of the Forest Department of Myanmar.

== Geographic range ==
C. nyinyikyawi is found in central Myanmar, in Magway Region.

== Description ==
A relatively small species for its genus, C. nyinyikyawi may attain a snout-to-vent length (SVL) of 6.6 cm (2.6 in).

== Reproduction ==
The mode of reproduction of C. nyinyikyawi is unknown.
