= Tytthoscincus sibuensis =

Conservation status
- Data Deficient (IUCN 3.1)

Scientific classification
- Kingdom: Animalia
- Phylum: Chordata
- Class: Reptilia
- Order: Squamata
- Family: Scincidae
- Genus: Tytthoscincus
- Species: T. sibuensis

Binomial name
- Tytthoscincus sibuensis Grismer, 2006

Species of lizard

Tytthoscincus sibuensis, the Sibu Island forest skink, is a species of skink. It is endemic to Sibu Island in Malaysia.
