= Tytthoscincus atrigularis =

Conservation status
- Least Concern (IUCN 3.1)

Scientific classification
- Kingdom: Animalia
- Phylum: Chordata
- Class: Reptilia
- Order: Squamata
- Family: Scincidae
- Genus: Tytthoscincus
- Species: T. atrigularis

Binomial name
- Tytthoscincus atrigularis (Stejneger, 1908)

Species of lizard

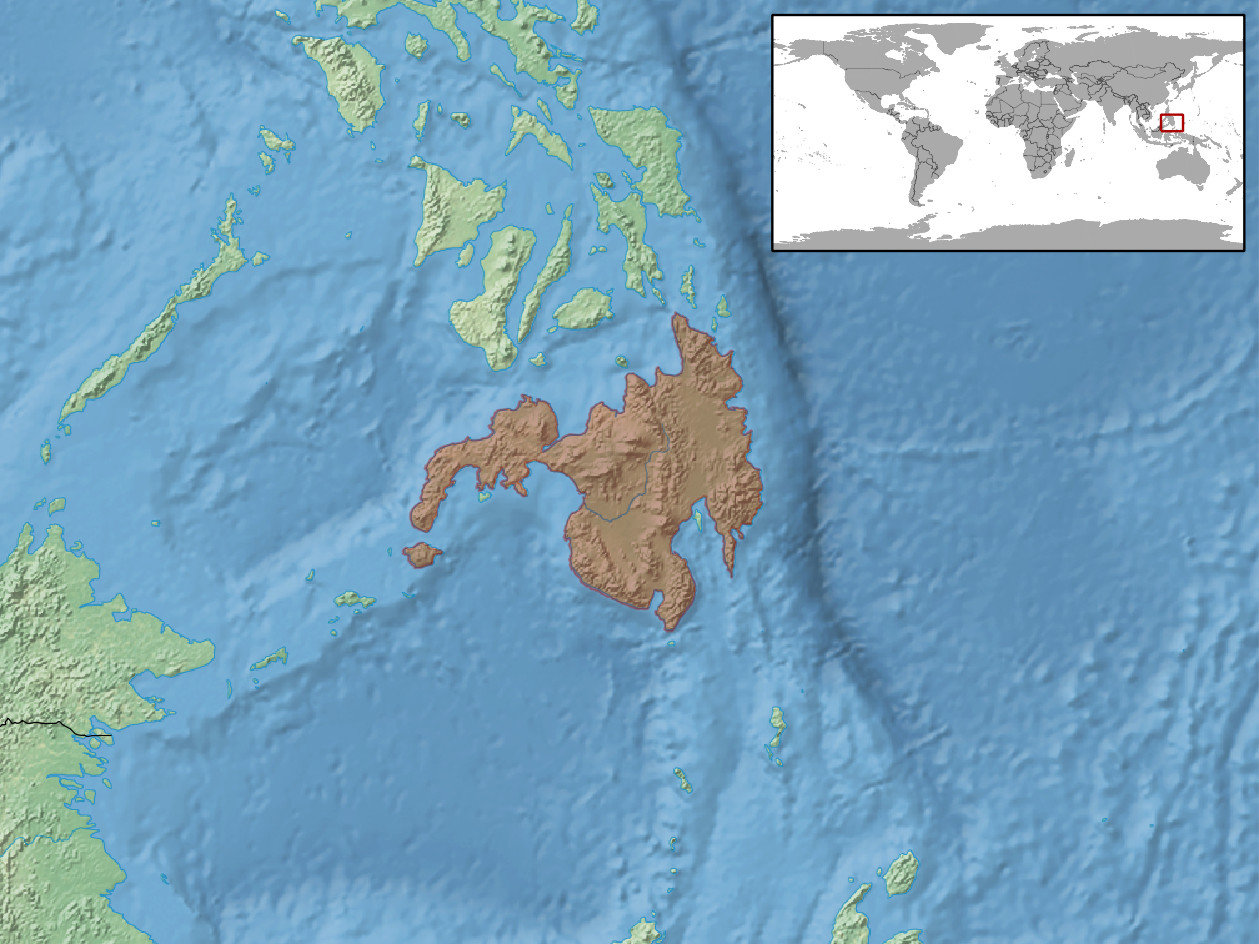
geographic distribution of Sphenomorphus atrigularis (IUCN) syn. Tytthoscincus atrigularis (RDB)

The Zamboanga sphenomorphus (Tytthoscincus atrigularis) is a species of skink. It is endemic to the Philippines.
