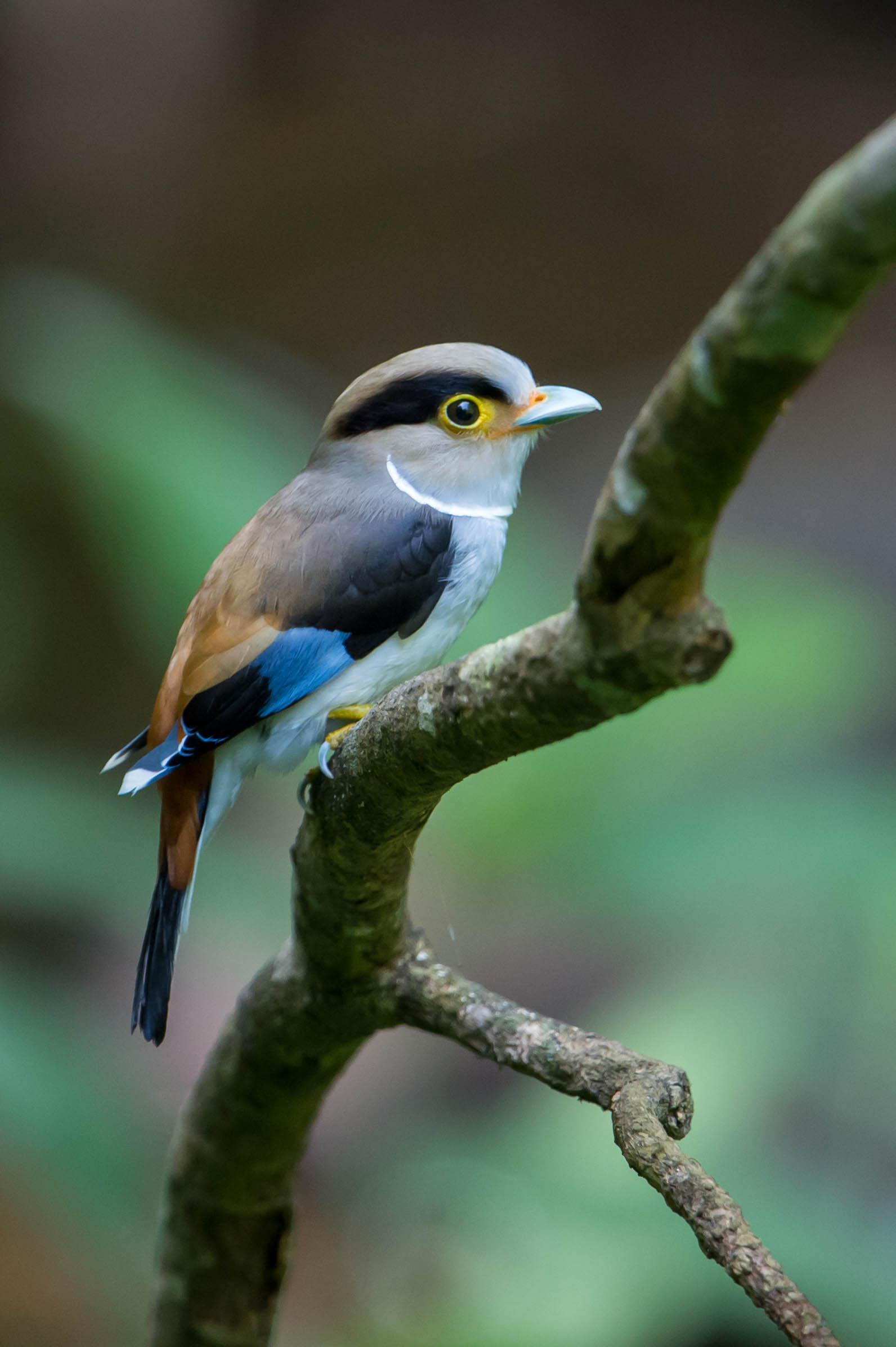
- Silver-breasted broadbill (Serilophus lunatus)

Scientific classification
- Kingdom: Animalia
- Phylum: Chordata
- Class: Aves
- Order: Passeriformes
- Family: Eurylaimidae
- Genus: Serilophus; Swainson, 1837

= Serilophus =

Genus of birds

Sarcophanops is a genus of broadbills in the family Eurylaimidae. It currently contains two species.

== Species ==
Two species are recognized:

Image	Scientific name	Common name	Distribution
	Serilophus lunatus	Silver-breasted broadbill	southeast China, Vietnam, Malay Pen. and Sumatra.
	Serilophus rubropygius	Grey-lored broadbill	northeast India to northwest Myanmar
