= Tytthoscincus temmincki =

Scientific classification
- Kingdom: Animalia
- Phylum: Chordata
- Class: Reptilia
- Order: Squamata
- Family: Scincidae
- Genus: Tytthoscincus
- Species: T. temmincki

Binomial name
- Tytthoscincus temmincki (Duméril & Bibron, 1839)

Species of lizard

Tytthoscincus temmincki in Indonesia

Tytthoscincus temmincki is a species of skink. It is endemic to Indonesia.
