= Tytthoscincus parvus =

Scientific classification
- Kingdom: Animalia
- Phylum: Chordata
- Class: Reptilia
- Order: Squamata
- Family: Scincidae
- Genus: Tytthoscincus
- Species: T. parvus

Binomial name
- Tytthoscincus parvus (Boulenger, 1897)

Species of lizard

Tytthoscincus parvus is a species of skink. It is found in Indonesia.
