= Tytthoscincus textus =

Scientific classification
- Kingdom: Animalia
- Phylum: Chordata
- Class: Reptilia
- Order: Squamata
- Family: Scincidae
- Genus: Tytthoscincus
- Species: T. textus

Binomial name
- Tytthoscincus textus (Müller, 1894)

Species of lizard

Tytthoscincus textus is a species of skink. It is endemic to Indonesia.
