= Tytthoscincus leproauricularis =

Conservation status
- Data Deficient (IUCN 3.1)

Scientific classification
- Kingdom: Animalia
- Phylum: Chordata
- Class: Reptilia
- Order: Squamata
- Family: Scincidae
- Genus: Tytthoscincus
- Species: T. leproauricularis

Binomial name
- Tytthoscincus leproauricularis Karin, Das, & Bauer, 2016

Species of lizard

Tytthoscincus leproauricularis, the scaly-eared diminutive leaf-litter skink, is a species of skink. It is endemic to Malaysia.
