= Tytthoscincus batupanggah =

Conservation status
- Data Deficient (IUCN 3.1)

Scientific classification
- Kingdom: Animalia
- Phylum: Chordata
- Class: Reptilia
- Order: Squamata
- Family: Scincidae
- Genus: Tytthoscincus
- Species: T. batupanggah

Binomial name
- Tytthoscincus batupanggah Karin, Das, & Bauer, 2016

Species of lizard

Tytthoscincus batupanggah, also known as the cursed-stone diminutive leaf-litter skink, is a species of skink. It is endemic to Borneo and only known from its type locality Gunung Penrissen in Sarawak, East Malaysia.

Tytthoscincus batupanggah is small skink measuring 27–33 mm (1.1–1.3 in) in snout–vent length. It has been found in a mixed-dipterocarp forest at 1,050 m (3,440 ft) above sea level. It is a leaf litter specialist.
