= Cnemaspis grismeri =

Scientific classification
- Kingdom: Animalia
- Phylum: Chordata
- Class: Reptilia
- Order: Squamata
- Suborder: Gekkota
- Family: Gekkonidae
- Genus: Cnemaspis
- Species: C. grismeri

Binomial name
- Cnemaspis grismeri Wood, Quah, Anuar Ms & Muin, 2013

Species of lizard

Cnemaspis grismeri, also known as the Grismer's rock gecko, is a species of geckos endemic to Malaysia.
