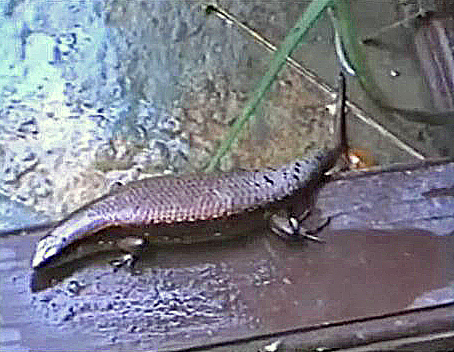
- Tytthoscincus temasekensis

Scientific classification
- Kingdom: Animalia
- Phylum: Chordata
- Class: Reptilia
- Order: Squamata
- Family: Scincidae
- Subfamily: Sphenomorphinae
- Genus: Tytthoscincus; Linkem, Diesmos & R.M. Brown, 2011

Type species
- Lygosoma hallieri Lidth De Jeude, 1905

Species
- 22 species (see text)

= Tytthoscincus =

Genus of lizards

Tytthoscincus is a genus of skinks. Originally defined to include a few species from the Philippines, the genus now includes many species from South-East Asia in general.

== Description ==
Tytthoscincus are small skinks, usually less than 45 mm (1.8 in) in snout–vent length. The temporal scales are small and of same size and shape as the lateral body scales (as opposed to being enlarged and shield-like). The digits are small.

== Species ==
The following 22 species, listed alphabetically by specific name, are recognized as being valid:

- Tytthoscincus aesculeticola (Inger, Lian, Lakim & Yambun, 2001)
- Tytthoscincus atrigularis (Stejneger, 1908) – Zamboanga sphenomorphus
- Tytthoscincus batupanggah Karin, Das & Bauer, 2016 – cursed-stone diminutive leaf-litter skink
- Tytthoscincus biparietalis (Taylor, 1918) – Sulu sphenomorphus
- Tytthoscincus bukitensis L. Grismer, 2007 – Fraser's Hill forest skink
- Tytthoscincus butleri (Boulenger, 1912) – Butler's forest skink
- Tytthoscincus hallieri (Lidth de Jeude, 1905)
- Tytthoscincus ishaki L. Grismer, 2006 – Tioman Island forest skink
- Tytthoscincus jaripendek L. Grismer, Wood, Quah, Anuar, Ngadi, Mohd-Izam & Ahmad, 2017 – Cameron Highlands forest skink
- Tytthoscincus kakikecil L. Grismer, Wood, Quah, Anuar, Ngadi, Mohd-Izam & Ahmad, 2017 – Fraser's Hill forest skink
- Tytthoscincus keciktuek L. Grismer, Wood, Ahmad, Baizul-Hafsyam, Afiq-Shuhaimi, Rizal & Quah, 2018 – Sungai Peres forest skink
- Tytthoscincus leproauricularis Karin, Das & Bauer, 2016 – scaly-eared diminutive leaf-litter skink
- Tytthoscincus martae L. Grismer, Wood, Quah, Anuar, Ngadi, Mohd-Izam & Ahmad, 2017 – Hindu Temple forest skink
- Tytthoscincus monticolus L. Grismer, Wood, Ahmad, Baizul-Hafsyam, Afiq-Shuhaimi, Rizal & Quah, 2018 – Sungai Bubu forest skink
- Tytthoscincus panchorensis L. Grismer, Muin, Wood, Anuar & Linkem, 2016 – Bukit Panchor forest skink
- Tytthoscincus parvus (Boulenger, 1897)
- Tytthoscincus perhentianensis L. Grismer, Wood & J. Grismer, 2009 – Perhentian Island forest skink
- Tytthoscincus sibuensis L. Grismer, 2006 – Sibu Island forest skink
- Tytthoscincus temasekensis L. Grismer, Wood J, Lim & Liang, 2017 – Singapore swamp skink
- Tytthoscincus temengorensis L. Grismer, Ahmad & Onn, 2009 – Temengor forest skink
- Tytthoscincus temmincki (A.M.C. Dumeril & Bibron, 1839)
- Tytthoscincus textus (F. Müller, 1894)

Nota bene: A binomial authority in parentheses indicates that the species was originally described in a genus other than Tytthoscincus.
