= Tytthoscincus biparietalis =

Conservation status
- Near Threatened (IUCN 3.1)

Scientific classification
- Kingdom: Animalia
- Phylum: Chordata
- Class: Reptilia
- Order: Squamata
- Family: Scincidae
- Genus: Tytthoscincus
- Species: T. biparietalis

Binomial name
- Tytthoscincus biparietalis (Taylor, 1918)
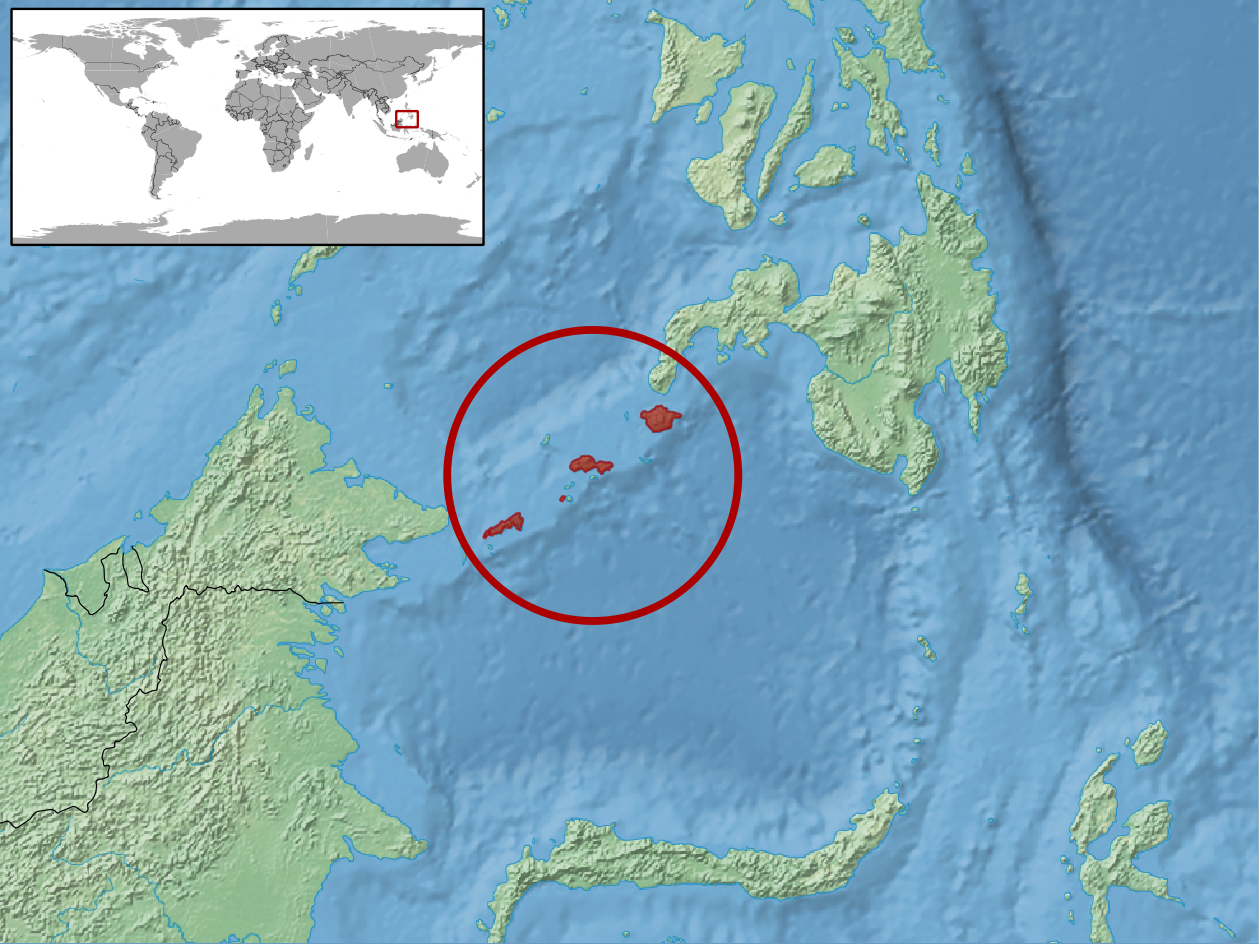

Species of lizard

Tytthoscincus biparietalis is a species of skink. It is endemic to the Philippines. It has been called the Sulu sphenomorphus as it was originally placed in the genus Sphenomorphus and the type locality is the Sulu Archipelago.
