= Tytthoscincus hallieri =

Conservation status
- Least Concern (IUCN 3.1)

Scientific classification
- Kingdom: Animalia
- Phylum: Chordata
- Class: Reptilia
- Order: Squamata
- Family: Scincidae
- Genus: Tytthoscincus
- Species: T. hallieri

Binomial name
- Tytthoscincus hallieri (Lidth de Jeude, 1905)

Synonyms
- Lygosoma hallieri Lidth de Jeude, 1905; Sphenomorphus hallieri (Lidth de Jeude, 1905)

Species of lizard

Tytthoscincus hallieri is a species of skink, a lizard in the family Scincidae. The species is native to Southeast Asia.

== Etymology ==
The specific name, hallieri, is in honor of German botanist Johann Gottfried "Hans" Hallier.

== Geographic range ==
T. hallieri is found in Indonesia and Malaysia.

== Habitat ==
The preferred natural habitat of T. hallieri is forest, at altitudes of 50–850 m (160–2,790 ft).

== Reproduction ==
T. hallieri is oviparous.
