= Tytthoscincus bukitensis =

Conservation status
- Near Threatened (IUCN 3.1)

Scientific classification
- Kingdom: Animalia
- Phylum: Chordata
- Class: Reptilia
- Order: Squamata
- Family: Scincidae
- Genus: Tytthoscincus
- Species: T. bukitensis

Binomial name
- Tytthoscincus bukitensis (Grismer, 2007)

Synonyms
- Sphenomorphus bukitensis Grismer, 2007

Species of lizard

Tytthoscincus bukitensis, also known as the Fraser's Hill forest skink , is a species of skink. It is endemic to Peninsular Malaysia.

Tytthoscincus bukitensis is a fossorial species inhabiting hill dipterocarp and lower montane forests at elevations of 1,046–1,239 m (3,432–4,065 ft) above sea level. Adult females measure 41–4 mm (1.6–0.2 in) in snout–vent length.
