= Lycodon butleri =

Conservation status
- Least Concern (IUCN 3.1)

Scientific classification
- Kingdom: Animalia
- Phylum: Chordata
- Class: Reptilia
- Order: Squamata
- Suborder: Serpentes
- Family: Colubridae
- Genus: Lycodon
- Species: L. butleri

Binomial name
- Lycodon butleri Boulenger, 1900

Species of snake

Lycodon butleri, also known commonly as Butler's wolf snake, is a species of snake in the family Colubridae. The species is native to southern Thailand and peninsular Malaysia.

== Etymology ==
Lycodon butleri is named after British zoologist Arthur Lennox Butler (1873–1939), the Curator of the Selangor State Museum.

== Reproduction ==
Lycodon butleri is oviparous (egg-laying).

== Phylogeny ==
Lycodon butleri is a member of the genus Lycodon, a genus of snakes commonly known as wolf snakes. The genus belongs to the snake family Colubridae, the largest snake family, with member species being found on every continent except Antarctica.

== Habitat and ecology ==
L. butleri is a terrestrial species, found in montane forests at elevations between 1,100 and 1,500 m (3,600 and 4,900 ft) above sea-level. It is partly arboreal.

== Geographic range ==
L. butleri has been recorded from the province of Krabi in southern Thailand, as well as from peninsular Malaysia.

== Conservation status ==
The International Union for Conservation of Nature (IUCN) considers Lycodon butleri to be a species of "Least Concern", based on a 2011 survey. The species faces no major threats, and no population trends are known. No species-specific conservation policies exist for this snake, but its range includes several protected areas.
