= Arthur Lennox Butler =

Arthur Lennox Butler (22 February 1873 – 29 December 1939) was a British naturalist. Born in Karachi, he became a curator of a natural history museum in Kuala Lumpur, Malaysia. He later became the superintendent of a game preserve in Sudan before returning to England. He is commemorated in the scientific names of four species of reptile, a bird, and an amphibian.

== Early life and education ==
Butler was born on 22 February 1873 in Karachi, British India. His father was the British ornithologist Edward Arthur Butler and his mother was Clara Francis Butler. Butler attended Fauconberg School in Beccles. In 1891 at the age of eighteen, Butler traveled to Ceylon (now Sri Lanka) to become a tea-planter, which he abandoned to become a scientific collector.

== Career ==
Butler became a scientific collector after moving to Ceylon, collecting specimens for the Marsden and Tring museums. In 1898, Butler was appointed curator at the State Museum at Kuala Lumpur in Malaysia. In 1899, he was elected as a member of the British Ornithologists' Union. Beginning in 1901, he was the superintendent of game preservation in Anglo-Egyptian Sudan, a position he held until 1915. In 1921, he became a member of the British Ornithologists' Club.

== Personal life ==
In 1908, Butler married his cousin, Rose Boughton-Leigh. The couple had no children.

== Later life and death ==
In 1915 Butler returned to England, living in St. Leonard's Park near Horsham for the rest of his life. The last several years of his life were spent in poor health, and he was unable to attend any meetings of the British Ornithologists' Club from 1932 onward. Butler died on 29 December 1939 at age 66.

== Legacy and honors ==
The scientific name of the Nicobar sparrowhawk (Accipiter butleri) commemorates Butler, as do the scientific names of four species of reptiles (Gehyra butleri, Lycodon butleri, Chilorhinophis butleri, and Tytthoscincus butleri) and an amphibian (Microhyla butleri). Gehyra butleri is now included as a synonym of Gehyra mutilata by some. In 1915, he was awarded the Order of the Nile.
