= Tytthoscincus aesculeticola =

Conservation status
- Least Concern (IUCN 3.1)

Scientific classification
- Kingdom: Animalia
- Phylum: Chordata
- Class: Reptilia
- Order: Squamata
- Family: Scincidae
- Genus: Tytthoscincus
- Species: T. aesculeticola

Binomial name
- Tytthoscincus aesculeticola (Inger, Lian, Lakim & Yambun, 2001)

Synonyms
- Sphenomorphus aesculeticola Inger, Lian, Lakin & Yambun, 2001

Species of lizard

Tytthoscincus aesculeticola is a species of skink. It is endemic to Borneo and is currently known from Sarawak and Sabah (East Malaysia).

Tytthoscincus aesculeticola is a small skink with a maximum size of 42 mm (1.7 in) in snout–vent length. It occurs in montane environments below the surface of soil, dead leaves, rocks, and logs as well as on the surface of soil and logs at elevations of 1,350–1,700 m (4,430–5,580 ft) above sea level.
