= Hugo Steiner =

Swiss physician

Hugo Steiner is a Swiss citizen who graduated from the University of Zurich as a physician specialising in endocrinology. He worked for several years as the leader of a research group in experimental endocrinology for Hoffmann-La Roche Ltd in Basel, Switzerland. He has also done research work in Sweden, Italy, France and Germany. In 1965, Steiner served as team leader of an International Red Cross mission in North Yemen. From 1976 to 1998 he had a private medical practice, specialising in endocrinology and diabetes, in Basel.

Between 1991 and 2002, Steiner and his wife spent a month each year in Borneo, visiting the Malaysian states of Sabah and Sarawak. In 2002, Steiner published the book Borneo: Its Highlands and Lowlands with their Pitcher Plants. They also made frequent visits to Morocco and Tunisia, which resulted in a book on Roman cities in Northern Africa and another about the Roman capital of Volubilis in central Morocco.
