= Tenggol Island bent-toed gecko =

Conservation status
- Least Concern (IUCN 3.1)

Scientific classification
- Kingdom: Animalia
- Phylum: Chordata
- Class: Reptilia
- Order: Squamata
- Suborder: Gekkota
- Family: Gekkonidae
- Genus: Cyrtodactylus
- Species: C. leegrismeri

Binomial name
- Cyrtodactylus leegrismeri Chan & Ahmad, 2010

Species of lizard

The Tenggol Island bent-toed gecko (Cyrtodactylus leegrismeri) is a species of lizard in the family Gekkonidae. The species is endemic to Tenggol Island in Malaysia.

== Etymology ==
The specific name, leegrismeri, is in honor of American herpetologist Larry Lee Grismer.

== Habitat ==
The preferred natural habitats of C. leegrismeri are forest and rocky areas, at altitudes of 9–80 m (30–262 ft).

== Description ==
C. leegrismeri may attain a snout-to-vent length (SVL) of 9.2 cm (3.6 in).

== Behavior ==
C. leegrismeri is nocturnal, terrestrial, and scansorial.

== Reproduction ==
C. leegrismeri is oviparous. Clutch size is two eggs.
