= Perry Lee Wood Jr. =

American herpetologist (born 1981)

Perry Lee Wood, Jr.
- Born: October 25, 1981 (age 44)
- Education: La Sierra University; Villanova University; Brigham Young University
- Known for: Research on the evolutionary biology and systematics of Southeast Asian reptiles and amphibians
- Scientific career
- Fields: Herpetology
- Workplaces: La Sierra University; Villanova University; Brigham Young University; University of Kansas; Auburn University
- Thesis: Phylogenetics, Biogeography, and Patterns of Diversification of Geckos across the Sunda Shelf with an Emphasis on the Genus Cnemaspis (Strauch, 1887) (2017)
- Doctoral advisor: Jack W. Sites, Jr.
- Website: perryleewoodjr.com

Perry Lee Wood, Jr. (born October 25, 1981) is an American herpetologist. His research focuses on the herpetofauna of Southeast Asia.

== Biography ==
From 2001 to 2006, Wood served as research and curatorial assistant for the herpetological collection at La Sierra University in Riverside, California. From 2003 to 2005, he was a lecturer and teaching assistant in Tropical Field Biology at La Sierra University. In 2004, he collaborated with Larry Lee Grismer and Jesse Leland Grismer on the Animal Planet documentary Reptile Kings: Search for the Lost Viper. In 2007, Wood earned his Bachelor of Science degree in biological sciences from La Sierra University.

From 2008 to 2009, he was a lecturer in biology and herpetology at Villanova University. In 2011, he completed his Master of Science at Villanova University under the supervision of Todd R. Jackman and Aaron M. Bauer, with a thesis titled Systematics, biogeography, taxonomy and delimiting species complexes in the Southeast Asian lizard genus Acanthosaura Gray, 1831 inferred from mitochondrial and fast-evolving protein coding nuclear loci. From 2012 to 2015, he lectured in evolutionary biology at Brigham Young University. In 2017, he received his Ph.D. from Brigham Young University with the dissertation Phylogenetics, Biogeography, and Patterns of Diversification of Geckos across the Sunda Shelf with an Emphasis on the Genus Cnemaspis (Strauch, 1887), supervised by Jack W. Sites Jr.

From January 2017 to August 2018, Wood was a postdoctoral researcher under Rafe M. Brown at the University of Kansas Biodiversity Institute, working on the project Comparative phylogenomics of the Philippines. Since August 2018, he has been a research associate at the Auburn University project Generalizing Bayesian phylogenetics to infer shared evolutionary events, led by Jamie R. Oaks.

His research primarily focuses on evolutionary biology in Southeast Asia. He investigates cryptic species of amphibians and reptiles, evolutionary patterns and processes, and the systematics and historical biogeography of the Sunda Islands region. His master’s thesis focused on species delimitation and historical biogeography of the Southeast Asian agamid genus Acanthosaura. His doctoral work centered on collecting morphological and molecular data to address questions about ground adaptation, convergent evolution, and adaptive radiation in the Southeast Asian gecko genus Cnemaspis. His research projects include comparative phylogeography of the herpetofauna of the Malay Peninsula, across the Isthmus of Kra and the Kangar–Pattani line, as well as testing hypotheses on phylogeography, biogeography, and speciation in Southeast Asia using genomic data. He also works on evolutionary systematics, species delimitation, and historical biogeography of geckos and agamids in Southeast Asia, as well as theoretical systematics, phylogenomics, and Bayesian coalescent methods for delineating species complexes and estimating co-divergence.

Wood’s fieldwork has taken him to the Malay Peninsula, Thailand, Indonesia, Myanmar, Peru, and Cambodia.

He has contributed to the description of more than 130 species of geckos and skinks, eight frog species, and one species of caudate amphibian.

Wood is a member of the International Biogeography Society, the American Society of Ichthyologists and Herpetologists, the Herpetologists’ League, the Society for the Study of Amphibians and Reptiles, the Society for the Study of Evolution, and the Society of Systematic Biologists.
