= Larry Lee Grismer =

American herpetologist

- Born: November 19, 1955 (age 70)
- Education: San Diego State University; Loma Linda University
- Known for: Research on Southeast Asian and Baja California herpetofauna; descriptions of new reptile and amphibian species
- Scientific career
- Fields: Herpetology
- Workplaces: La Sierra University; San Diego Natural History Museum
- Thesis: The evolutionary and ecological biogeography of the herpetofauna of Baja California and the Sea of Cortes, Mexico (1994)
- Author abbrev. (zoology): Grismer

Larry Lee Grismer (born November 19, 1955), often cited as L. Lee Grismer or simply Lee Grismer, is an American herpetologist. He is a research associate at the San Diego Natural History Museum and a professor of biology at La Sierra University in California. His research focuses on the herpetofauna of Southeast Asia and Baja California.

== Biography ==
Grismer earned his Bachelor of Science degree in biology from San Diego State University in 1980, followed by a Master of Science in 1986 from the same institution. In 1994, he received his Ph.D. from Loma Linda University with a dissertation titled The evolutionary and ecological biogeography of the herpetofauna of Baja California and the Sea of Cortes, Mexico. He subsequently joined the faculty at La Sierra University, where he has served as professor of biology since 2008 and was chair of the biology department until 2013.

Beginning in the 1980s, Grismer studied reptiles and amphibians in California and for nearly 25 years in Baja California, resulting in his 2002 publication Amphibians and Reptiles of Baja California, Including Its Pacific Islands, and the Islands in the Sea of Corte’s. Since 2002, he has conducted extensive research in Malaysia, Myanmar, Thailand, Cambodia, Laos, China, Vietnam, and Indonesia, focusing on evolutionary biology, biogeography, and systematics of geckos, skinks, and snakes. His primary interest lies in cryptic species inhabiting karst regions.

Working in collaboration with other herpetologists, including his son Jesse Leland Grismer (born 1983), Indraneil Das, Ngô Văn Trí, Perry L. Wood Jr., and Aaron M. Bauer, he has described over 150 species of reptiles and around 23 new amphibian species, such as the toads Ansonia smeagol and Ingerophrynus gollum, both named after the character Gollum (Sméagol) from J. R. R. Tolkien’s works The Hobbit and The Lord of the Rings.

In 2011, the Frankfurt-based publisher Chimaira released two of his major works: Lizards of Peninsular Malaysia, Singapore, and Their Adjacent Archipelagos and Amphibians and Reptiles of the Seribuat Archipelago (Peninsular Malaysia) – A Field Guide.

Grismer is a member of the American Society of Ichthyologists and Herpetologists.

In 2004, he appeared with his son in the Animal Planet documentary Reptile Kings: Search for the Lost Viper, which follows the search for the pit viper Popeia buniana on the Malaysian island of Pulau Tioman.

== Eponymous taxa ==
Several species have been named in his honor, including:

- Crotaphytus grismeri (1994)
- Cyrtodactylus grismeri (2008)
- Dendrelaphis grismeri (2008)
- Cyrtodactylus leegrismeri (2010)
- Cnemaspis grismeri (2013)

== Selected publications ==
- Grismer, Larry Lee. (2002). Amphibians and Reptiles of Baja California, Including Its Pacific Islands, and the Islands in the Sea of Corte’s.
- Grismer, Larry Lee. (2011). Lizards of Peninsular Malaysia, Singapore, and Their Adjacent Archipelagos. Chimaira, Frankfurt am Main.
- Grismer, Larry Lee. (2011). Amphibians and Reptiles of the Seribuat Archipelago (Peninsular Malaysia) – A Field Guide. Chimaira, Frankfurt am Main.
