= Cyrtodactylus agusanensis =

Conservation status
- Least Concern (IUCN 3.1)

Scientific classification
- Kingdom: Animalia
- Phylum: Chordata
- Class: Reptilia
- Order: Squamata
- Suborder: Gekkota
- Family: Gekkonidae
- Genus: Cyrtodactylus
- Species: C. agusanensis

Binomial name
- Cyrtodactylus agusanensis (Taylor 1915)
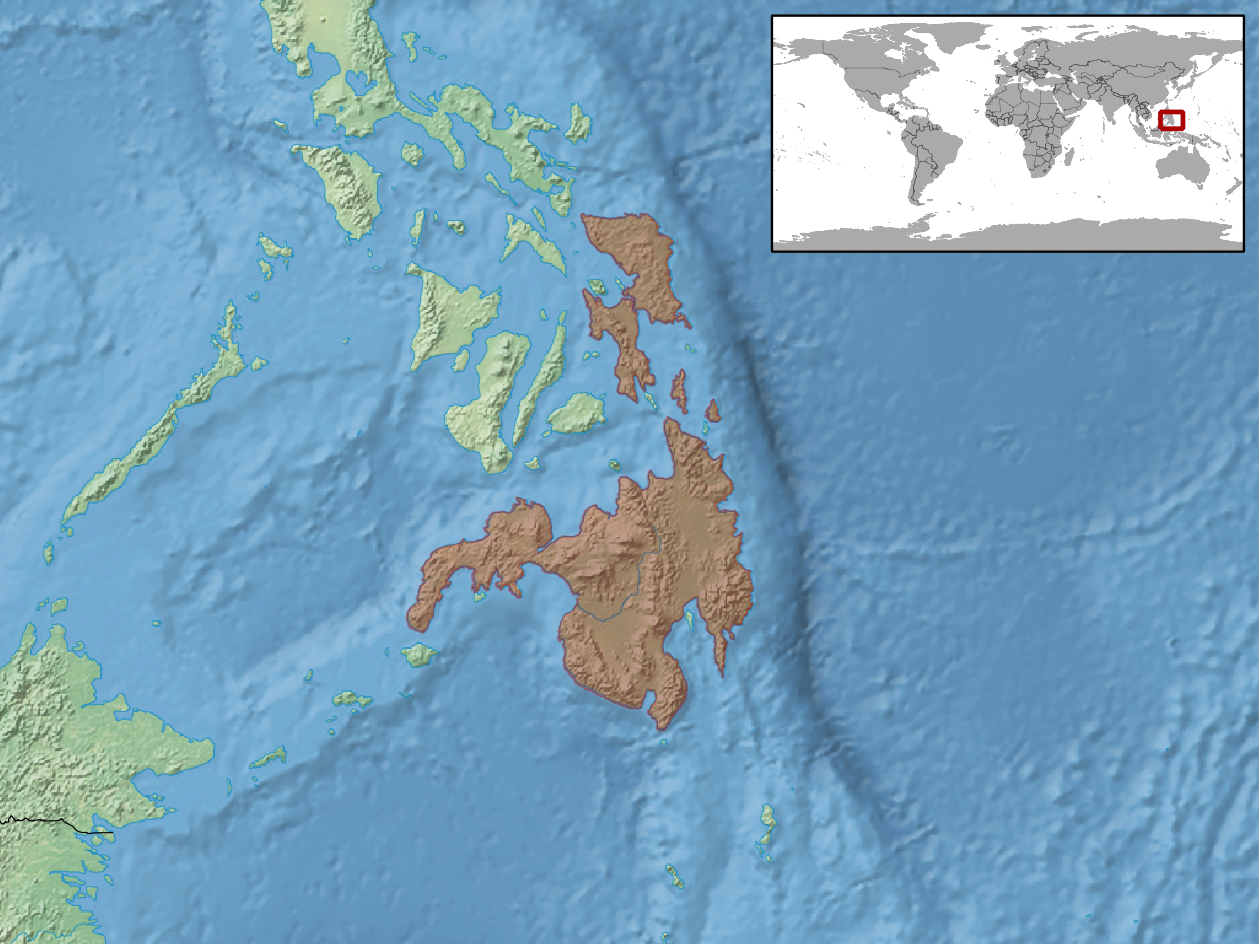

Synonyms
- Gymnodactylus agusanensis

Species of lizard

Cyrtodactylus agusanensis is a species of gecko endemic to the southern Philippines. It is sometimes considered conspecific with Cyrtodactylus mamanwa.
