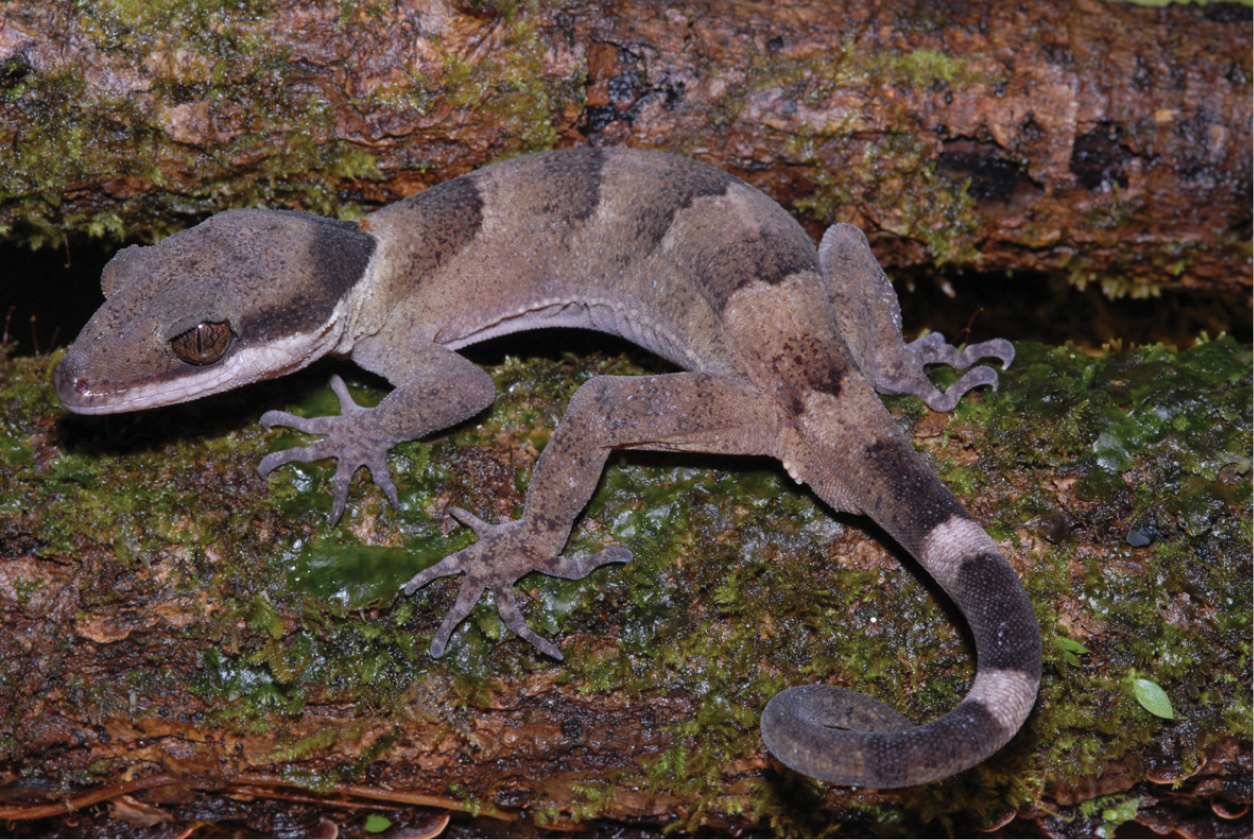

Conservation status
- Least Concern (IUCN 3.1)

Scientific classification
- Kingdom: Animalia
- Phylum: Chordata
- Class: Reptilia
- Order: Squamata
- Suborder: Gekkota
- Family: Gekkonidae
- Genus: Cyrtodactylus
- Species: C. novaeguineae

Binomial name
- Cyrtodactylus novaeguineae (Schlegel, 1837)

Synonyms
- Gymnodactylus novaeguineae; Gymnodactylus novae-guineae; Gonydactylus novaeguineae

= Cyrtodactylus novaeguineae =

Species of lizard

Cyrtodactylus novaeguineae is a species of gecko that is endemic to Papua New Guinea. It is the largest member in its genus. Three mitochondrial lineages, "south," "north," and "north-1," were identified in 2016.
