= Luperosaurus yasumai =

Conservation status
- Data Deficient (IUCN 3.1)

Scientific classification
- Kingdom: Animalia
- Phylum: Chordata
- Class: Reptilia
- Order: Squamata
- Suborder: Gekkota
- Family: Gekkonidae
- Genus: Luperosaurus
- Species: L. yasumai

Binomial name
- Luperosaurus yasumai Ota, Sengoku & Hikida, 1996

Species of lizard

Luperosaurus yasumai is a species of gecko, a lizard in the family Gekkonidae. The species is endemic to Indonesian Borneo.

== Etymology ==
The specific name, yasumai, is in honor of Shigeki Yasuma, a Japanese biologist who has contributed to research and conservation of wildlife in Borneo.

== Habitat ==
The preferred natural habitat of L. yasumai is forest.

== Description ==
L. yasumai shares a close resemblance to Luperosaurus joloensis and Luperosaurus palawanensis. It has a few distinctions from its relatives in that it has fewer scansors on its seventh toe and it has a more depressed tail. Adults may attain a snout-to-vent length of about 4 cm (1.6 in).

== Reproduction ==
L. yasumai is oviparous.
