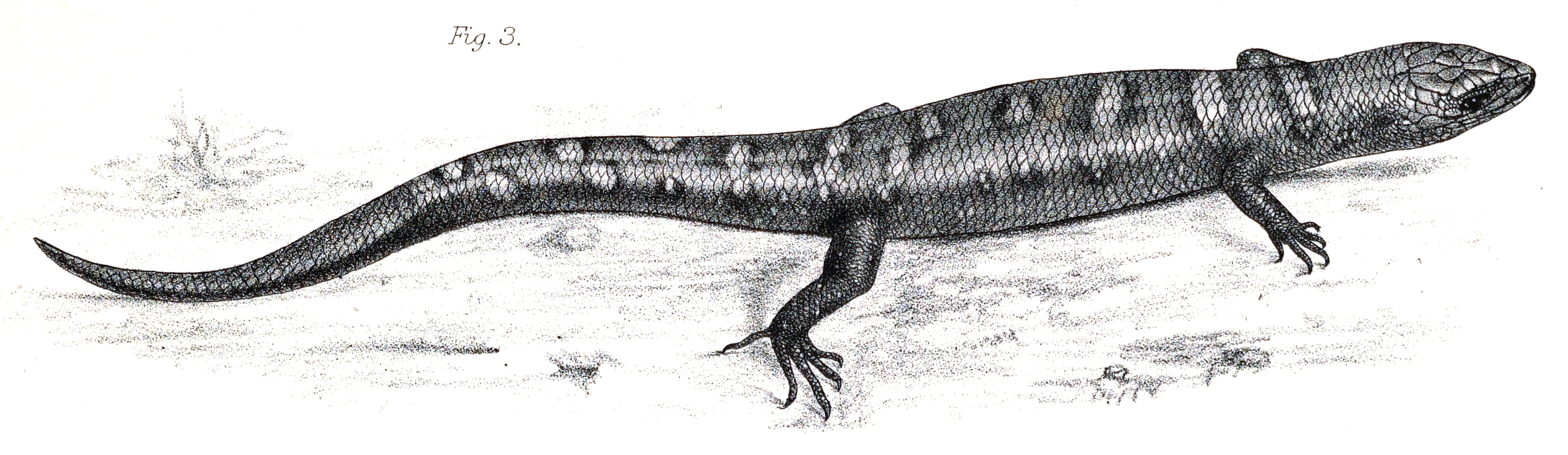
- T. berdmorei

Scientific classification
- Kingdom: Animalia
- Phylum: Chordata
- Class: Reptilia
- Order: Squamata
- Family: Scincidae
- Subfamily: Sphenomorphinae
- Genus: Tropidophorus; A.M.C. Duméril & Bibron, 1839

Type species
- T. cocincinensis

Species
- See text.

= Tropidophorus =

Genus of lizards

Tropidophorus is a genus of semiaquatic lizards in the skink family (Scincidae), found in Indochina, Borneo, Sulawesi, and the Philippines. They are sometimes known as water skinks or waterside skinks.

== Species ==
The following 29 species are recognized:

- Tropidophorus assamensis Annandale, 1912 – north-eastern water skink
- Tropidophorus baconi Hikida, Riyanto & Ota, 2003
- Tropidophorus baviensis Bourret, 1939 – Bavi water skink, Bavay's keeled skink
- Tropidophorus beccarii W. Peters, 1871 – Beccari's keeled skink
- Tropidophorus berdmorei (Blyth, 1853) – Berdmore's water skink
- Tropidophorus boehmei T.Q. Nguyen et al., 2010 – Boehme's water skink
- Tropidophorus brookei (Gray, 1845) – Brook's keeled skink
- Tropidophorus cocincinensis A.M.C. Duméril & Bibron, 1839 – Cochinchinese water skink
- Tropidophorus davaoensis Bacon, 1980 – Davao waterside skink
- Tropidophorus grayi Günther, 1861 – Gray's water skink, spiny waterside skink, Gray's keeled skink
- Tropidophorus guangxiensis Y. Wen, 1992
- Tropidophorus hainanus M.A. Smith, 1923 – Hainan water skink
- Tropidophorus hangnam Chuaynkern et al., 2005
- Tropidophorus iniquus Lidth de Jeude, 1905
- Tropidophorus kouzhitongi Wang, Li, Deepak, Stuart & Che, 2025 – Kou's water skink
- Tropidophorus laotus M.A. Smith, 1923 – Laotian water skink, Laotian keeled skink
- Tropidophorus latiscutatus Hikida et al., 2002
- Tropidophorus matsuii Hikida et al., 2002
- Tropidophorus microlepis Günther, 1861 – small-scaled water skink
- Tropidophorus micropus Lidth de Jeude, 1905
- Tropidophorus misaminius Stejneger, 1908 – Misamis waterside skink
- Tropidophorus mocquardii Boulenger, 1894 – Mocquard's keeled skink
- Tropidophorus murphyi Hikida et al., 2002 – Murphy's water skink
- Tropidophorus noggei T. Ziegler et al., 2005 – Nogge's water skink
- Tropidophorus partelloi Stejneger, 1910 – Partello's waterside skink
- Tropidophorus perplexus Barbour, 1921
- Tropidophorus robinsoni M.A. Smith, 1919 – Robinson's water skink, Robinson's keeled skink
- Tropidophorus sebi Pui, Karin, Bauer & Das, 2017 – Baleh water skink
- Tropidophorus sinicus Boettger, 1886 – Chinese water skink
- Tropidophorus thai M.A. Smith, 1919 – Thai water skink, Thai stream skink

Nota bene: A binomial authority in parentheses indicates that the species was originally described in a genus other than Tropidophorus.
