= Sabah scaly-toed gecko =

Scientific classification
- Kingdom: Animalia
- Phylum: Chordata
- Class: Reptilia
- Order: Squamata
- Suborder: Gekkota
- Family: Gekkonidae
- Genus: Lepidodactylus
- Species: L. ranauensis

Binomial name
- Lepidodactylus ranauensis Ota & Hikida, 1988

Species of lizard

The Sabah scaly-toed gecko (Lepidodactylus ranauensis) is a species of gecko. It is endemic to Sabah (Borneo).
