= Tropidophorus latiscutatus =

Conservation status
- Data Deficient (IUCN 3.1)

Scientific classification
- Kingdom: Animalia
- Phylum: Chordata
- Class: Reptilia
- Order: Squamata
- Family: Scincidae
- Genus: Tropidophorus
- Species: T. latiscutatus

Binomial name
- Tropidophorus latiscutatus Hikida, Orlov, Nabhitabhata, & Ota, 2002

Species of lizard

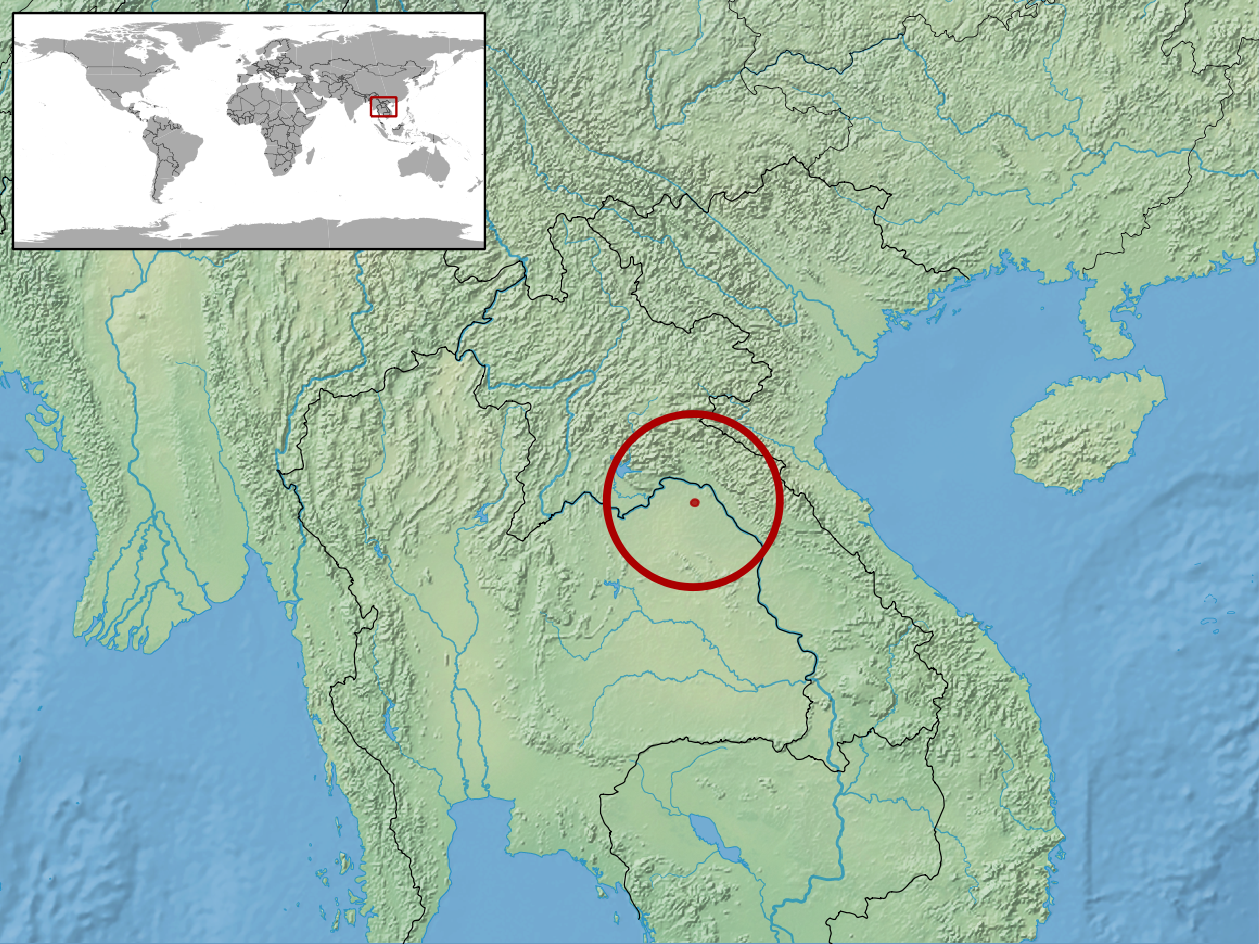
Geographic distribution of Tropidophorus latiscutatus.

Tropidophorus latiscutatus is a species of skink found in Thailand.
