= Tropidophorus baconi =

Scientific classification
- Kingdom: Animalia
- Phylum: Chordata
- Class: Reptilia
- Order: Squamata
- Family: Scincidae
- Genus: Tropidophorus
- Species: T. baconi

Binomial name
- Tropidophorus baconi Hikida, Riyanto & Ota, 2003

Species of lizard

Tropidophorus baconi, also known commonly as Bacon's water skink or Bacon's waterside skink, is a species of lizard in the subfamily Sphenomorphinae of the family Scincidae. The species is endemic to Sulawesi (Indonesia).

== Etymology ==
The specific name, baconi, is in honor of American herpetologist James Patterson Bacon, Jr. (1940–1986).

== Reproduction ==
T. baconi is viviparous.
