= Gekko vertebralis =

Conservation status
- Least Concern (IUCN 3.1)

Scientific classification
- Kingdom: Animalia
- Phylum: Chordata
- Class: Reptilia
- Order: Squamata
- Suborder: Gekkota
- Family: Gekkonidae
- Genus: Gekko
- Species: G. vertebralis

Binomial name
- Gekko vertebralis Toda, Sengoku, Hikida & Ota, 2008

Species of lizard

Gekko vertebralis is a species of gecko. It is endemic to the Ryukyu Islands. It was first described in 2008 by Toda, Sengoku, Hikida and Ota.
