= Hikida's bow-fingered gecko =

Conservation status
- Least Concern (IUCN 3.1)

Scientific classification
- Kingdom: Animalia
- Phylum: Chordata
- Class: Reptilia
- Order: Squamata
- Suborder: Gekkota
- Family: Gekkonidae
- Genus: Cyrtodactylus
- Species: C. matsuii

Binomial name
- Cyrtodactylus matsuii Hikida, 1990

Synonyms
- Cyrtodactylus matsumii Hikida, 1990; Gonydactylus matsuii — Tan, 1993; Cyrtodactylus matsuii — Rösler, 2000

Species of lizard

Hikida's bow-fingered gecko (Cyrtodactylus matsuii), also known commonly as Matsui's bent-toed gecko and the Sabah mountain bent-toed gecko, is a species of lizard in the family Gekkonidae. The species is endemic to the island of Borneo.

== Etymology ==
The specific name, matsuii, is in honor of Japanese herpetologist Masafumi Matsui.

== Geographic distribution ==
On Borneo, Cyrtodactylus matsuii is found in the Malaysian state of Sabah.

== Habitat ==
The preferred habitat of Cyrtodactylus matsuii is montane forests at altitudes of 900–1,600 m (3,000–5,200 ft).

== Description ==
Cyrtodactylus matsuii is heavy-bodied and may attain a snout-to-vent length (SVL) of 10.5 cm (4.1 in). Dorsally, it has a pattern of irregular dark brown crossbars on a ground color which is yellowish tan. Ventrally, it is uniformly pale gray or pale brown.

== Diet ==
Cyrtodactylus matsuii preys on arthropods, especially insects.

== Reproduction ==
Cyrtodactylus matsuii is oviparous. However, details of its reproductive habits are unrecorded.
