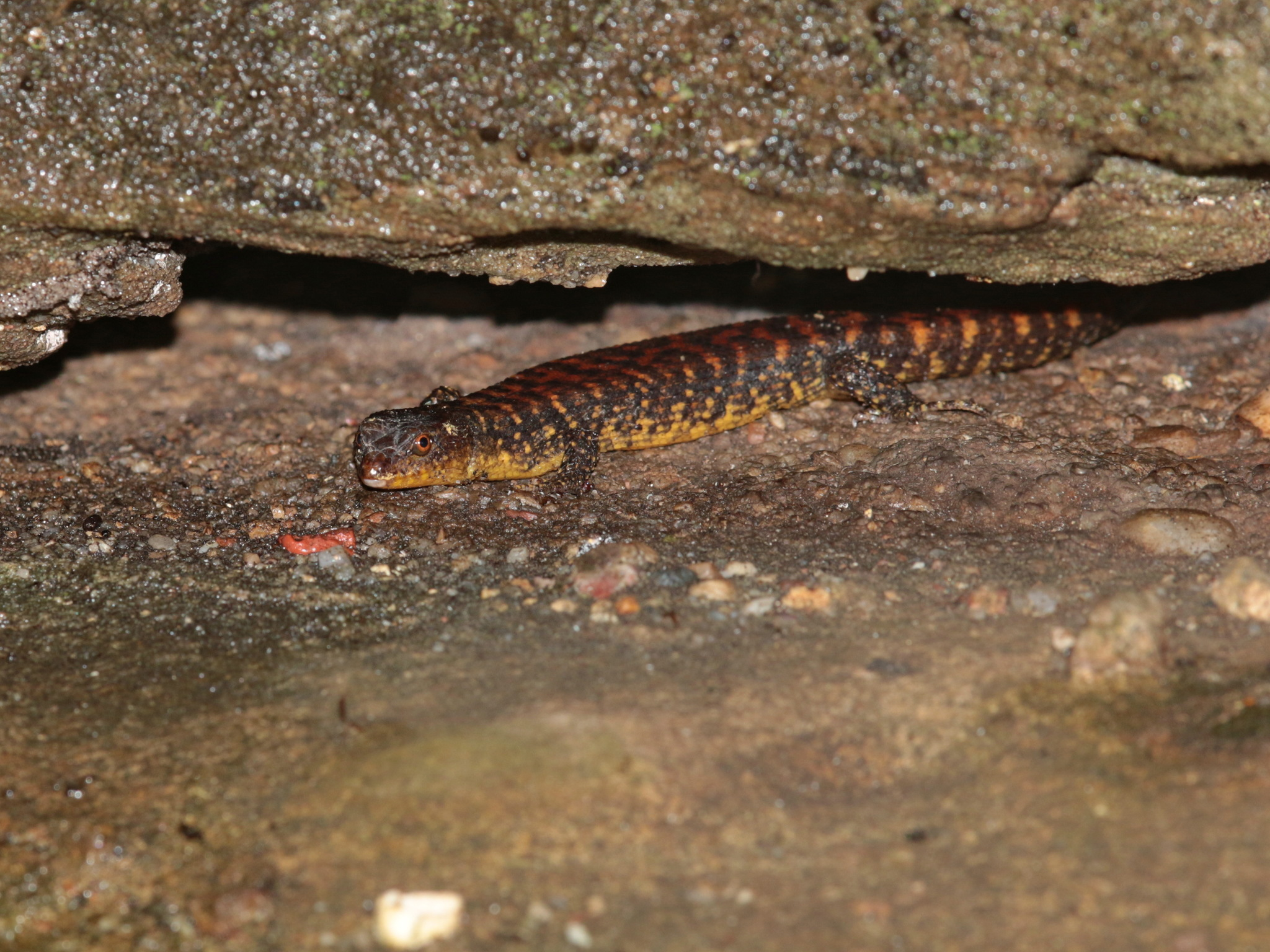

Conservation status
- Data Deficient (IUCN 3.1)

Scientific classification
- Kingdom: Animalia
- Phylum: Chordata
- Class: Reptilia
- Order: Squamata
- Family: Scincidae
- Genus: Tropidophorus
- Species: T. matsuii

Binomial name
- Tropidophorus matsuii Hikida, Orlov, Nabhitabhata & Ota, 2002

= Tropidophorus matsuii =

Species of lizard

Tropidophorus matsuii, also known commonly as Matsui's water skink, is a species of lizard in the subfamily Sphenomorphinae of the family Scincidae. The species is endemic to Thailand.

== Etymology ==
The specific name, matsuii, is in honor of Japanese herpetologist Masafumi Matsui.

== Geographic distribution ==
Tropidophorus matsuii is found in northeastern Thailand, in Roi Et province.

== Habitat ==
The preferred natural habitats of Tropidophorus matsuii are forest and freshwater wetlands, at altitudes of approximately 350 m (1,150 ft).

== Behavior ==
Tropidophorus matsuii is semiaquatic.

== Reproduction ==
Tropidophorus matsuii is ovoviviparous.
