= Cyrtodactylus hikidai =

Scientific classification
- Kingdom: Animalia
- Phylum: Chordata
- Class: Reptilia
- Order: Squamata
- Suborder: Gekkota
- Family: Gekkonidae
- Genus: Cyrtodactylus
- Species: C. hikidai

Binomial name
- Cyrtodactylus hikidai Riyanto, 2012

Species of gecko endemic to Indonesia

Cyrtodactylus hikidai is a species of gecko, a lizard in the family Gekkonidae. The species is endemic to the island of Natuna Besar in Indonesia.

== Etymology ==
The specific name, hikidai, is in honor of Japanese herpetologist Tsutomu Hikida.

== Description ==
Large for its genus, C. hikidai may attain a snout-to-vent length (SVL) of 10.2 cm (4.0 in).
