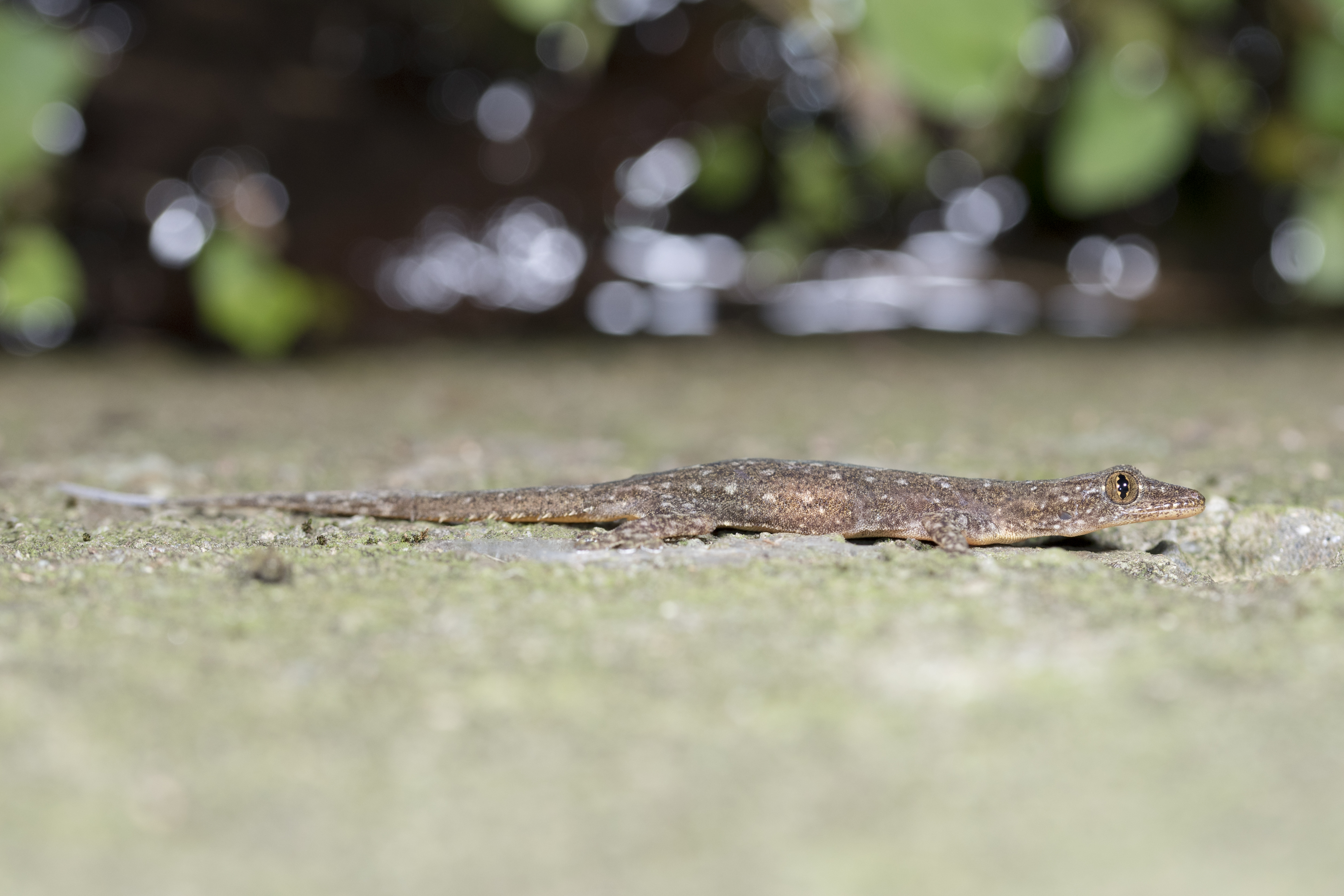

Conservation status
- Least Concern (IUCN 3.1)

Scientific classification
- Kingdom: Animalia
- Phylum: Chordata
- Class: Reptilia
- Order: Squamata
- Suborder: Gekkota
- Family: Gekkonidae
- Genus: Hemidactylus
- Species: H. stejnegeri

Binomial name
- Hemidactylus stejnegeri Ota & Hikida, 1989

= Stejneger's leaf-toed gecko =

Species of lizard

Stejneger's leaf-toed gecko (Hemidactylus stejnegeri) is a species of lizard in the family Gekkonidae. The species is native to Southeast Asia.

== Etymology ==
The specific name, stejnegeri, is in honour of Norwegian-American herpetologist Leonhard Stejneger.

== Geographic range ==
H. stejnegeri is found in the Philippines, Taiwan, and Vietnam.

== Habitat ==
The preferred habitat of H. stejnegeri is forest, at altitudes from sea level to 1,500 m (4,900 ft).

== Reproduction ==
H. stejnegeri is an oviparous, triploid, parthenogenetic species.
