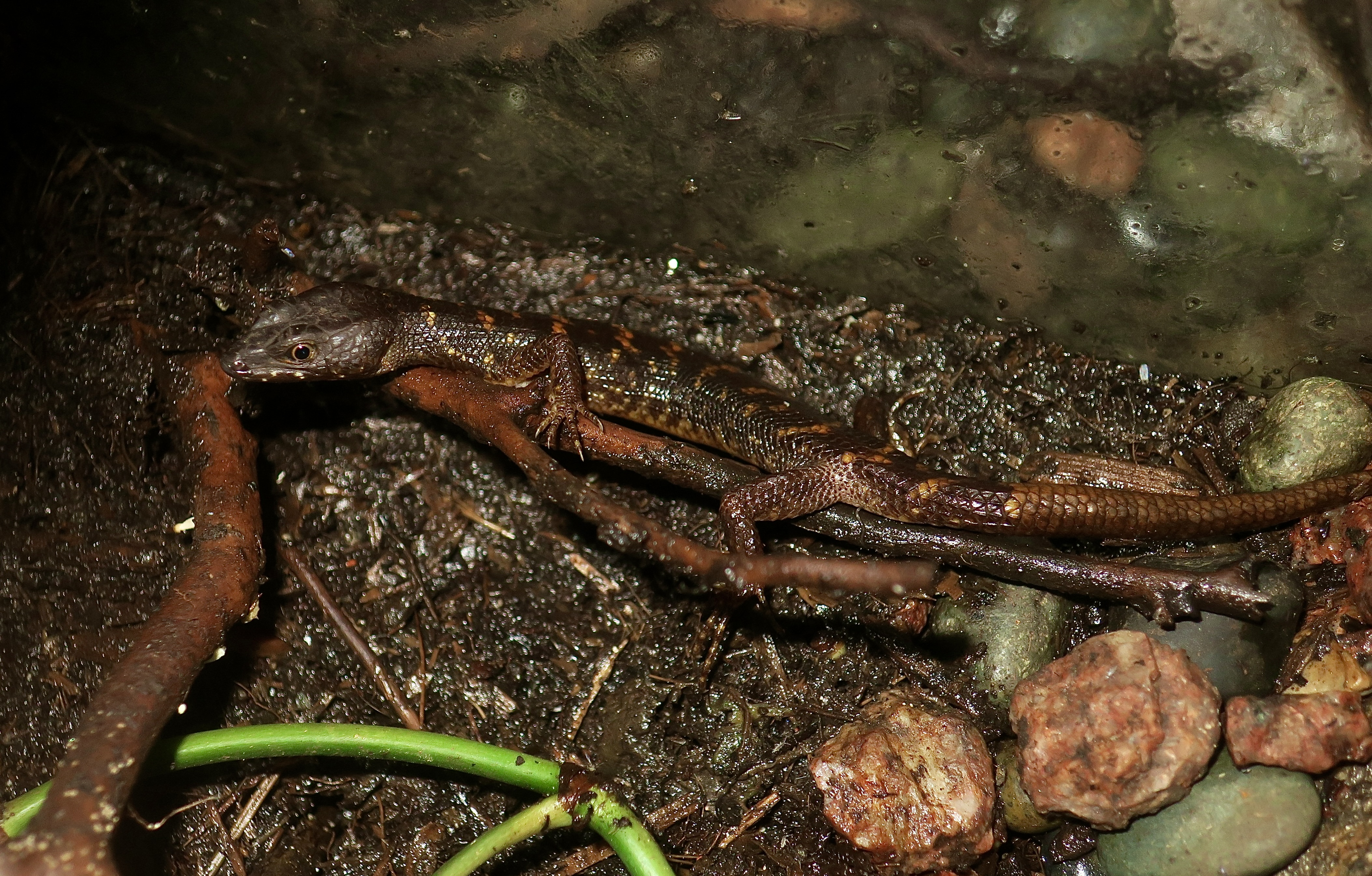

Conservation status
- Least Concern (IUCN 3.1)

Scientific classification
- Kingdom: Animalia
- Phylum: Chordata
- Class: Reptilia
- Order: Squamata
- Family: Scincidae
- Genus: Tropidophorus
- Species: T. murphyi

Binomial name
- Tropidophorus murphyi Hikida, Orlov, Nabhitabhata & Ota, 2002

= Tropidophorus murphyi =

Species of lizard

Tropidophorus murphyi, also known commonly as Murphy's water skink, is a species of lizard in the subfamily Sphenomorphinae of the family Scincidae. The species is endemic to Vietnam.

== Etymology ==
The specific name, murphyi, is in honor of Canadian herpetologist Robert Ward Murphy.

== Description ==
Adult males of Tropidophorus murphyi have a snout-to-vent length (SVL) of about 6.25–8.5 cm (2.46–3.35 in). Adult females are larger, about 8.0–9.5 cm (3.1–3.7 in) SVL.

== Geographic distribution ==
Tropidophorus murphyi is found in northern Vietnam, in Cao Bang Province.

== Habitat ==
The natural habitat of Tropidophorus murphyi is rocky streamsides in forest, at elevations of 700–750 m (2,300–2,460 ft).

== Reproduction ==
Tropidophorus murphyi bears live young by ovoviviparity. Litter size is three to five neonates.
