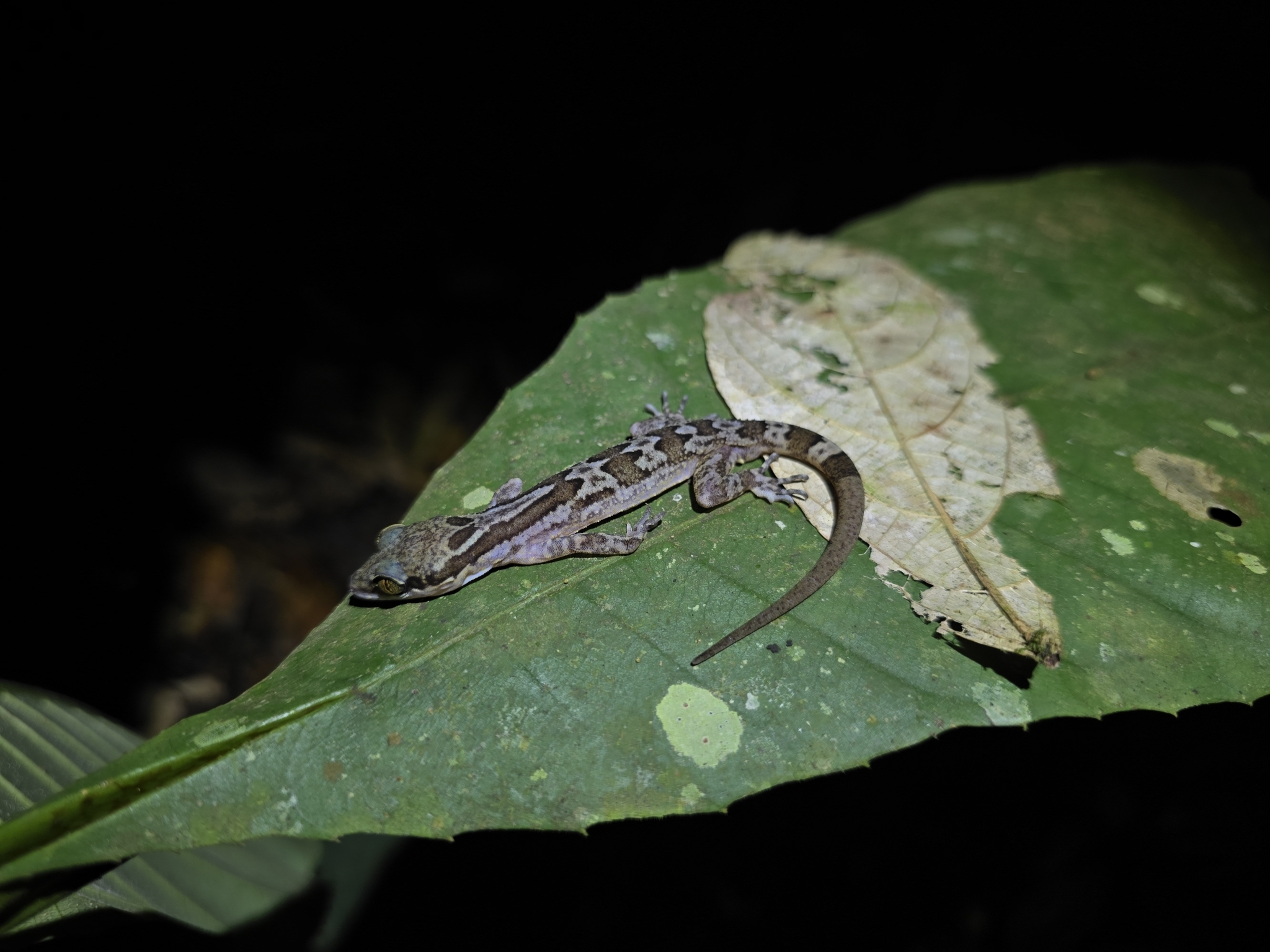

Scientific classification
- Kingdom: Animalia
- Phylum: Chordata
- Class: Reptilia
- Order: Squamata
- Suborder: Gekkota
- Family: Gekkonidae
- Genus: Cyrtodactylus
- Species: C. hamidyi

Binomial name
- Cyrtodactylus hamidyi Riyanto, Fauzi, Sidik, Mumpuni, Irham, Kurniawan, Ota, Okamoto, Hikida, & Grismer, 2021

= Cyrtodactylus hamidyi =

Species of lizard

Cyrtodactylus hamidyi (Hamidy's bent-toed gecko) is a species of bent toed gecko endemic to Kalimantan, Indonesia.
