= Gekko shibatai =

Conservation status
- Vulnerable (IUCN 3.1)

Scientific classification
- Kingdom: Animalia
- Phylum: Chordata
- Class: Reptilia
- Order: Squamata
- Suborder: Gekkota
- Family: Gekkonidae
- Genus: Gekko
- Species: G. shibatai

Binomial name
- Gekko shibatai Toda, Sengoku, Hikida & Ota, 2008

Synonyms
- Gekko shibatai Toda, Sengoku, Hikida & Ota, 2008; Gekko (Japonigekko) shibatai — Wood et al., 2019

Species of lizard

Gekko shibatai is a species of gecko, a lizard in the family Gekkonidae. The species is endemic to the Ryukyu Islands.

== Etymology ==
The specific name, shibatai, is in honor of Japanese herpetologist Yasuhiko Shibata.

== Geographic range ==
G. shibatai is found in the Tokara Group of the Ryukyu Islands. The type locality is Takarajima Island.

== Habitat ==
The preferred natural habitat of G. shibatai, is forest.

== Description ==
G. shibatai lacks distinct preanal pores even in the adult male.

== Reproduction ==
G. shibatai is oviparous.
