= Scincella dunan =

Scientific classification
- Kingdom: Animalia
- Phylum: Chordata
- Class: Reptilia
- Order: Squamata
- Family: Scincidae
- Genus: Scincella
- Species: S. dunan

Binomial name
- Scincella dunan Koizumi, Ota, & Hikida, 2022

Species of lizard

Scincella dunan is a species of skink endemic to Yonagunijima Island in Japan.
