= Tropidophorus robinsoni =

Conservation status
- Least Concern (IUCN 3.1)

Scientific classification
- Kingdom: Animalia
- Phylum: Chordata
- Class: Reptilia
- Order: Squamata
- Family: Scincidae
- Genus: Tropidophorus
- Species: T. robinsoni

Binomial name
- Tropidophorus robinsoni Smith, 1919

Species of lizard

Tropidophorus robinsoni, Robinson's water skink or Robinson's keeled skink, is a species of skink found in Myanmar and Thailand.
