= Tropidophorus guangxiensis =

Scientific classification
- Kingdom: Animalia
- Phylum: Chordata
- Class: Reptilia
- Order: Squamata
- Family: Scincidae
- Genus: Tropidophorus
- Species: T. guangxiensis

Binomial name
- Tropidophorus guangxiensis Wen, 1992

Species of lizard

Tropidophorus guangxiensis is a species of skink. It is endemic to southern China and is found in Guangxi and Hunan provinces.
