= Ota's bent-toed gecko =

Conservation status
- Endangered (IUCN 3.1)

Scientific classification
- Kingdom: Animalia
- Phylum: Chordata
- Class: Reptilia
- Order: Squamata
- Suborder: Gekkota
- Family: Gekkonidae
- Genus: Cyrtodactylus
- Species: C. otai

Binomial name
- Cyrtodactylus otai T.Q. Nguyen, M.D. Le, A.V. Pham, H.N. Ngo, C.V. Hoang, C.T. Pham & Ziegler, 2015

Species of lizard

Ota's bent-toed gecko (Cyrtodactylus otai) is a species of lizard in the family Gekkonidae. The species is endemic to Vietnam.

== Etymology ==
The specific name, otai, is in honor of Japanese herpetologist Hidetoshi Ota.

== Geographic range ==
C. otai is found in northwestern Vietnam, in Hòa Bình Province and Sơn La Province.

== Habitat ==
The preferred natural habitats of C. otai are forest and rocky areas, at altitudes of 980–1,230 m (3,220–4,040 ft).

== Description ==
Medium-sized for its genus, C. otai may attain a snout-to-vent length (SVL) of 9 cm (3.5 in).

== Reproduction ==
C. otai is oviparous. Clutch size is two eggs. Each egg measures on average 14 mm x 9 mm (0.55 in x 0.35 in).
