= Tropidophorus brookei =

Conservation status
- Least Concern (IUCN 3.1)

Scientific classification
- Kingdom: Animalia
- Phylum: Chordata
- Class: Reptilia
- Order: Squamata
- Family: Scincidae
- Genus: Tropidophorus
- Species: T. brookei

Binomial name
- Tropidophorus brookei (Gray, 1845)

Synonyms
- Norbea brookei Gray, 1845; Tropidophorus brookii [sic] — Boulenger, 1887; Norbea brookei — Mittleman, 1952; Tropidophorus brookei — Ota, Hikida, Matsui & Mori, 1991

Species of lizard

Tropidophorus brookei, also known commonly as Brook's keeled skink and Brooke's keeled skink, is a species of lizard in the family Scincidae. The species is endemic to the island of Borneo.

== Etymology ==
The specific name, brookei, is in honor of British adventurer James Brooke, who became the first White Rajah of Sarawak.

== Geographic range ==
T. brookei is found in all main administrative divisions of the island of Borneo: Kalimantan (Indonesia), Sabah and Sarawak (Malaysia), and Brunei.

== Habitat ==
The preferred natural habitats of T. brookei are forest and freshwater wetlands, at altitudes of 43–1,100 m (141–3,609 ft).

== Reproduction ==
T. brookei is viviparous.
