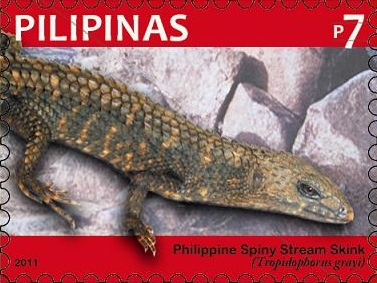

Conservation status
- Least Concern (IUCN 3.1)

Scientific classification
- Kingdom: Animalia
- Phylum: Chordata
- Class: Reptilia
- Order: Squamata
- Family: Scincidae
- Genus: Tropidophorus
- Species: T. grayi

Binomial name
- Tropidophorus grayi Günther, 1861
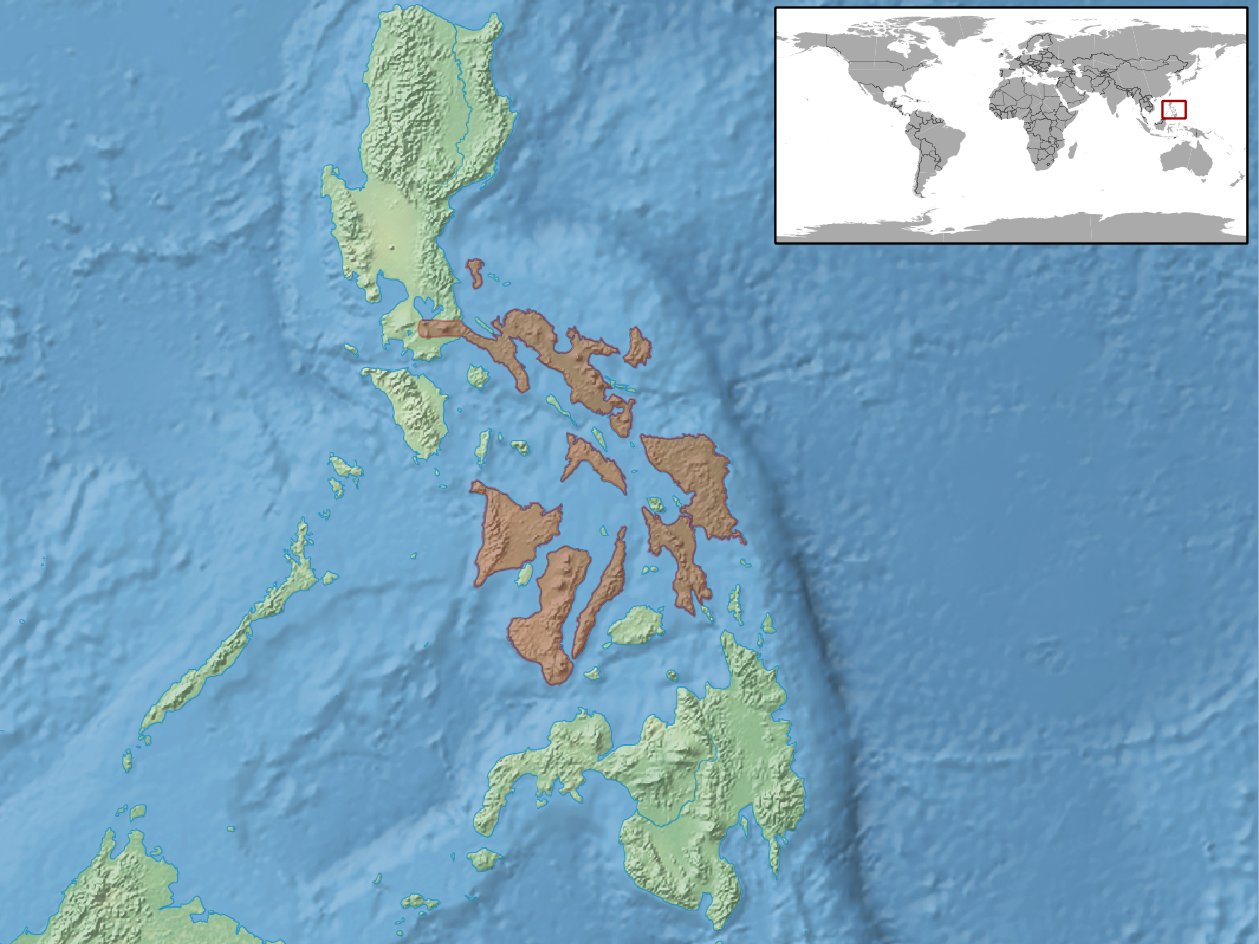
- Range of T. grayi in the Philippines

= Tropidophorus grayi =

Species of lizard

Tropidophorus grayi, commonly called the spiny waterside skink, Gray's keeled skink, Gray's water skink, and the Philippine spiny stream skink is a relatively abundant but secretive skink species, a lizard in the family Scincidae. The species is endemic to the Philippines.

== Habitat ==
The preferred natural habitats of T. grayi are forest and forest streams, at altitudes from sea level to 800 m (2,600 ft), but it has also been found in agricultural areas adjacent to forest.T. grayi lives by rivers and lakes, which gives it the common name waterside skink. Despite the warm climate in its native habitat, it prefers relatively cool temperatures in mountainous areas..

== Description ==
T. grayi has serrated scales (very spiky) which are grey-black in colour, but may also appear in pure black, reddish-brown or wooden-brown colours. The belly is white with or without brown blotches and is smooth and shiny. This makes this species look like a miniature crocodile.

== Behaviour ==
T. grayi is fast and agile. Despite its looks and speed, it is harmless, but it may occasionally bite hard, if handled. When threatened by predators this reptile hides in water. If left to swim in deep water, it may appear to drown, but it actually only plays dead. When removed, it may stay motionless for a few minutes and then return to its normal state. It is also an excellent climber, equipped with claws that can grip tree trunks and other wooden structures.

== Diet ==
T. grayi eats worms, insects, small snails, slugs, and small fishes (if it can catch one).

== In captivity ==
In captivity, it is observed that T. grayi likes to stack itself in piles, like turtles basking in the sun, and would rather stay on dry land than in water. It is becoming quite popular as an exotic pet due to its crocodilian appearance and cheap price in the Philippines.

== Tail regeneration ==
Like almost any species in the skink family, T. grayi can regrow its tail if severed, but the replacement tail usually is shorter and has fewer spikes than the original tail. Also, the tail of T. grayi is tougher to break than the tail of most other skinks.

== Reproduction ==
T. grayi is ovoviviparous.

Total length (including tail)	Number of young	Status (how common)
20–25 cm or 8–11 inches (females) / 5-9 inches (males)	1–6 live young	Locally common (common in certain areas)

== Etymology ==
The specific name, grayi, is in honor of British herpetologist John Edward Gray.
