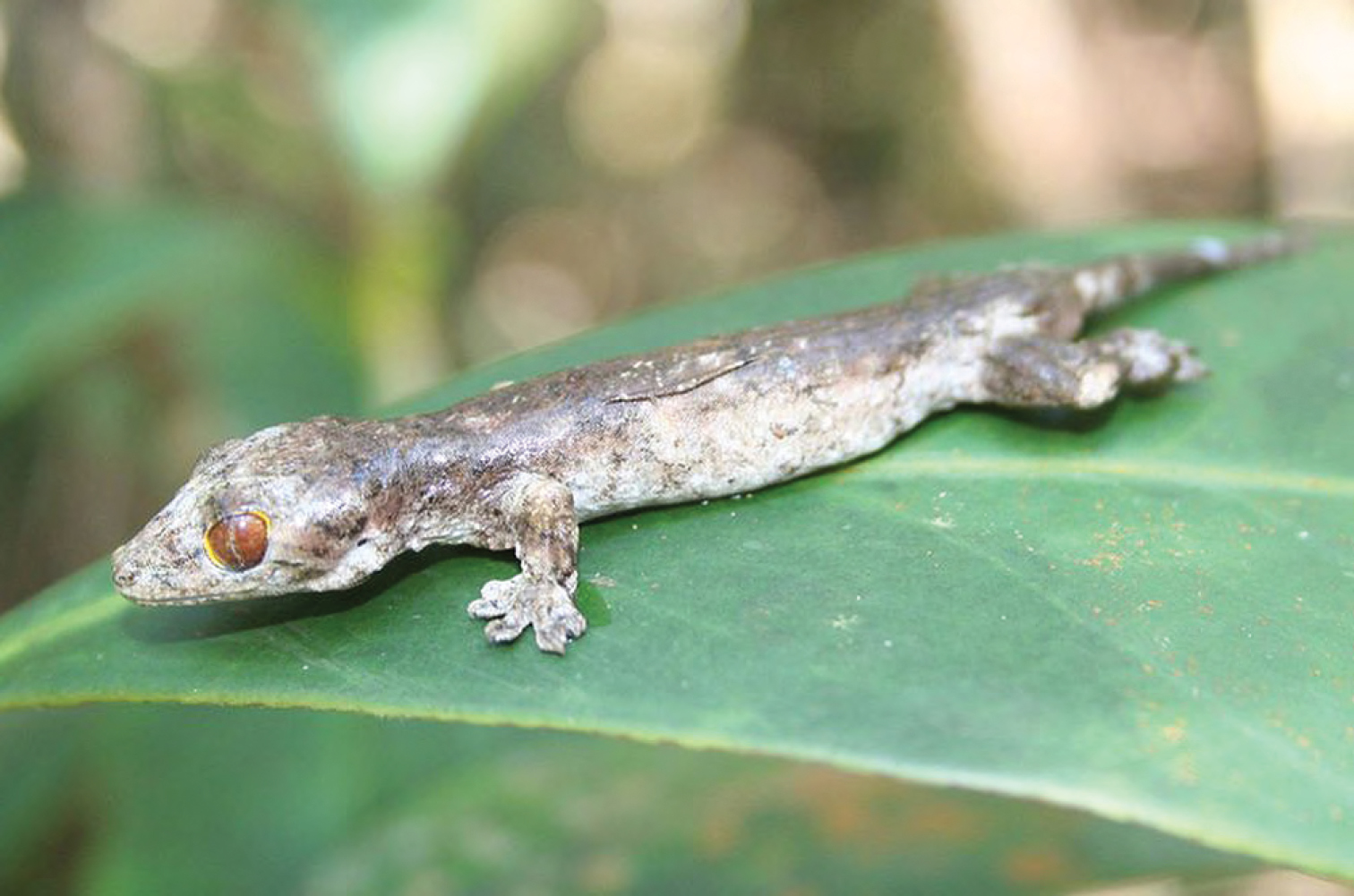
- Luperosaurus kubli.

Scientific classification
- Kingdom: Animalia
- Phylum: Chordata
- Class: Reptilia
- Order: Squamata
- Suborder: Gekkota
- Family: Gekkonidae
- Subfamily: Gekkoninae
- Genus: Luperosaurus; Gray, 1845

= Luperosaurus =

Genus of lizards

Luperosaurus is a genus of lizards, commonly known as camouflage geckos, fringed geckos, wolf geckos, and flap-legged geckos, in the family Gekkonidae. The genus is native to Southeast Asia.

== Geographic range ==
Species in the genus Luperosaurus are found in the Southeast Asian mainland and archipelago, extending from the Malay Peninsula, through the Philippines and Indonesia.

== Description ==
These are small geckos, characterized by the flaps of skin on the front and rear of their limbs and sometimes, along their bodies.

== Taxonomy ==
The original spelling intended was Lyperosaurus (= vexing gecko), for possessing characters from two different genera known to John Edward Gray, who named the genus. Most species of Lupersaurus are known from one or a few specimens.

== Behavior ==
Members of the genus Luperosaurus are presumably highly arboreal.

== Species ==
The following 9 species are recognized as being valid.

- Luperosaurus angliit R.M. Brown, Diesmos & Oliveros, 2011
- Luperosaurus brooksii (Boulenger, 1920) - Brooks's wolf gecko
- Luperosaurus corfieldi Gaulke, Rösler & R.M. Brown, 2007 – Corfield's fringed gecko
- Luperosaurus cumingii Gray, 1845 – Philippine fringed gecko, Philippine wolf gecko, Cuming's flap-legged gecko
- Luperosaurus joloensis Taylor, 1918 – Taylor's wolf gecko, Jolo flapped-legged gecko, Taylor's fringed gecko
- Luperosaurus kubli R.M. Brown, Diesmos & M.V. Duya, 2007
- Luperosaurus macgregori Stejneger, 1907 – MacGregor's wolf gecko, McGregor's flapped-legged gecko, MacGregor's fringed gecko
- Luperosaurus palawanensis W.C. Brown & Alcala, 1978 – Palawan wolf gecko, Palawan flapped-legged gecko
- Luperosaurus yasumai Ota, Sengoku & Hikida, 1996 – Yasuma's fringed gecko

Nota bene: A binomial authority in parentheses indicates that the species was originally described in a genus other than Luperosaurus.
