= Tropidophorus hangnam =

Scientific classification
- Kingdom: Animalia
- Phylum: Chordata
- Class: Reptilia
- Order: Squamata
- Family: Scincidae
- Genus: Tropidophorus
- Species: T. hangnam

Binomial name
- Tropidophorus hangnam Chuaynkern, Nabhitabhata, Inthara, Kamsook, & Somsri, 2005

Species of lizard

Tropidophorus hangnam is a species of skink found in Thailand.
