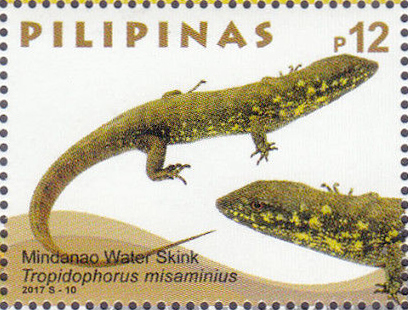

Conservation status
- Least Concern (IUCN 3.1)

Scientific classification
- Domain: Eukaryota
- Kingdom: Animalia
- Phylum: Chordata
- Class: Reptilia
- Order: Squamata
- Family: Scincidae
- Genus: Tropidophorus
- Species: T. misaminius

Binomial name
- Tropidophorus misaminius Stejneger, 1908
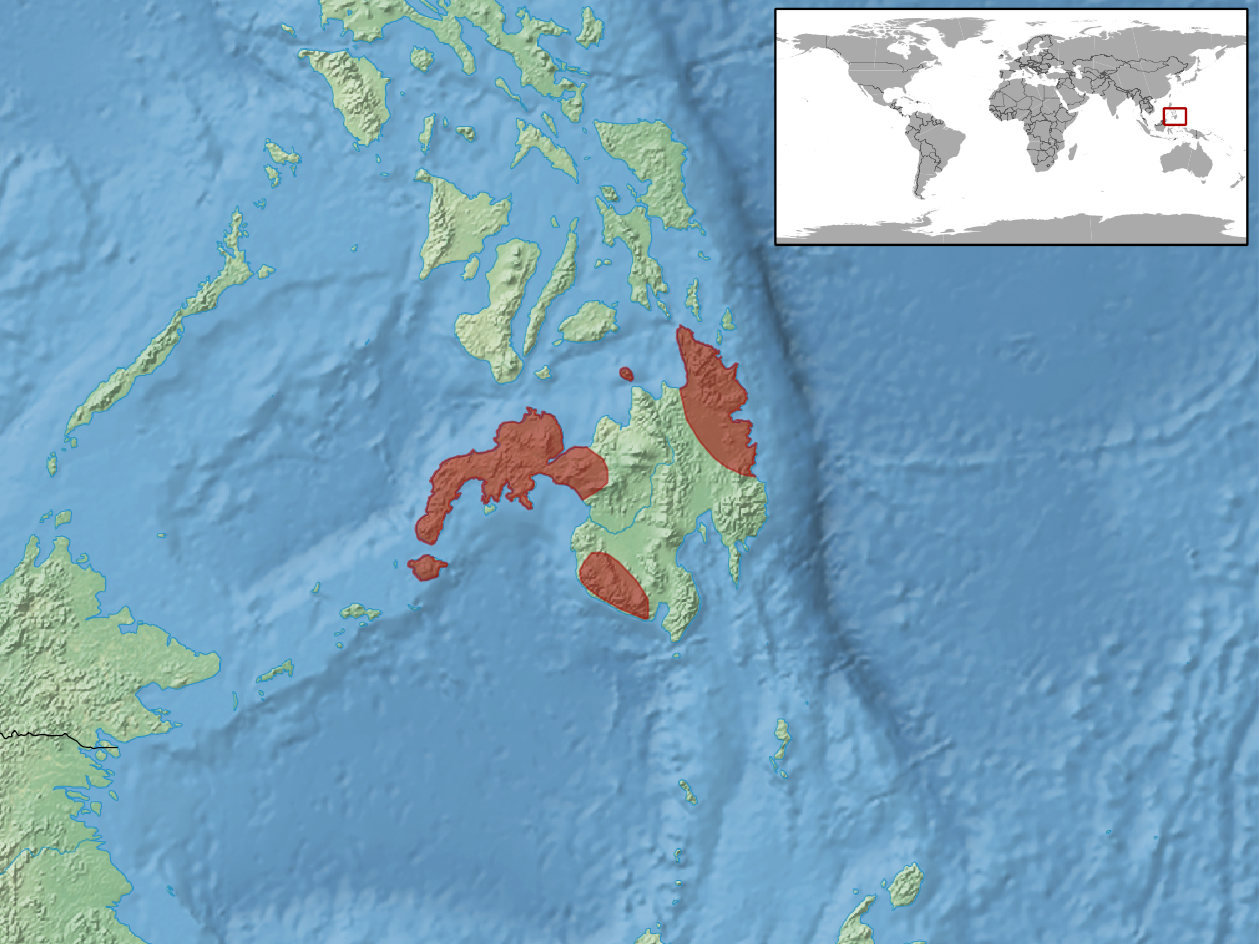

= Tropidophorus misaminius =

Species of lizard

Tropidophorus misaminius, the Misamis waterside skink, is a species of skink. It is endemic to the Philippines, where it is found on several islands at elevations of 350 to 1500 m above sea level. Its body is covered with pointed scales that likely deter predators. This species typically lives at the banks of streams and rivers and in forests, where they live under decayed logs. Near water they usually hide under rocks and warm up under the sun on those rocks when there is no danger around.
