= Lepidodactylus vanuatuensis =

Conservation status
- Least Concern (IUCN 3.1)

Scientific classification
- Kingdom: Animalia
- Phylum: Chordata
- Class: Reptilia
- Order: Squamata
- Suborder: Gekkota
- Family: Gekkonidae
- Genus: Lepidodactylus
- Species: L. vanuatuensis

Binomial name
- Lepidodactylus vanuatuensis Ota, Fisher, Ineich, Case, Radtkey, & Zug, 1998
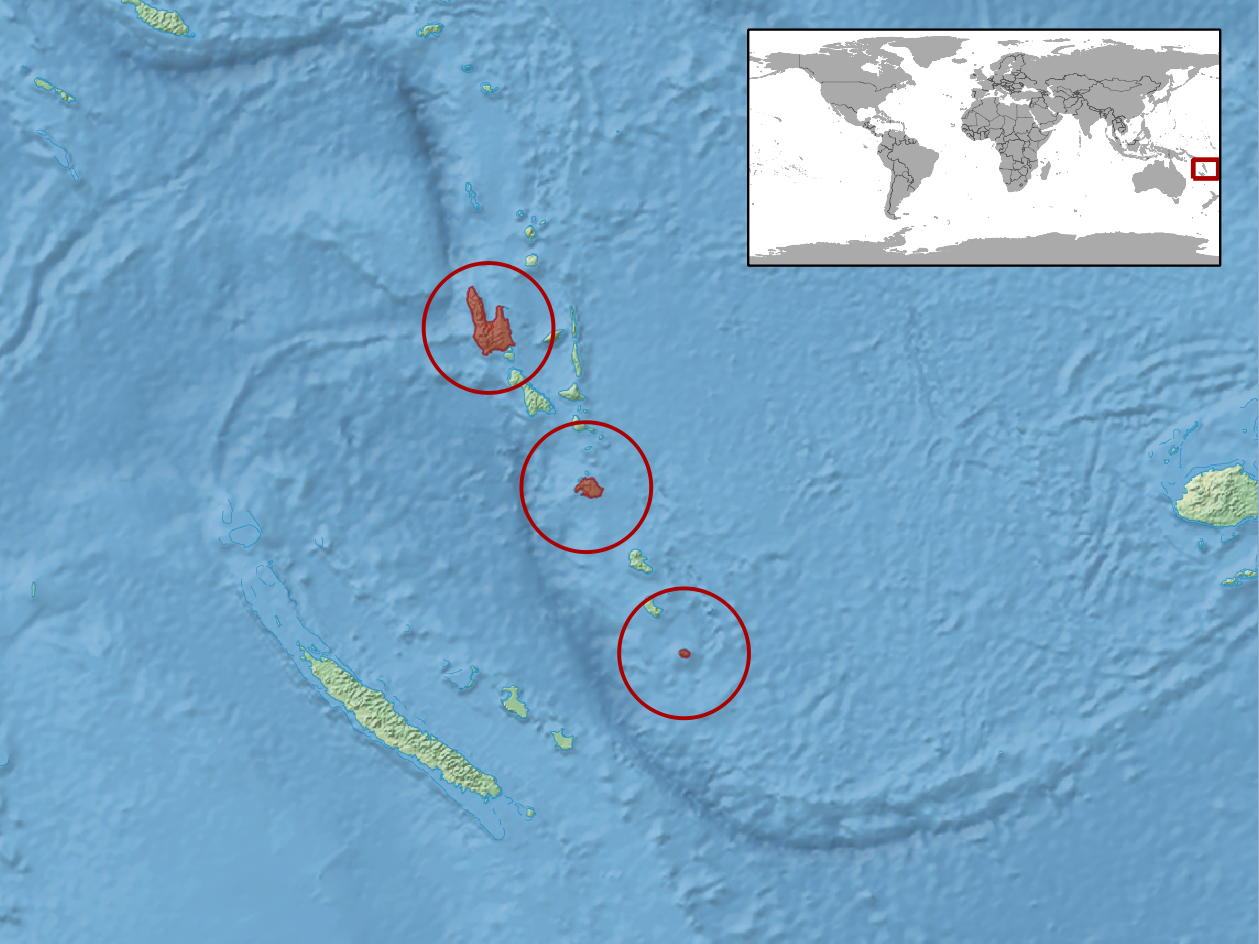

Species of lizard

Lepidodactylus vanuatuensis is a species of gecko. It is endemic to Vanuatu.
