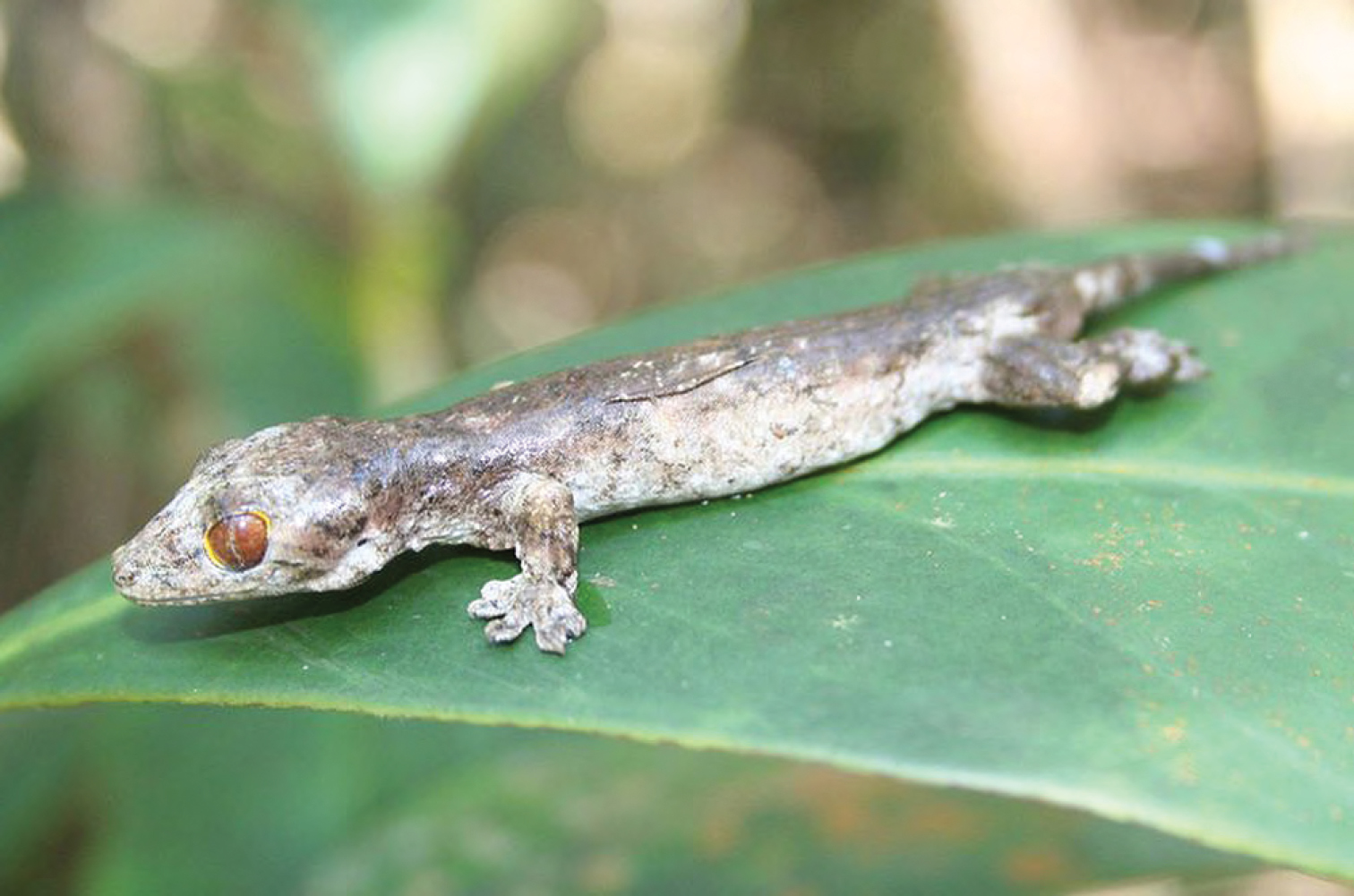

Conservation status
- Least Concern (IUCN 3.1)

Scientific classification
- Kingdom: Animalia
- Phylum: Chordata
- Class: Reptilia
- Order: Squamata
- Suborder: Gekkota
- Family: Gekkonidae
- Genus: Luperosaurus
- Species: L. kubli

Binomial name
- Luperosaurus kubli R.M. Brown, Diesmos & Duya, 2007
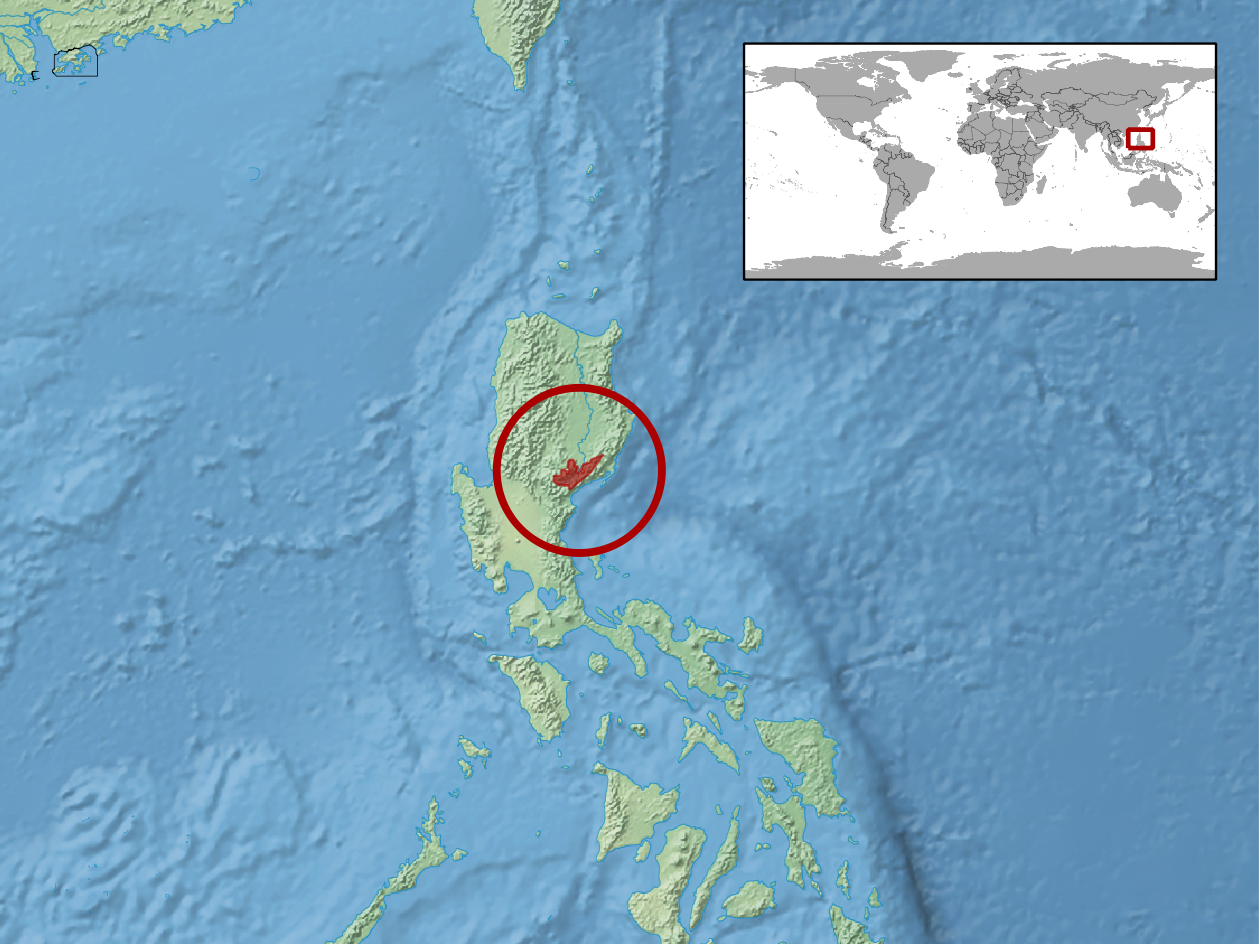

= Luperosaurus kubli =

Species of lizard

Luperosaurus kubli is a species of gecko, a lizard in the family Gekkonidae. The species is endemic to Luzon in the Philippines.

== Habitat ==
The preferred natural habitat of L. kubli is forest, at altitudes of 650–1,100 m (2,130–3,610 ft).

== Description ==
L. kubli has webbing between all adjacent fingers and toes, a cutaneous fold on the front legs, and a flap on the hind legs.

== Behavior ==
L. kubli has the ability to glide or parachute from tree to tree.

== Reproduction ==
L. kubli is oviparous.
