= Tropidophorus partelloi =

Conservation status
- Least Concern (IUCN 3.1)

Scientific classification
- Kingdom: Animalia
- Phylum: Chordata
- Class: Reptilia
- Order: Squamata
- Family: Scincidae
- Genus: Tropidophorus
- Species: T. partelloi

Binomial name
- Tropidophorus partelloi Stejneger, 1910
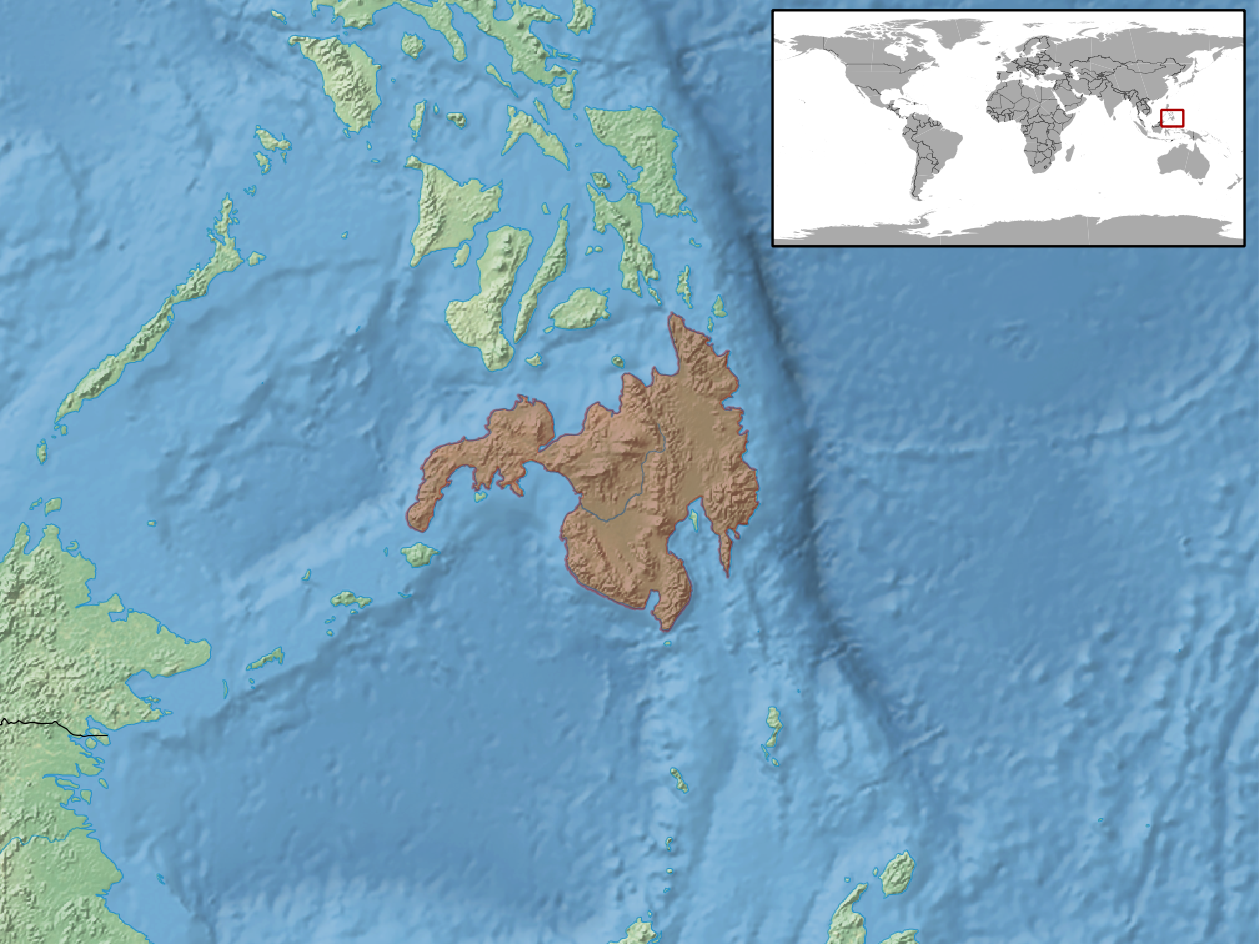

Synonyms
- Norbea partelloi (Stejneger, 1910)

Species of lizard

Tropidophorus partelloi, also known commonly as Partello's waterside skink, is a species of lizard in the subfamily Sphenomorphinae of the family Scincidae. The species is endemic to the Philippines.

== Etymology ==
The specific name, partelloi, is in honor of United States Army officer Joseph McDowell Trimble Partello (1851–1934), who served in the Philippines.

== Geographic distribution ==
In the Philippines, Tropidophorus partelloi is found on the island of Mindanao.

== Habitat ==
The preferred natural habitat of Tropidophorus partelloi is forest, at elevations of 450–1,200 m (1,480–3,940 ft).

== Behavior ==
Tropidophorus partelloi is terrestrial, sheltering ynder logs and rocks.

== Reproduction ==
Tropidophorus partelloi is ovoviviparous.
