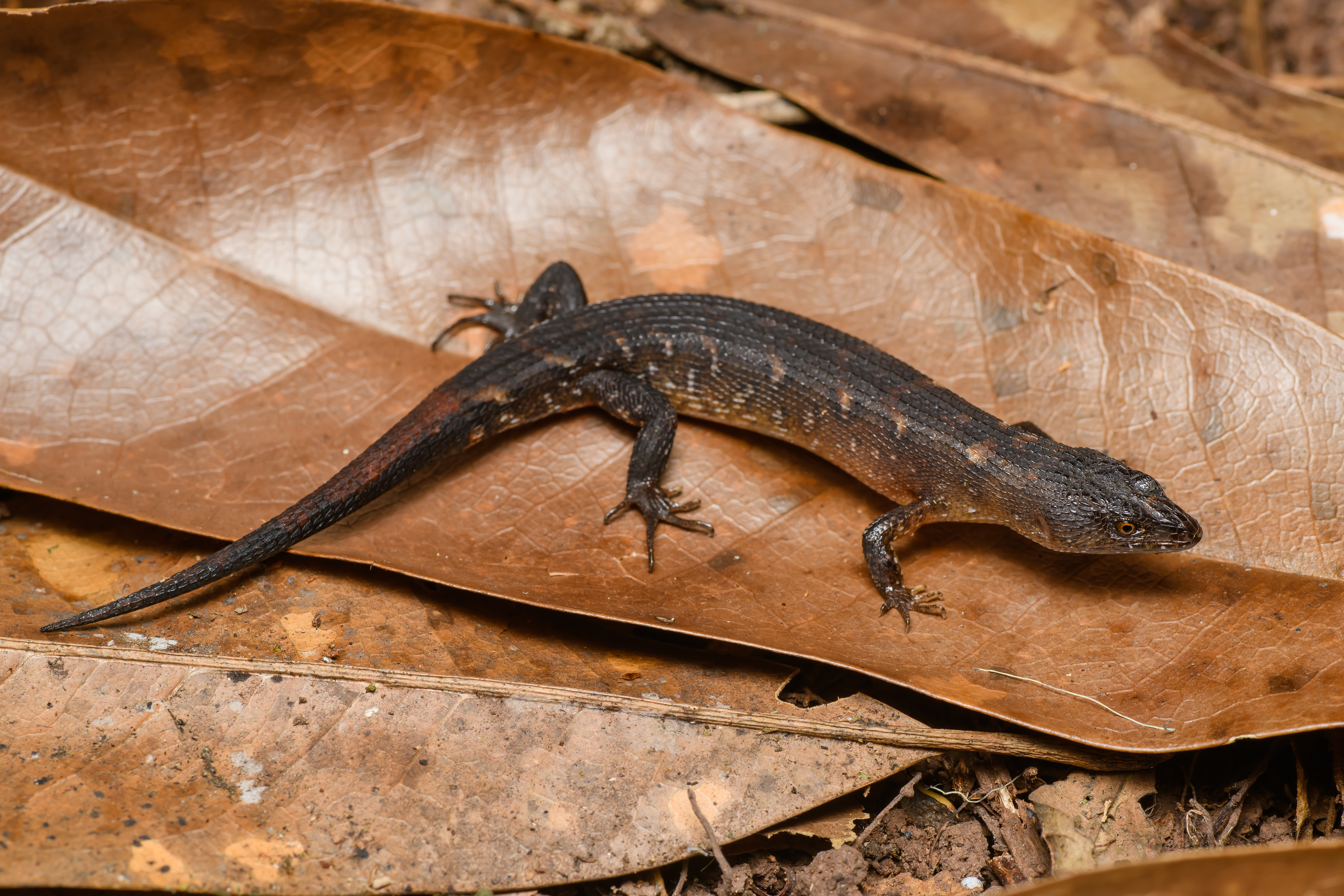

Conservation status
- Least Concern (IUCN 3.1)

Scientific classification
- Kingdom: Animalia
- Phylum: Chordata
- Class: Reptilia
- Order: Squamata
- Family: Scincidae
- Genus: Tropidophorus
- Species: T. thai

Binomial name
- Tropidophorus thai (M.A. Smith, 1919)

Synonyms
- Tropidophorus thai - M.A. Smith 1935; Tropidophorus thai - Taylor 1963; Tropidophorus thai - COX et al. 1998; Tropidophorus thai - HONDA et al. 2006

= Tropidophorus thai =

Species of lizard

Tropidophorus thai, commonly known as Thai water skink, or Thai stream skink is a species of skink found in Thailand and Burma.
