= Tropidophorus baviensis =

Conservation status
- Least Concern (IUCN 3.1)

Scientific classification
- Kingdom: Animalia
- Phylum: Chordata
- Class: Reptilia
- Order: Squamata
- Family: Scincidae
- Genus: Tropidophorus
- Species: T. baviensis

Binomial name
- Tropidophorus baviensis Bourret, 1939

Species of lizard

Tropidophorus baviensis, also known commonly as the Bavi water skink or Bavay's keeled skink, is a species of lizard in the subfamily Sphenomorphinae of the family Scincidae. The species is native to Southeast Asia.

== Geographic range ==
T. baviensis is found in northern Vietnam and in adjacent northeastern Laos (Xiangkhouang Province). Records from Thailand are considered erroneous.

The type locality (to which the specific name baviensis refers) is Mt. Ba Vi, Ha Tay Province, northern Vietnam.

== Habitat ==
The preferred natural habitats of T. baviensis are forest and freshwater wetlands, at altitudes of 400–1,500 m (1,300–4,900 ft).

== Reproduction ==
T. baviensis is viviparous.
