= Tropidophorus sebi =

Conservation status
- Data Deficient (IUCN 3.1)

Scientific classification
- Kingdom: Animalia
- Phylum: Chordata
- Class: Reptilia
- Order: Squamata
- Family: Scincidae
- Genus: Tropidophorus
- Species: T. sebi

Binomial name
- Tropidophorus sebi Pui, Karin, Bauer, & Das, 2017

Species of lizard

Tropidophorus sebi, the Baleh water skink, is a species of skink. It is endemic to Sarawak in Malaysian Borneo.
