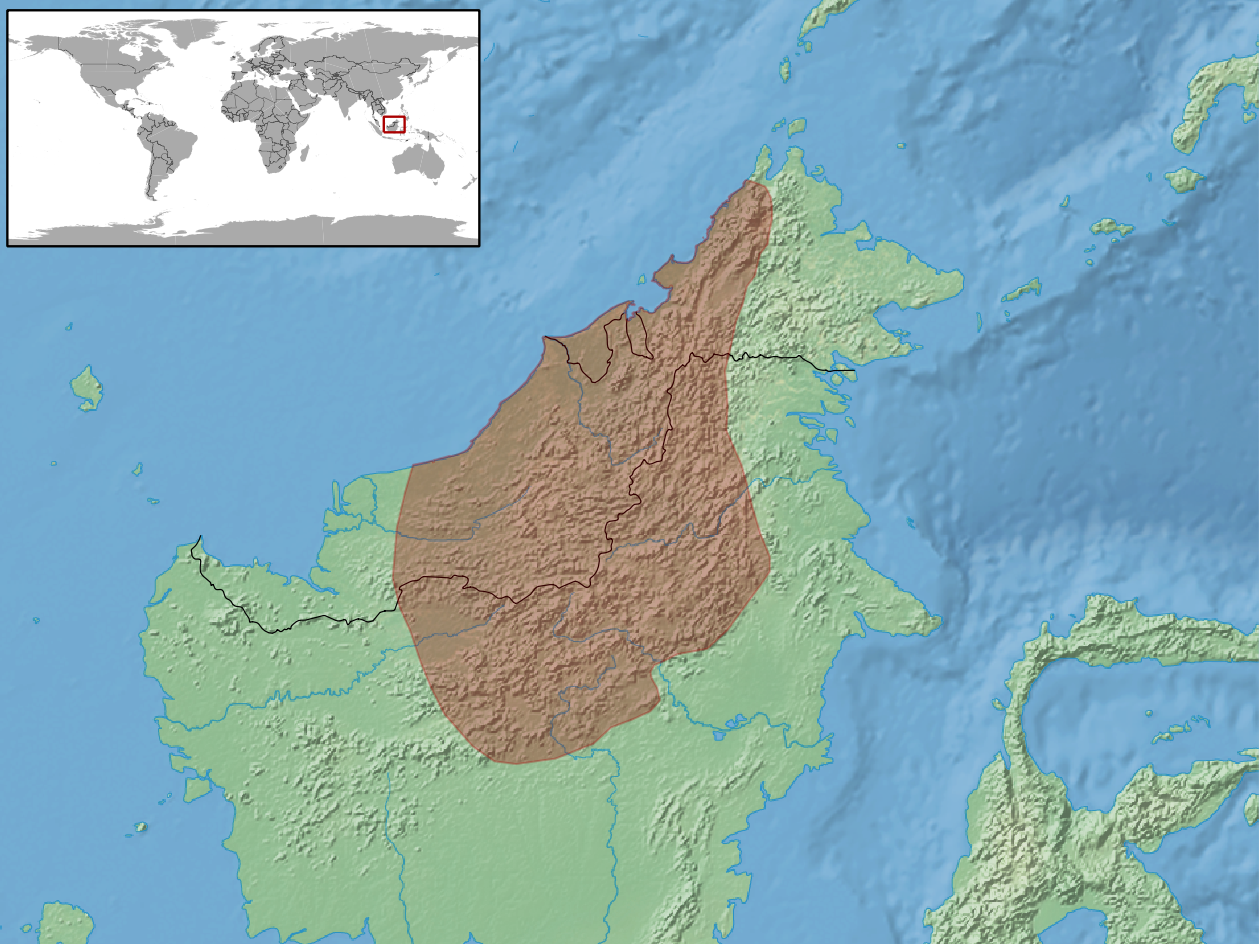
- Geographic distribution of Tropidophorus mocquardii

Scientific classification
- Kingdom: Animalia
- Phylum: Chordata
- Class: Reptilia
- Order: Squamata
- Family: Scincidae
- Genus: Tropidophorus
- Species: T. mocquardii

Binomial name
- Tropidophorus mocquardii Boulenger, 1895

= Tropidophorus mocquardii =

Species of lizard

Tropidophorus mocquardii is a species of lizard in the subfamily Sphenomorphinae of the family Scincidae (skinks). The species is native to Malaysia.

== Etymology ==
The specific name, mocquardii, is in honor of French herpetologist François Mocquard.

== Description ==
Tropidophorus mocquardii may attain a snout-to-vent length (SVL) of 9.5 cm (3.7 in). It has 34 scale rows around the body at midbody. Dorsally, it is brown with darker crossbars. The flanks have white spots. Ventrally, it is cream-colored.

== Geographic distribution ==
Tropidophorus mocquardii is found in the northern part of the island of Borneo.

== Reproduction ==
Tropidophorus mocquardii is ovoviviparous.
