= Tropidophorus cocincinensis =

Conservation status
- Least Concern (IUCN 3.1)

Scientific classification
- Kingdom: Animalia
- Phylum: Chordata
- Class: Reptilia
- Order: Squamata
- Family: Scincidae
- Genus: Tropidophorus
- Species: T. cocincinensis

Binomial name
- Tropidophorus cocincinensis Duméril & Bibron, 1839

Species of lizard

Tropidophorus cocincinensis, the Cochinchinese water skink, is a species of skink found in Thailand, Cambodia, Laos, and Vietnam.
