= Seventy Islands gecko =

Conservation status
- Vulnerable (IUCN 3.1)

Scientific classification
- Kingdom: Animalia
- Phylum: Chordata
- Class: Reptilia
- Order: Squamata
- Suborder: Gekkota
- Family: Gekkonidae
- Genus: Lepidodactylus
- Species: L. paurolepis

Binomial name
- Lepidodactylus paurolepis Ota, Fisher, & Ineich, 1995

Species of lizard

The Seventy Islands gecko (Lepidodactylus paurolepis) is a lizard endemic to Palau.
