= Tropidophorus noggei =

Conservation status
- Least Concern (IUCN 3.1)

Scientific classification
- Kingdom: Animalia
- Phylum: Chordata
- Class: Reptilia
- Order: Squamata
- Family: Scincidae
- Genus: Tropidophorus
- Species: T. noggei

Binomial name
- Tropidophorus noggei Ziegler, V.N. Thanh & B.N. Thanh, 2005

Species of lizard

Tropidophorus noggei, also known commonly as Nogge's water skink, is a species of lizard in the subfamily Sphenomorphinae of the family Scincidae (skinks). The species is endemic to Vietnam.

== Etymology ==
The specific name, noggei, is in honor of German zoologist Gunther Nogge (1942–2025), who was Director of the Cologne Zoological Garden (1981–2007).

== Geographic distribution ==
Tropidophorus noggei is found in central Vietnam, in Quang Tri province.

== Habitat ==
The preferred natural habitat of Tropidophorus noggei is karst rock outcrops in forest.

== Behavior ==
Tropidophorus noggei is terrestrial.

== Diet ==
Tropidophorus noggei preys on centipedes and insects.

== Reproduction ==
Tropidophorus noggei is ovoviviparous.
