= Tropidophorus microlepis =

Conservation status
- Least Concern (IUCN 3.1)

Scientific classification
- Kingdom: Animalia
- Phylum: Chordata
- Class: Reptilia
- Order: Squamata
- Family: Scincidae
- Genus: Tropidophorus
- Species: T. microlepis

Binomial name
- Tropidophorus microlepis Günther, 1861

Species of lizard

Tropidophorus microlepis, the small-scaled water skink, is a species of skink found in Laos, Vietnam, Cambodia, and Thailand.
