= Batan scaly-toed gecko =

Conservation status
- Least Concern (IUCN 3.1)

Scientific classification
- Kingdom: Animalia
- Phylum: Chordata
- Class: Reptilia
- Order: Squamata
- Suborder: Gekkota
- Family: Gekkonidae
- Genus: Lepidodactylus
- Species: L. balioburius

Binomial name
- Lepidodactylus balioburius Ota & Crombie, 1989
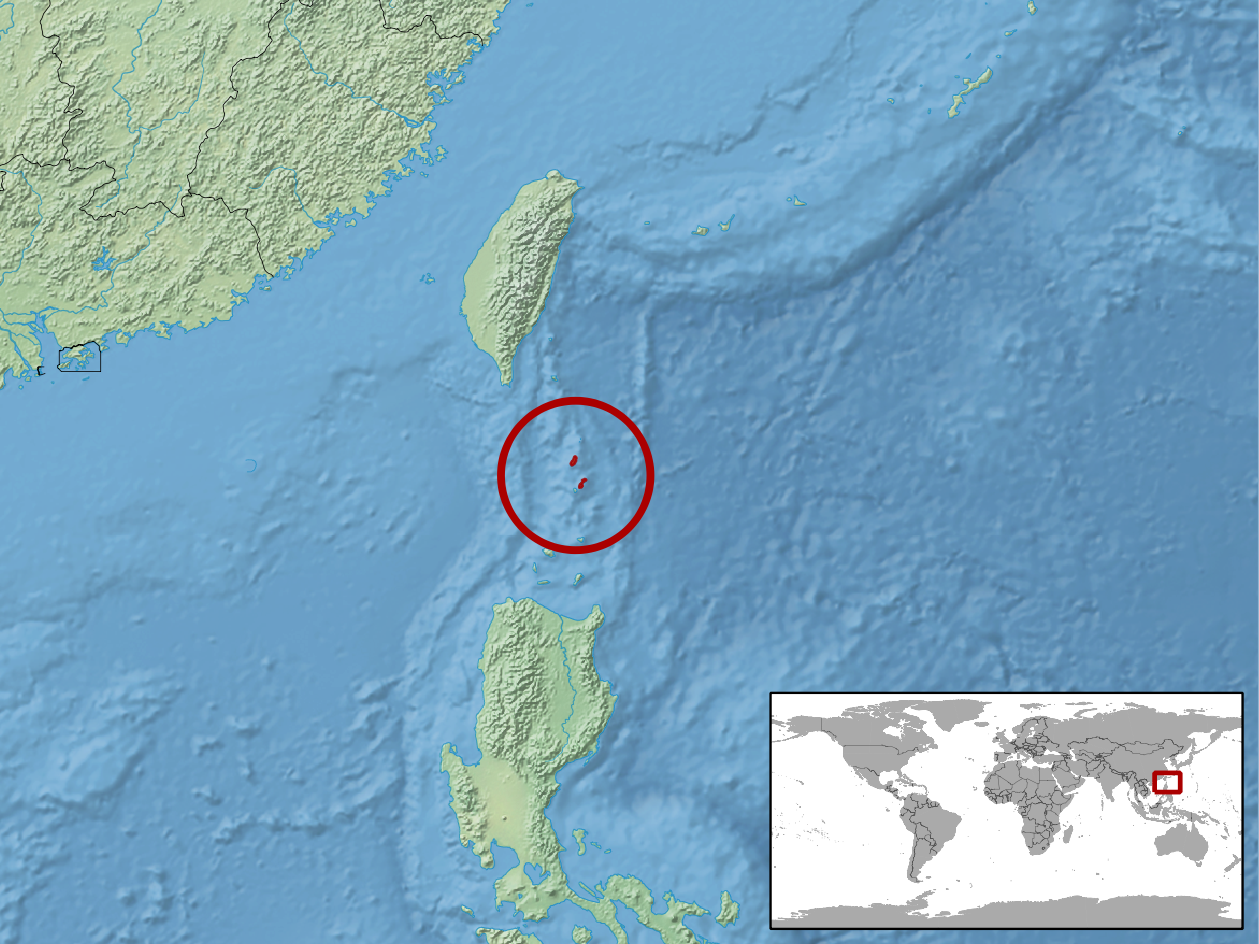

Species of lizard

The Batan scaly-toed gecko (Lepidodactylus balioburius) is a species of gecko. It is endemic to the Philippines.

Recent developments in the field of phylogeny have led to the discovery of many species such as Lepidodactylus balioburius, which originate in Batan, Philippines. Some scientists believe that Lepidodactylus balioburius and another species in the Lepidodactylus genus, Lepidodactylus yami, are closely related based on phenotypes, or observable traits.
