= Luperosaurus corfieldi =

Conservation status
- Data Deficient (IUCN 3.1)

Scientific classification
- Kingdom: Animalia
- Phylum: Chordata
- Class: Reptilia
- Order: Squamata
- Suborder: Gekkota
- Family: Gekkonidae
- Genus: Luperosaurus
- Species: L. corfieldi

Binomial name
- Luperosaurus corfieldi Gaulke, Rösler & R.M. Brown, 2007
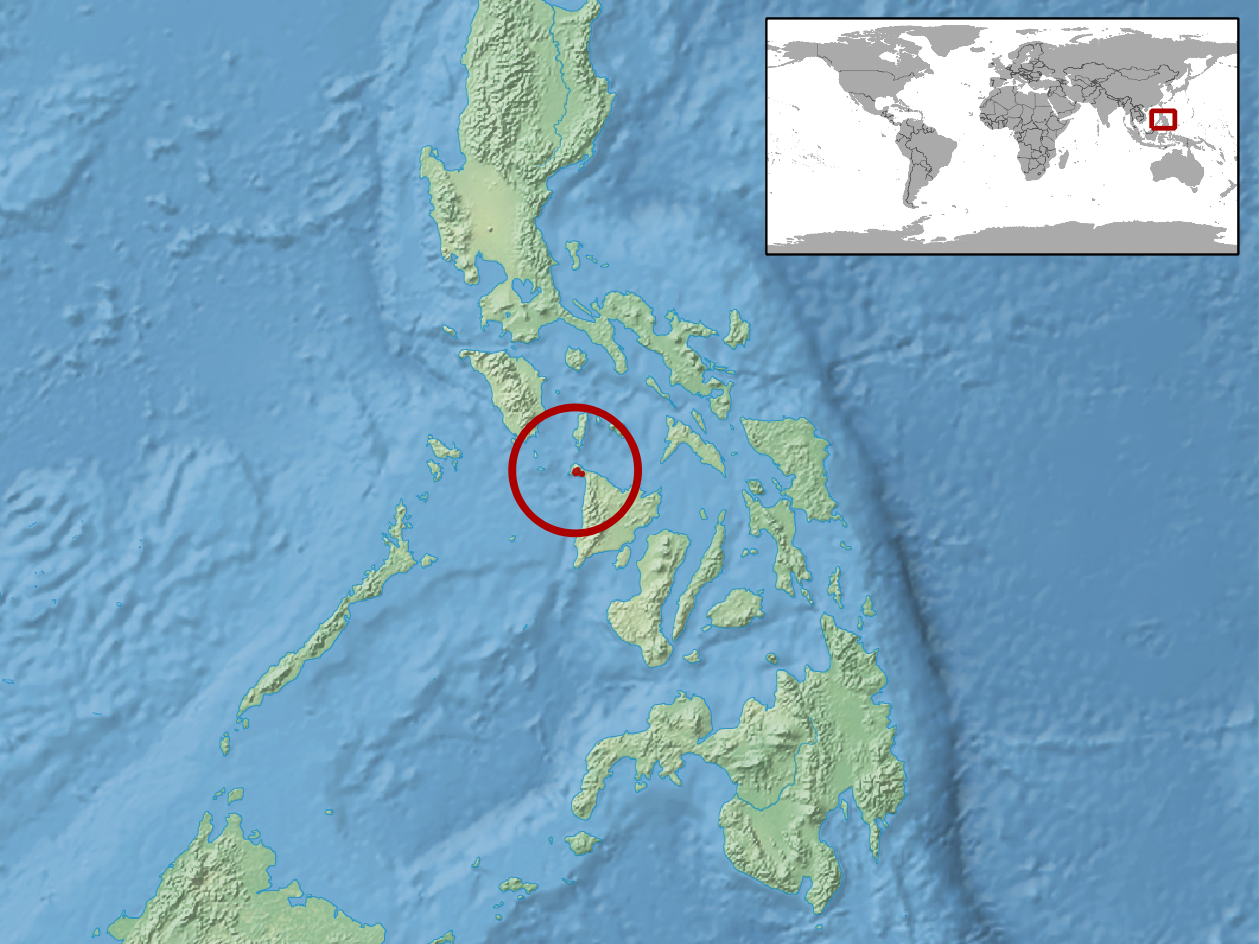

Species of lizard

Luperosaurus corfieldi is a species of gecko, a lizard in the family Gekkonidae. The species is endemic to the Philippines.

== Etymology ==
The specific name, corfieldi, is in honor of English-born American businessman Charles Corfield for his support of biodiversity research and nature conservation in the Philippines.

== Habitat ==
The preferred natural habitat of L. corfieldi is forest, at an altitude of 450 m (1,480 ft).

== Description ==
Large and robust for the genus Luperosaurus, adults of L. corfieldi have a snout-to-vent length (SVL) of 7.0–9.5 cm (2.8–3.7 in).

== Reproduction ==
L. corfieldi is oviparous.
