= Tropidophorus boehmei =

Conservation status
- Near Threatened (IUCN 3.1)

Scientific classification
- Kingdom: Animalia
- Phylum: Chordata
- Class: Reptilia
- Order: Squamata
- Family: Scincidae
- Genus: Tropidophorus
- Species: T. boehmei

Binomial name
- Tropidophorus boehmei T.Q. Nguyen, T.T. Nguyen, Schmitz, Orlov & Ziegler, 2010

Species of lizard

Tropidophorus boehmei, also known commonly as Boehme's water skink, is a species of lizard in the family Scincidae. The species is native to Vietnam.

== Etymology ==
The specific name, boehmei, is in honor of German herpetologist Wolfgang Böhme.

== Geographic range ==
T. boehmei is endemic to Lào Cai Province in northern Vietnam.

== Habitat ==
The preferred natural habitats of T. boehmei are forest and freshwater streams, at altitudes of 1,200–1,300 m (3,900–4,300 ft).

== Description ==
Large for its genus, T. boehmei may attain a snout-to-vent length (SVL) of about 10.5 cm (4.1 in). Dorsally, it is dark gray, with a pattern of lighter crossbands and white dots.

== Diet ==
T. boehmi preys upon spiders.

== Reproduction ==
The mode of reproduction of T. boehmi is unknown.
