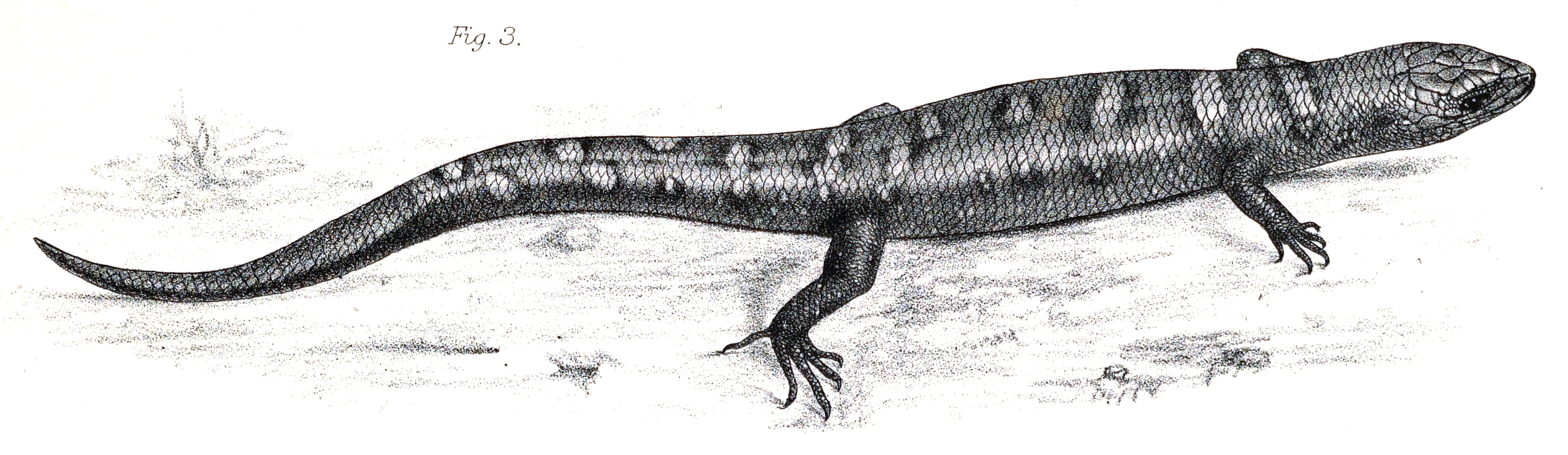

Conservation status
- Least Concern (IUCN 3.1)

Scientific classification
- Kingdom: Animalia
- Phylum: Chordata
- Class: Reptilia
- Order: Squamata
- Family: Scincidae
- Genus: Tropidophorus
- Species: T. berdmorei

Binomial name
- Tropidophorus berdmorei (Blyth, 1853)

Synonyms
- Aspris Berdmorei Blyth, 1853; Tropidophorus Berdmorei — Theobald 1868; Tropidophorus yunnanensis Boulenger, 1887; Tropidophorus berdmorei — M.A. Smith 1935; Tropidophorus berdmorei — Taylor, 1963; Tropidophorus berdmorei — Cox et al., 1998; Tropidophorus berdmorei — Honda et al., 2006

= Tropidophorus berdmorei =

Species of lizard

Tropidophorus berdmorei, commonly known as Berdmore's water skink, is a species of lizard in the family Scincidae. The species is endemic to Asia.

== Geographic range ==
T. berdmorei is found in China, Myanmar, Thailand and Vietnam.

== Etymology ==
The specific name, berdmorei, is in honor of British naturalist Captain Thomas Matthew Berdmore (1811–1859), who collected the holotype.

== Habitat ==
The preferred natural habitat of T. berdmorei is rocky streams in forest, at altitudes of 170–1,000 m (560–3,280 ft).

== Diet ==
T. berdmorei preys upon worms, insects, and small crustaceans.

== Reproduction ==
T. berdmorei is viviparous, meaning they give live birth.
