= Tropidophorus assamensis =

Scientific classification
- Kingdom: Animalia
- Phylum: Chordata
- Class: Reptilia
- Order: Squamata
- Family: Scincidae
- Genus: Tropidophorus
- Species: T. assamensis

Binomial name
- Tropidophorus assamensis Annandale, 1912

Species of lizard

Tropidophorus assamensis, sometimes known as the north-eastern water skink, is a species of skink.

== Distribution ==
It is found only in Northeast India (Mizoram, Assam) and Bangladesh. It might occur in Bhutan.

== Habitation ==
Individuals have been collected on or near (dry) stream beds. It is viviparous.
