= Luperosaurus macgregori =

Conservation status
- Near Threatened (IUCN 3.1)

Scientific classification
- Kingdom: Animalia
- Phylum: Chordata
- Class: Reptilia
- Order: Squamata
- Suborder: Gekkota
- Family: Gekkonidae
- Genus: Luperosaurus
- Species: L. macgregori

Binomial name
- Luperosaurus macgregori Stejneger, 1907
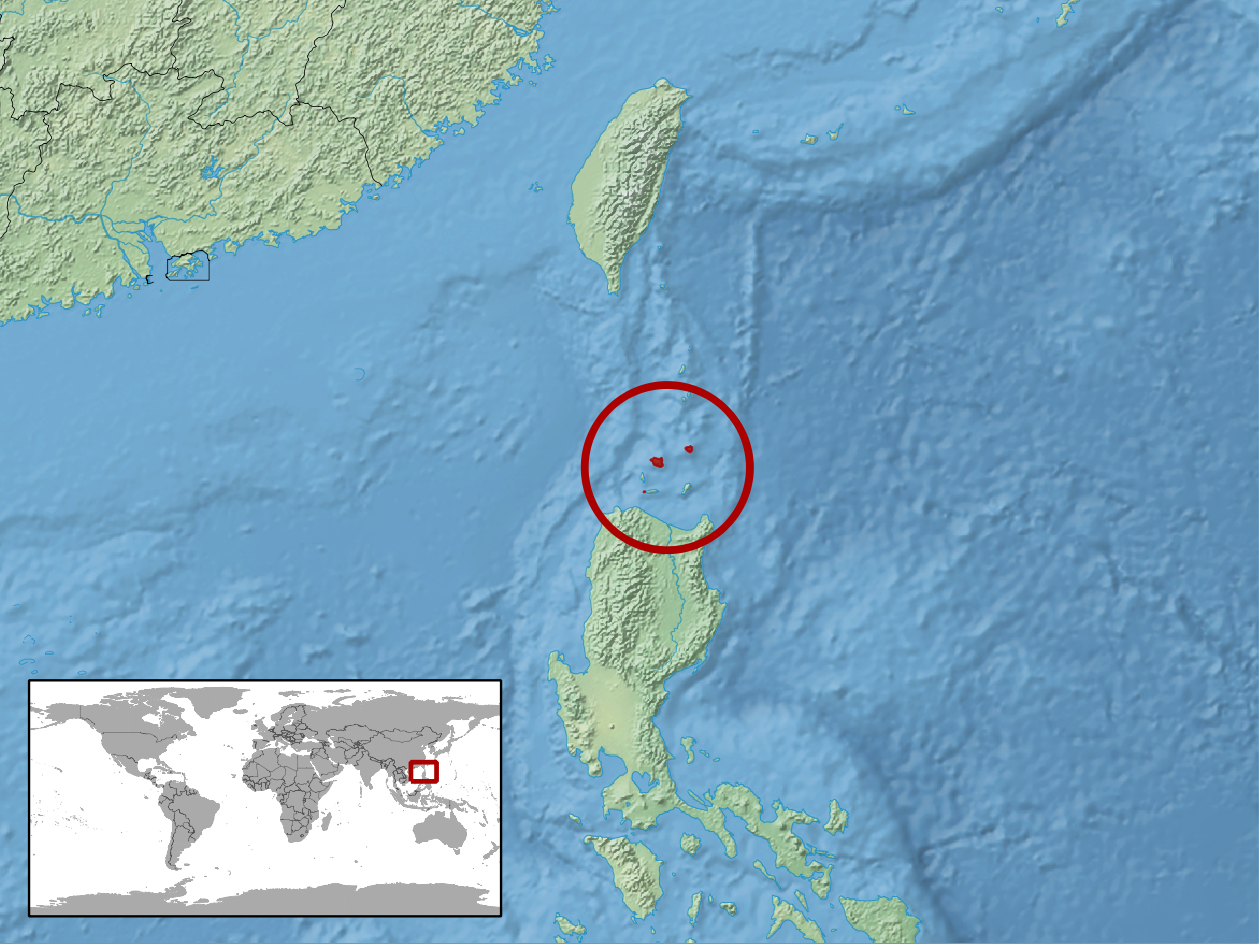

Species of lizard

Luperosaurus macgregori, known commonly as MacGregor's wolf gecko or McGregor's flapped-legged gecko, is a species of gecko, a lizard in the family Gekkonidae. The species is endemic to the Philippines.

== Etymology ==
The specific name, macgregori, is in honor of Richard C. MacGregor of the Science Bureau in Manila, who collected the holotype.

== Geographic range ==
L. macgregori is found in the Calayan Islands in the Philippines.

== Reproduction ==
L. macgregori is oviparous.
