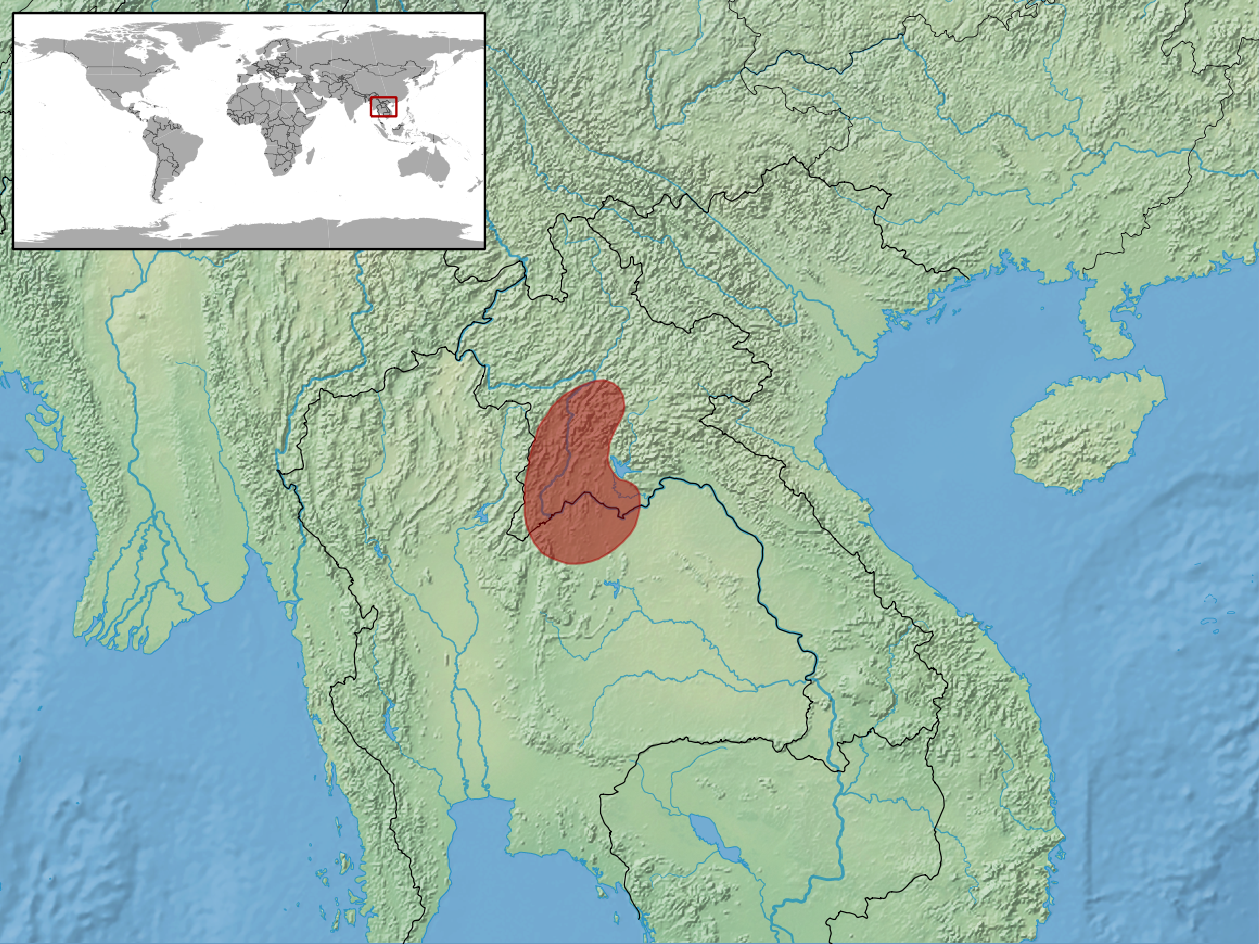
- Tropidophorus laotus distribution

Conservation status
- Endangered (IUCN 3.1)

Scientific classification
- Kingdom: Animalia
- Phylum: Chordata
- Class: Reptilia
- Order: Squamata
- Family: Scincidae
- Genus: Tropidophorus
- Species: T. laotus

Binomial name
- Tropidophorus laotus Smith, 1923

= Tropidophorus laotus =

Species of lizard

Tropidophorus laotus, the Laotian water skink or Laotian keeled skink, is a species of skink found in Laos and Thailand.
