= Tropidophorus beccarii =

Conservation status
- Least Concern (IUCN 3.1)

Scientific classification
- Kingdom: Animalia
- Phylum: Chordata
- Class: Reptilia
- Order: Squamata
- Family: Scincidae
- Genus: Tropidophorus
- Species: T. beccarii

Binomial name
- Tropidophorus beccarii W. Peters, 1871

Synonyms
- Tropidophorus (Amphixestus) beccarii W. Peters, 1871; Norbea beccarii — Mittleman, 1952; Tropidophorus beccarii — Manthey, 1983; Sphenomorphus aquaticus Malkmus, 1991; Tropidophorus beccarii — Manthey & Grossman, 1997

Species of lizard

Tropidophorus beccarii, also known commonly as Beccari's keeled skink and Beccari's water skink, is a species of lizard in the subfamily Lygosominae of the family Scincidae. The species is endemic to the island of Borneo.

== Etymology ==
The specific name, beccarii, is in honor of Italian botanist Odoardo Beccari.

== Geographic range ==
On the island of Borneo, T. beccarii is found in Brunei, northern Kalimantan (Indonesia), Sabah, and Sarawak (Malaysia).

== Habitat ==
The preferred natural habitats of T. beccarii are forest and freshwater wetlands, at altitudes from sea level to 1,000 m (3,300 ft).

== Description ==
Dorsally, T. beccarii is reddish brown, with dark brown crossbands. The flanks have whitish spots. Ventrally, it is yellowish.

T. beccarii may attain a snout to vent length (SVL) of 9.8 cm (3.9 in). The largest specimen measured by Boulenger had an SVL of 8 cm (3.1 in), and a tail length of 10.6 cm (4.2 in).

== Diet ==
T. beccarii preys upon water insects.

== Reproduction ==
T. beccarii is viviparous. Average litter size is four.
