= Cnemaspis otai =

Conservation status
- Vulnerable (IUCN 3.1)

Scientific classification
- Kingdom: Animalia
- Phylum: Chordata
- Class: Reptilia
- Order: Squamata
- Suborder: Gekkota
- Family: Gekkonidae
- Genus: Cnemaspis
- Species: C. otai

Binomial name
- Cnemaspis otai Das & Bauer, 2000

Species of lizard

Cnemaspis otai, also known commonly as Ota's day gecko, Ota's rock gecko, and the Vellore day gecko, is a species of lizard in the family Gekkonidae. The species is endemic to southeastern India.

== Etymology ==
The specific name, otai, is in honor of Japanese herpetologist Hidetoshi Ota (born 1959).

== Geographic distribution ==
Cnemaspis otai is found in the southern Eastern Ghats in the Indian state of Tamil Nadu.

The type locality is "Vellore Fort, Vellore, North Arcot District, Tamil Nadu, India".

== Habitat ==
The preferred natural habitat of Cnemaspis otai is forest at altitudes of 200–225 m (656–738 ft).

== Description ==
Cnemaspis otai may attain a snout-to-vent length (SVL) of 3 cm (1.2 in). Dorsally, it is grayish brown with black spots. Ventrally, it is yellowish cream.

== Behavior ==
Cnemaspis otai is diurnal and rock-dwelling.

== Reproduction ==
Cnemaspis otai is oviparous.
