= Luperosaurus cumingii =

Conservation status
- Data Deficient (IUCN 3.1)

Scientific classification
- Kingdom: Animalia
- Phylum: Chordata
- Class: Reptilia
- Order: Squamata
- Suborder: Gekkota
- Family: Gekkonidae
- Genus: Luperosaurus
- Species: L. cumingii

Binomial name
- Luperosaurus cumingii Gray, 1845
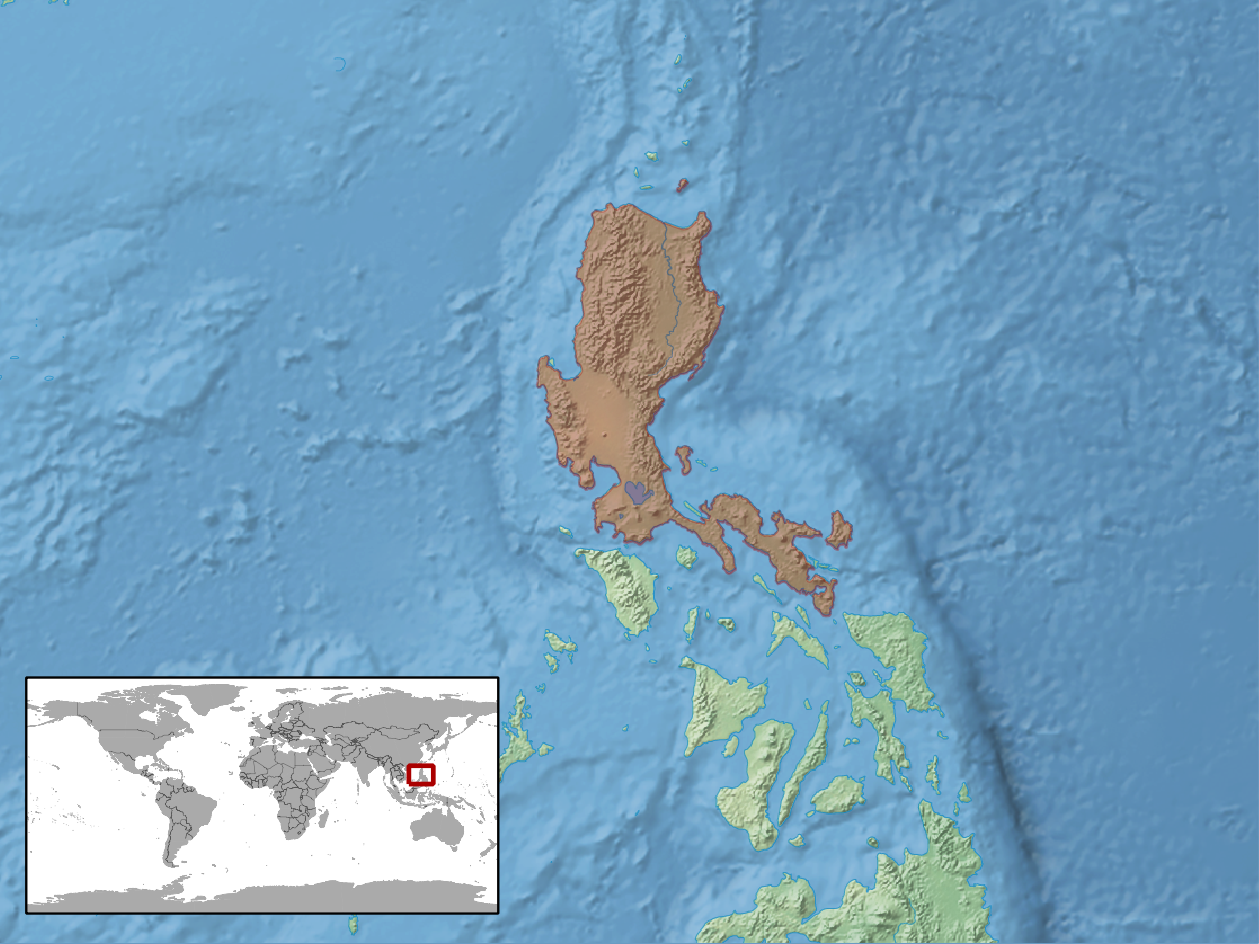

Species of lizard

Luperosaurus cumingii, also known commonly as Cuming's flapped-legged gecko and the Philippine wolf gecko, is a species of lizard in the family Gekkonidae. The species is endemic to southern Luzon in the Philippines.

== Etymology ==
The specific name, cumingii, is in honor of English naturalist Hugh Cuming.

== Habitat ==
The preferred natural habitat of Luperosaurus cumingii is forest, at altitudes from sea level to 700 m (2,300 ft).

== Behavior ==
Luperosaurus cumingii is arboreal, living in the forest canopy.

== Reproduction ==
Luperosaurus cumingii is oviparous.
