= Pak Djoko's flap-legged gecko =

Conservation status
- Data Deficient (IUCN 3.1)

Scientific classification
- Kingdom: Animalia
- Phylum: Chordata
- Class: Reptilia
- Order: Squamata
- Suborder: Gekkota
- Family: Gekkonidae
- Genus: Gekko
- Species: G. iskandari

Binomial name
- Gekko iskandari (R. Brown, Supriatna & Ota, 2000)
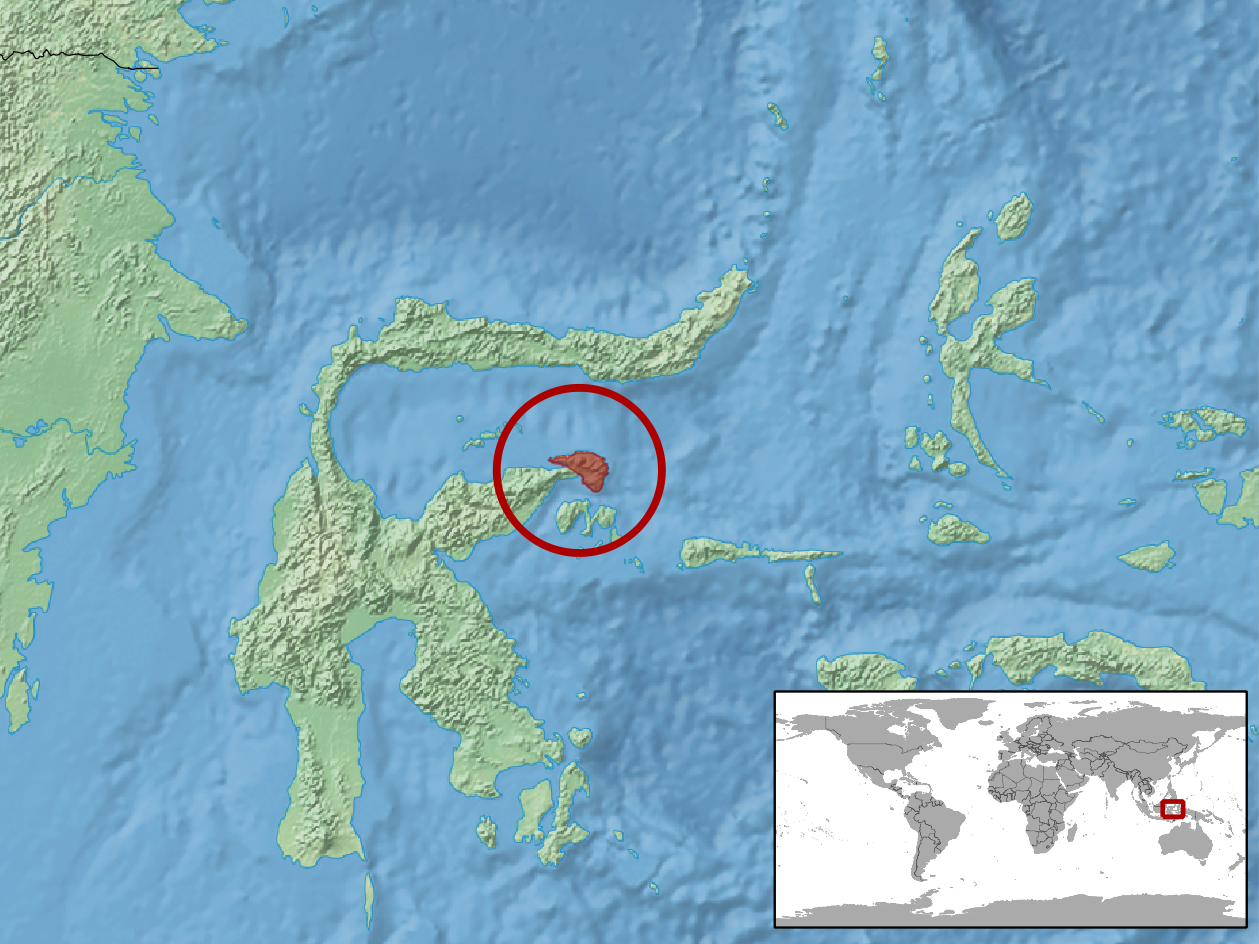

Synonyms
- Luperosaurus iskandari R. Brown, Supriatna & Ota, 2000; Gekko iskandari — R. Brown et al., 2012; Gekko (Sundagekko) iskandari — Wood et al., 2019; Gekko (Lomatodactylus) iskandari — Wood et al., 2020

Species of lizard

Pak Djoko's flap-legged gecko (Gekko iskandari), also known commonly as Iskandar's wolf gecko, is a species of gecko, a lizard in the family Gekkonidae. The species is endemic to Sulawesi.

== Etymology ==
The specific name, iskandari, is in honour of Indonesian herpetologist Djoko Tjahono Iskandar.

== Habitat ==
The preferred natural habitat of G. iskandari is forest.

== Behavior ==
G. iskandar is arboreal, living high in the forest canopy.

== Reproduction ==
G. iskandari is oviparous.
