= Luperosaurus angliit =

Conservation status
- Data Deficient (IUCN 3.1)

Scientific classification
- Kingdom: Animalia
- Phylum: Chordata
- Class: Reptilia
- Order: Squamata
- Suborder: Gekkota
- Family: Gekkonidae
- Genus: Luperosaurus
- Species: L. angliit

Binomial name
- Luperosaurus angliit Brown, Diesmos & Oliveros, 2011

Species of lizard

Luperosaurus angliit is a species of flap-legged gecko. It is endemic to Luzon in the Philippines.
