= Tropidophorus perplexus =

Conservation status
- Least Concern (IUCN 3.1)

Scientific classification
- Kingdom: Animalia
- Phylum: Chordata
- Class: Reptilia
- Order: Squamata
- Family: Scincidae
- Genus: Tropidophorus
- Species: T. perplexus

Binomial name
- Tropidophorus perplexus Barbour, 1921

Species of lizard

Tropidophorus perplexus is a species of skink, described by Thomas Barbour in 1921 from Borneo.
