= Tropidophorus davaoensis =

Conservation status
- Least Concern (IUCN 3.1)

Scientific classification
- Kingdom: Animalia
- Phylum: Chordata
- Class: Reptilia
- Order: Squamata
- Family: Scincidae
- Genus: Tropidophorus
- Species: T. davaoensis

Binomial name
- Tropidophorus davaoensis Bacon, 1980
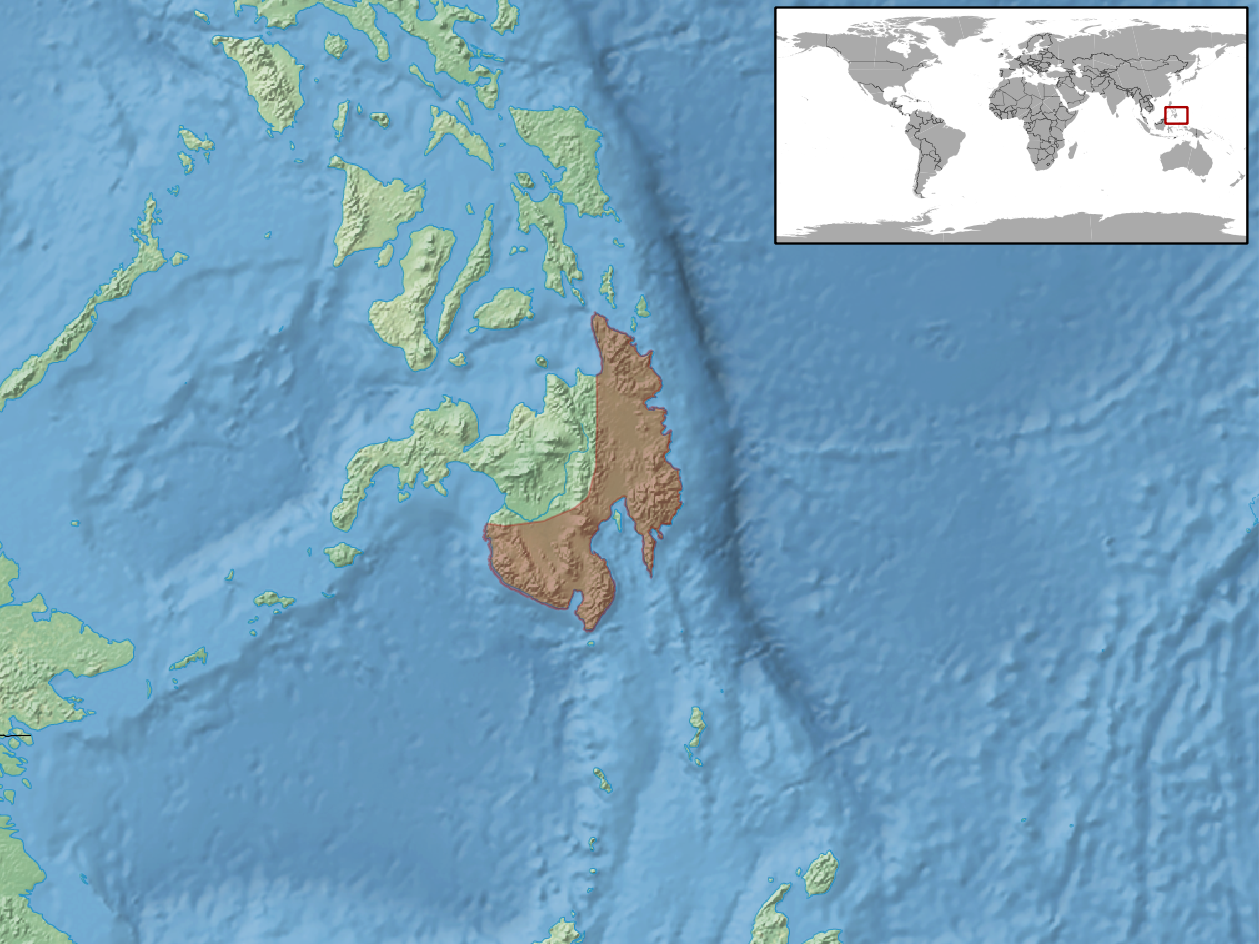
- Distribution in Mindanao, the Philippines

Species of lizard

Tropidophorus davaoensis, also known as the Davao waterside skink, is a species of skink. It is endemic to Mindanao, the Philippines.
