= Tropidophorus micropus =

Conservation status
- Data Deficient (IUCN 3.1)

Scientific classification
- Kingdom: Animalia
- Phylum: Chordata
- Class: Reptilia
- Order: Squamata
- Family: Scincidae
- Genus: Tropidophorus
- Species: T. micropus

Binomial name
- Tropidophorus micropus Lidth de Jeude, 1905

Species of lizard

Tropidophorus micropus is a species of skink found in Indonesia and Malaysia.
