= Tropidophorus hainanus =

Conservation status
- Least Concern (IUCN 3.1)

Scientific classification
- Kingdom: Animalia
- Phylum: Chordata
- Class: Reptilia
- Order: Squamata
- Family: Scincidae
- Genus: Tropidophorus
- Species: T. hainanus

Binomial name
- Tropidophorus hainanus Smith, 1923

Species of lizard

Tropidophorus hainanus, the Hainan water skink, is a species of skink found in China and Vietnam.
