= Brooks's wolf gecko =

Conservation status
- Near Threatened (IUCN 3.1)

Scientific classification
- Kingdom: Animalia
- Phylum: Chordata
- Class: Reptilia
- Order: Squamata
- Suborder: Gekkota
- Family: Gekkonidae
- Genus: Luperosaurus
- Species: L. brooksii

Binomial name
- Luperosaurus brooksii (Boulenger, 1920)

Synonyms
- Gekko brooksii Boulenger, 1920; Gekko (Lomatodactylus) brooksii — Wood et al., 2020

Species of lizard

Brooks's wolf gecko (Luperosaurus brooksii) is a species of lizard in the family Gekkonidae. The species is endemic to Sumatra.

== Etymology ==
The specific name, brooksii, is in honor of British metallurgical chemist Cecil Joslin Brooks, who collected natural history specimens in Borneo and Sumatra.

== Habitat ==
The preferred natural habitat of L. brooksii is forest.

== Behavior ==
L. brooksii is arboreal, living in the forest canopy.

== Reproduction ==
L. brooksii is oviparous.
