= Luperosaurus palawanensis =

Conservation status
- Data Deficient (IUCN 3.1)

Scientific classification
- Kingdom: Animalia
- Phylum: Chordata
- Class: Reptilia
- Order: Squamata
- Suborder: Gekkota
- Family: Gekkonidae
- Genus: Luperosaurus
- Species: L. palawanensis

Binomial name
- Luperosaurus palawanensis Brown & Alcala, 1978
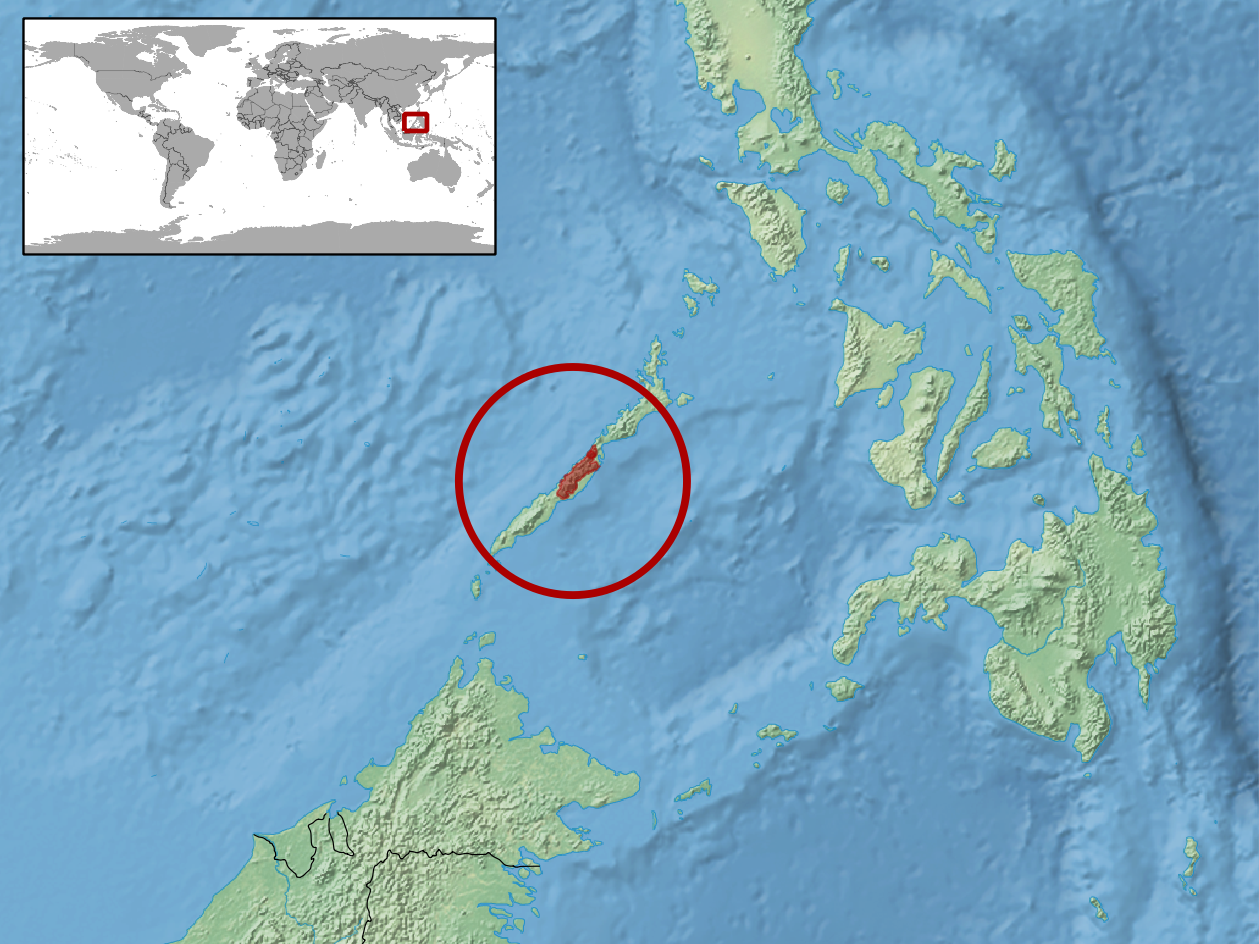

Species of lizard

Luperosaurus palawanensis, also known as Palawan wolf gecko or Palawan flapped-legged gecko, is a species of gecko. It is endemic to Palawan in the Philippines.
