= Hidetoshi Ota =

Japanese herpetologist (born 1959)

Hidetoshi Ōta
- 太田 英利
- Born: September 25, 1959 (age 66)
- Known for: Diversity and biogeography of reptiles in East Asian and West Oceanian islands
- Scientific career
- Fields: Herpetology
- Institutions: University of the Ryukyus; University of Hyōgo
- Author abbrev. (zoology): Ota

Hidetoshi Ōta (Japanese: 太田 英利, born 25 September 1959) is a Japanese herpetologist.

== Career ==
From January 1989 to March 2009, Ōta worked as a professor at the University of the Ryukyus, where he was based at the Tropical Biosphere Research Center. Since April 2009, he has been professor at the Institute of Natural and Environmental Sciences (INES) at the University of Hyōgo. He serves as a member of the Executive Council of the Herpetological Society of Japan.

In 2000, Ōta received the Zoological Society of Japan’s Encouragement Prize for his research on “Reptilian diversity and biogeography of tropical and subtropical islands in East Asia and West Oceania”.

== Species described ==
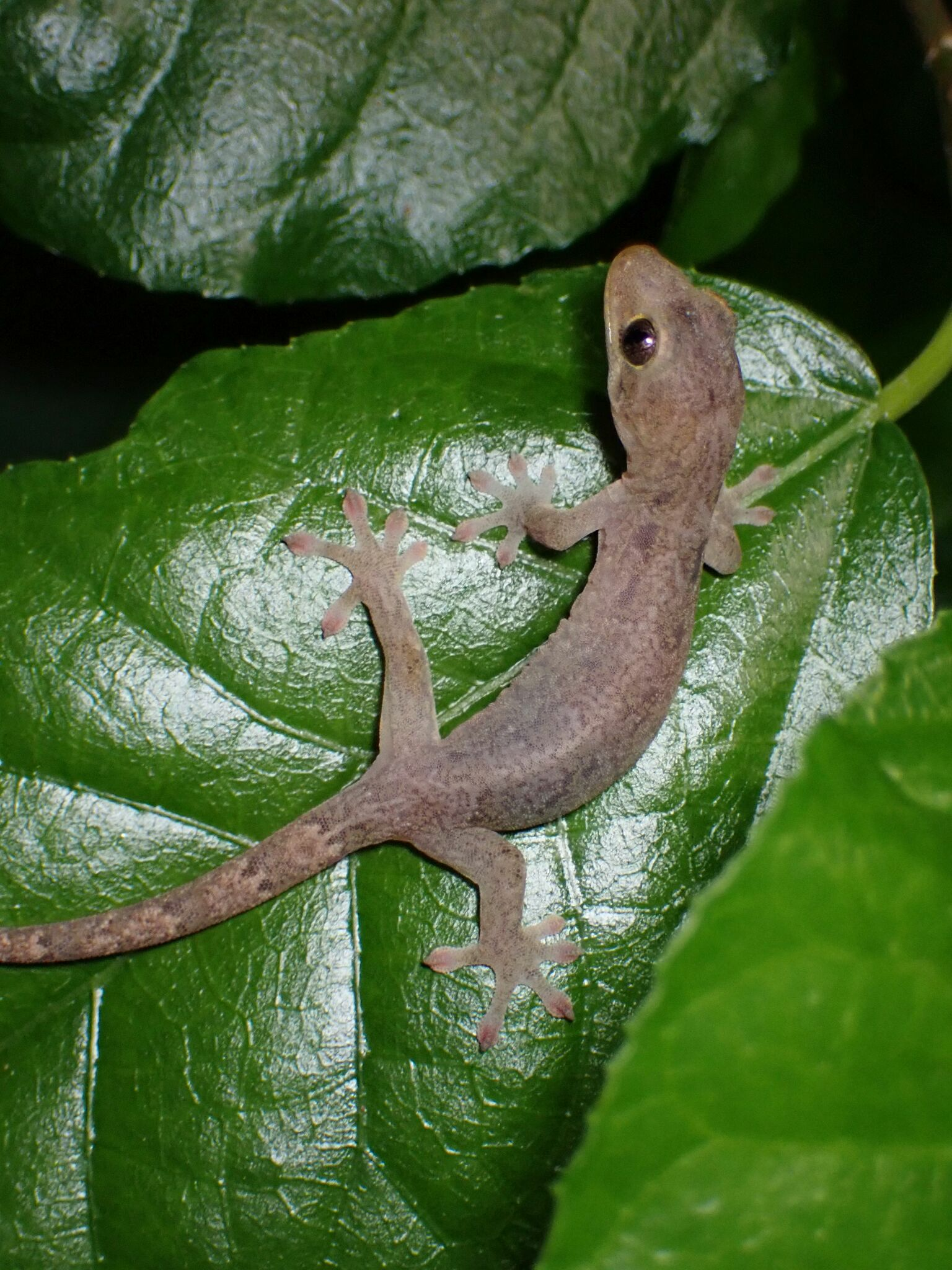
Lepidodactylus vanuatuensis, described by Ōta and colleagues, is endemic to Vanuatu.

Ōta has been involved in the description of numerous species and subspecies of reptiles. These include:

- Achalinus formosanus chigirai (1989)
- Complicitus nigrigularis (1991)
- Cyrtodactylus hamidyi (2021)
- Dibamus kondaoensis (2001)
- Dibamus somsaki (1997)
- Diploderma luei (1998)
- Diploderma makii (1989)
- Gekko iskandari (2000)
- Gekko shibatai (2008)
- Gekko vertebralis (2008)
- Goniurosaurus sengokui (2017)
- Goniurosaurus toyamai (1994)
- Hemidactylus stejnegeri (1989)
- Lepidodactylus balioburius (1989)
- Lepidodactylus paurolepis (1995)
- Lepidodactylus ranauensis (1988)
- Lepidodactylus vanuatuensis (1998)
- Lepidodactylus yami (1987)
- Luperosaurus yasumai (1996)
- Lycodon alcalai (1994)
- Lycodon bibonius (1994)
- Lycodon chrysoprateros (1994)
- Lycodon solivagus (1994)
- Plestiodon takarai (2017)
- Scincella dunan (2022)
- Takydromus toyamai (1996)
- Tropidophorus baconi (2003)
- Tropidophorus latiscutatus (2002)
- Tropidophorus matsuii (2002)
- Tropidophorus murphyi (2002)

== Eponyms ==
Several species have been named in honor of Ōta.

- Buergeria otai Wang et al., 2018
- Cnemaspis otai Das & Bauer, 2000
- Cristidorsa otai (Mahony, 2009)
- Cyrtodactylus otai Nguyen et al., 2015

Nota bene: A binomial authority in parentheses indicates the species was originally described in a different genus.

== Selected publications ==
- Ōta, H. (editor) (1999). Tropical Island Herpetofauna: Origin, Current Diversity, and Conservation. Amsterdam: Elsevier Science Ltd. 353 pp. ISBN 978-0444501950.
