= Luperosaurus joloensis =

Conservation status
- Data Deficient (IUCN 3.1)

Scientific classification
- Kingdom: Animalia
- Phylum: Chordata
- Class: Reptilia
- Order: Squamata
- Suborder: Gekkota
- Family: Gekkonidae
- Genus: Luperosaurus
- Species: L. joloensis

Binomial name
- Luperosaurus joloensis Taylor, 1918
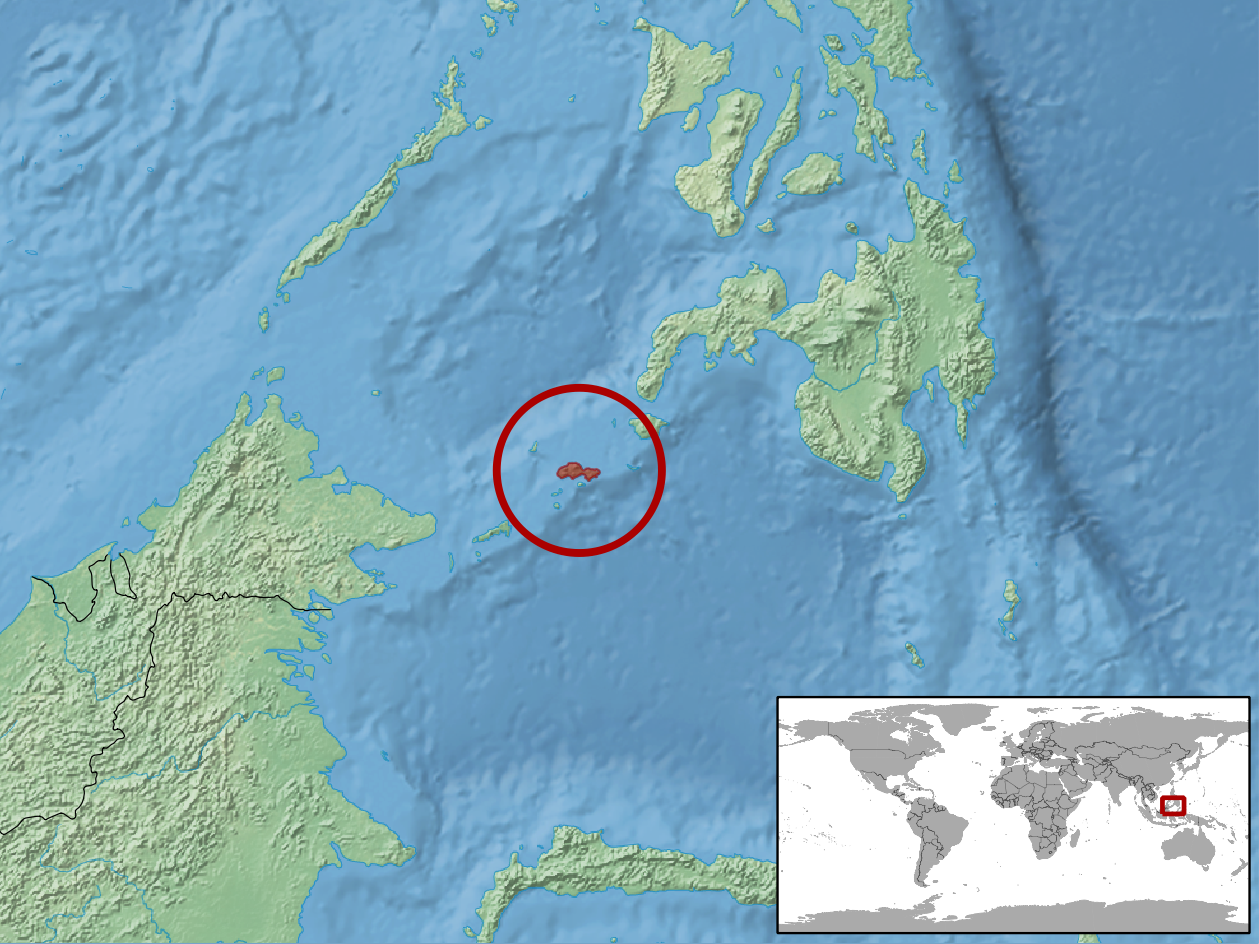

Species of lizard

Luperosaurus joloensis, also known commonly as the Jolo flapped-legged gecko and Taylor's wolf gecko, is a species of lizard in the family Gekkonidae. The species is endemic to Jolo in the Philippines.

== Habitat ==
The preferred natural habitat of L. joloensis is forest.

== Reproduction ==
L. joloensis is oviparous.
