= Tsutomu Hikida =

Japanese herpetologist (born 1951)

- 疋田 努
- Born: 1951 (age 74–75); Usuki, Ōita Prefecture, Japan
- Education: Kyoto University
- Known for: Research on reptiles and amphibians
- Scientific career
- Fields: Zoology, Herpetology
- Workplaces: Kyoto University

Tsutomu Hikida (Japanese: 疋田 努, born 1951) is a Japanese zoologist and herpetologist. He is an emeritus professor at Kyoto University, known for his extensive research in herpetology, particularly the systematics, taxonomy, and biogeography of reptiles and amphibians.

He has served as president of the Herpetological Society of Japan and as chairman of its Committee on Standard Japanese Names.

== Biography ==
Hikida was born in Usuki, Ōita Prefecture, Japan, in 1951. He graduated from the Faculty of Science, Kyoto University, in 1974, and completed coursework for the doctoral program at the Graduate School of Science, Kyoto University, in 1979 without submitting a dissertation.

From 1979 to 1995, he served as an assistant in the Department of Biological Sciences, Graduate School of Science, Kyoto University. He was later promoted to associate professor and then full professor, retiring from Kyoto University in 2016.

== Research and career ==
Hikida developed a fascination with nature from an early age, often collecting small animals and insects as a child. As an undergraduate, he studied ecology, with his graduation thesis focusing on age estimation in wood mice (Apodemus speciosus) based on their teeth. Upon entering graduate school, he shifted his focus to the phylogeny of reptiles. Since then, his research has centered on the systematics, taxonomy, and biogeography of reptiles.

== Selected works ==
- (Coauthor) Natural Monuments of the World, Vol. 9: Amphibians and Reptiles. Kodansha, 1987. ISBN 406191359X.
- (Coauthor) Animal Systematics and Taxonomy, Vol. 9 (Part IIb1): Reptiles I. Nakayama Shoten, 1988. ISBN 4521071910.
- (Coauthor) Current Herpetology in East Asia. Herpetological Society of Japan, 1989.
- Evolution of Reptiles. University of Tokyo Press, 2002. ISBN 4-13-060179-2.
- (Coauthor) Encyclopedia of Japanese Animals, Vol. 5: Amphibians, Reptiles, and Cartilaginous Fishes. Heibonsha, 1996. ISBN 4582545556.
- (Coauthor) Amphibians and Reptiles (Shogakukan Illustrated NEO Series). Shogakukan, 2004. ISBN 4092172060.
- The Great Illustrated Book of Lizards, Snakes, and Turtles. PHP Institute, 2012. ISBN 4569782523.
