= List of reptiles of Thailand =

The following is a list of reptiles of Thailand. There are more than 400 species recorded.

== Order Crocodylia (crocodilians) ==
Scientific name	Family	Common name	Synonyms	Thai name	Geographical range
Crocodylus porosus	Crocodylidae	Saltwater crocodile		จระเข้น้ำเค็ม	South
Crocodylus siamensis	Crocodylidae	Siamese crocodile		จระเข้น้ำจืด	West and southeast
Tomistoma schlegelii	Crocodylidae	Sunda gharial	Malayan false gharial	ตะโขง	Extreme south - Probably extinct

== Order Testudines (turtles) ==
Scientific name	Family	Common name	Synonyms	Thai name	Geographical range
Platysternon megacephalum	Platysternidae	Big-headed turtle		เต่าปูลู	Northwest and west
Dermochelys coriacea	Dermochelyidae	Leatherback sea turtle		เต่ามะเฟือง	Andaman Sea and Gulf coast
Trachemys scripta elegans	Emydidae	Red-eared slider		เต่าหูแดง	Widespread - introduced
Chelonia mydas	Cheloniidae	Green sea turtle		เต่าตนุ	Andaman Sea and Gulf coast
Lepidochelys olivacea	Cheloniidae	Olive ridley turtle		เต่าหญ้า	Andaman Sea and Gulf coast
Caretta caretta	Cheloniidae	Loggerhead turtle		เต่าหัวค้อน	Andaman Sea and Gulf coast
Eretmochelys imbricata	Cheloniidae	Hawksbill sea turtle		เต่ากระ	Andaman Sea and Gulf coast
Amyda cartilaginea	Trionychidae	Asian softshell turtle		ตะพาบสวน	Widespread
Pelodiscus sinensis	Trionychidae	Chinese softshell turtle		ตะพาบไต้หวัน	Widespread - introduced
Chitra chitra	Trionychidae	Narrow-headed softshell turtle		ตะพาบม่านลายไทย	West
Chitra vandijki	Trionychidae	Myanmar narrow-headed softshell turtle		ตะพาบม่านลายพม่า	West
Dogania subplana	Trionychidae	Hillstream softshell turtle	Malayan softshell turtle	ตะพาบแก้มแดง	West and south
Caracape cantorii	Trionychidae	Frog-headed giant softshell turtle	Cantor’s giant softshell turtle	ตะพาบหัวกบ	Northeast, west, central and south
Batagur baska	Geoemydidae	Mangrove terrapin	Northern river terrapin	เต่ากะอานถิ่นเหนือ	South (Ranong, Pattani, and Satun)
Batagur borneoensis	Geoemydidae	Painted terrapin		เต่าลายตีนเป็ด	Central and south
Cuora amboinensis	Geoemydidae	Asian box turtle	Keeled box turtle, Indian black turtle, Malayan box turtle	เต่าหับ	Widespread
Cyclemys dentata	Geoemydidae	Asian leaf turtle		เต่าใบไม้	South
Cyclemys oldhamii	Geoemydidae	Black-striped leaf turtle	Oldham's leaf turtle	เต่าห้วยท้องดำ	Widespread
Cyclemys enigmatica	Geoemydidae	Dark leaf turtle		เต่าใบไม้มลายู	Extreme south
Cyclemys atripons	Geoemydidae	Black-bridged leaf turtle		เต่าห้วยเขาบรรทัด	Southeast
Heosemys grandis	Geoemydidae	Giant Asian pond turtle		เต่าบ้าน	West and south
Heosemys spinosa	Geoemydidae	Spiny turtle	Spiny Terrapin	เต่าจักร	Peninsula
Heosemys annandalii	Geoemydidae	Yellow-headed temple turtle		เต่าบึงหัวเหลือง	Central and peninsula
Malayemys macrocephala	Geoemydidae	Malayan snail-eating turtle		เต่านาหัวใหญ่	Widespread except northeast
Malayemys khoratensis	Geoemydidae	Khorat snail-eating turtle		เต่าสามซ้อน	Northeastern (Khorat Basin)
Malayemys isan	Geoemydidae	Isan snail-eating turtle		เต่านาอีสาน	Northeastern (Nong Bua Lamphu)
Notochelys platynota	Geoemydidae	Flat-shelled turtle	Malayan flat-shelled turtle	เต่าทับทิม	South
Siebenrockiella crassicollis	Geoemydidae	Black pond turtle	Black marsh turtle	เต่าดำ	Widespread
Indotestudo elongata	Testudinidae	Elongated tortoise		เต่าเหลือง	Widespread
Manouria emys	Testudinidae	Asian brown tortoise	Asian giant tortoise	เต่าหก	West and south
Manouria impressa	Testudinidae	Impressed tortoise		เต่าเดือย	Peninsula

== Order Squamata, Suborder Lacertilia (lizards) ==
Scientific name	Family	Common name	Synonyms	Thai name	Geographical range
Aeluroscalabotes felinus	Eublepharidae	Cat gecko	Malaysian cat gecko	ตุ๊กแกป่าหัวโต	South (Narathiwat, Satun, and Yala)
Cyrtodactylus brevipalmatus	Gekkonidae	Web-footed bent-toed gecko	Short-palmed bent-toed gecko	ตุ๊กกายโคนนิ้วติด	West and south - endemic
Cyrtodactylus interdigitalis	Gekkonidae	Ulber's bent-toed gecko	Nam Nao bent-toed gecko	ตุ๊กกายน้ำหนาว	Northeast - endemic
Cyrtodactylus consobrinus	Gekkonidae	Peter's bent-toed gecko		ตุ๊กกายมลายู	South (Narathiwat, Satun, and Yala)
Cyrtodactylus saiyok	Gekkonidae	Sai Yok bent-toed gecko		ตุ๊กกายไทรโยค	West (Kanchanaburi) - endemic
Cyrtodactylus sanook	Gekkonidae	Sanook bent-toed gecko		ตุ๊กกายสนุก	South (Chumphon)
Cyrtodactylus intermedius	Gekkonidae	Intermediate banded bent-toed gecko	Cardamom Mountains bent-toed gecko	ตุ๊กแกป่าตะวันออก	Southeast
Cyrtodactylus jarujini	Gekkonidae	Jarujin's bent-toed gecko		ตุ๊กกายจารุจินต์	Northeast
Cyrtodactylus inthanon	Gekkonidae	Doi Inthanon bent-toed gecko		ตุ๊กกายอินทนนท์	North (Chiang Mai)
Cyrtodactylus kunyai	Gekkonidae	Kunya's bent-toed gecko		ตุ๊กกายผาหินงาม	Northeast (Loei)
Cyrtodactylus ranongensis	Gekkonidae	Ranong bent-toed gecko		ตุ๊กกายระนอง	South (Ranong)
Cyrtodactylus angularis	Gekkonidae	Angular-spotted bent-toed gecko	Angled bent-toed gecko	ตุ๊กแกป่าดงพญาเย็น	Central and northeast - endemic
Cyrtodactylus papilionoides	Gekkonidae	Butterfly bent-toed gecko		ตุ๊กกายลายผีเสื้อ	Central and northeast
Cyrtodactylus lekaguli	Gekkonidae	Lekagul's bent-toed gecko		ตุ๊กกายหมอบุญส่ง	South
Cyrtodactylus quadrivirigatus	Gekkonidae	Four-lined bent-toed gecko	Four-striped bent-toed gecko	ตุ๊กกายลายสี่ขีด	South
Cyrtodactylus oldhami	Gekkonidae	Oldham's bent-toed gecko		ตุ๊กกายคอขวั้น	West and south
Cyrtodactylus phetchaburiensis	Gekkonidae	Phetchaburi bent-toed gecko		ตุ๊กกายเพชรบุรี	Northern Peninsula (Phetchaburi) - endemic
Cyrtodactylus zebraicus	Gekkonidae	Spotted bent-toed gecko	Thai ocelot gecko	ตุ๊กแกป่าลายจุด	West and south
Cyrtodactylus variegatus	Gekkonidae	Variegated bent-toed gecko			West
Cyrtodactylus doisuthep	Gekkonidae	Doi Suthep bent-toed gecko			North (Chiang Mai) - endemic
Cyrtodactylus sumonthai	Gekkonidae	Sumontha's cave gecko	Sumontha's bent-toed gecko		Southeast (Rayong) - endemic
Cyrtodactylus thirakhupti	Gekkonidae	Thirakhupt's cave gecko	Thirakhupt's bent-toed gecko		South (Surat Thani) - endemic
Cyrtodactylus chanhomeae	Gekkonidae	Chanhome's cave gecko	Chanhome's bent-toed gecko		Central (Saraburi) - endemic
Cyrtodactylus tigroides	Gekkonidae	Tiger cave gecko	Striped bent-toed gecko		West (Kanchanaburi) - endemic
Cyrtodactylus auribalteatus	Gekkonidae	Golden-belted bent-toed gecko			Central
Cyrtodactylus surin	Gekkonidae	Surin bent-toed gecko			South (Mu Ko Surin)
Cyrtodactylus wangkulangkulae	Gekkonidae	Wangkulangkul's bent-toed gecko			South (Satun)
Cyrtodactylus dumnuii	Gekkonidae	Dumnui's bent-toed gecko			North (Chiang Mai)
Cyrtodactylus astrum	Gekkonidae	Starry bent-toed gecko			South
Cyrtodactylus erythrops	Gekkonidae	Red-eyed bent-toed gecko			North (Mae Hong Son)
Cyrtodactylus khelangensis	Gekkonidae	Lampang bent-toed gecko			North (Lampang) - endemic
Cyrtodactylus samroiyot	Gekkonidae	Sam Roi Yot bent-toed gecko			West (Prachuap Khiri Khan) - endemic
Cyrtodactylus macrotuberculatus	Gekkonidae	Tuberculate bent-toed gecko			Extreme south - endemic
Cyrtodactylus phuketensis	Gekkonidae	Phuket bent-toed gecko			South (Phuket) - endemic
Cnemaspis siamensis	Gekkonidae	Siamese rock gecko	Thai day gecko		Peninsula (Phetchaburi to Phang Nga) - endemic
Cnemaspis chanardi	Gekkonidae	Chan-ard's rock gecko			South (Surat Thani to Krabi and Satun) - endemic
Cnemaspis vandeventeri	Gekkonidae	Van Deventer's rock gecko			South (Ranong, Phang Nga, and Phuket) - endemic
Cnemaspis kamolnorranathi	Gekkonidae	Kamolnorranath's rock gecko			South (Surat Thani) - endemic
Cnemaspis huaseesom	Gekkonidae	Yellow-headed rock gecko			West (Kanchanaburi) - endemic
Cnemaspis punctatonuchalis	Gekkonidae	Spot-neck rock gecko			West (Prachuap Khiri Khan) - endemic
Cnemaspis biocellata	Gekkonidae	Two-eyed rock gecko	Two-eyed day gecko, twin-spot day gecko		South (Satun)
Cnemaspis chanthaburiensis	Gekkonidae	Chanthaburi rock gecko	Chanthaburi day gecko		Southeast (Chantaburi and Chonburi)
Cnemaspis flavolineatus	Gekkonidae	Titi Wangsa rock gecko			Extreme south
Cnemaspis narathiwatensis	Gekkonidae	Malayan rock gecko			South (Narathiwat and Yala)
Cnemaspis niyomwanae	Gekkonidae	Niyomwan's rock gecko			South (Trang and Satun) - endemic
Cnemaspis sp. nov.	Gekkonidae				South (Ranong)
Cnemaspis flavolineata	Gekkonidae	Striped rock gecko			Extreme south
Cnemaspis kumpoli	Gekkonidae	Kumpol's rock gecko	Kimpol's day gecko		South
Cnemaspis phuketensis	Gekkonidae	Phuket rock gecko	Phuket day gecko		South (Phuket)
Dixonius siamensis	Gekkonidae	Siamese ground gecko	Spotted ground gecko		Widespread
Dixonius sp. nov.	Gekkonidae				West (Prachuap Khiri Khan) - endemic
Dixonius melanostictus	Gekkonidae	Black-sided ground gecko	Dark-sided ground gecko		Central
Dixonius hangseesom	Gekkonidae	Orange-tailed ground gecko			West (Kanchanaburi) - endemic
Hemidactylus frenatus	Gekkonidae	Spiny-tailed house gecko	Asian house gecko	จิ้งจกหางหนาม	Widespread
Hemidactylus garnotii	Gekkonidae	Garnot's house gecko		จิ้งจกหางเรียบ	Widespread
Hemidactylus platyurus	Gekkonidae	Common frilly gecko	Frilly house gecko	จิ้งจกหางแบนเล็ก	Widespread
Hemidactylus parvimaculatus	Gekkonidae	Sri Lankan house gecko			Central (Bangkok) - introduced
Hemidactylus brookii	Gekkonidae	Brooke's house gecko			South (Ranong)
Hemidactylus craspedotus	Gekkonidae	Malayan frilly gecko	Frilly forest gecko		South
Gehyra lacerata	Gekkonidae	Western four-clawed gecko	Kanchanaburi four-clawed gecko	จิ้งจกหินเมืองกาญจน์	West and northeast - endemic
Gehyra angusticaudata	Gekkonidae	Slender-tailed four-clawed gecko			Southeast (Chonburi) - endemic
Gehyra mutilata	Gekkonidae	Common four-clawed gecko		จิ้งจกหินสีจาง	Widespread
Gekko sp. nov.	Gekkonidae				Central (Phitsanulok)
Gehyra fehlmanni	Gekkonidae	Fehlmann's four-clawed gecko			West and central
Hemiphyllodactylus typus	Gekkonidae	Malayan dwarf gecko	Common worm gecko	จิ้งจกเขาสูงมลายู	South
Hemiphyllodactylus yunnanensis	Gekkonidae	Yunnan dwarf gecko	Yunnan worm gecko	จิ้งจกเขาสูงยูนนาน	North and south (Samui)
Hemiphyllodactylus chiangmaiensis	Gekkonidae	Chiang Mai dwarf gecko			North (Chiang Mai)
Gekko gecko	Gekkonidae	Common tokay gecko		ตุ๊กแกบ้าน	Widespread
Gekko monarchus	Gekkonidae	Spotted tokay gecko	Warty house gecko		South
Gekko nutaphandi	Gekkonidae	Nutaphand's gecko			West (Kanchanaburi) - endemic
Gekko petricolus	Gekkonidae	Sandstone gecko			Northeast
Gekko siamensis	Gekkonidae	Siamese tokay gecko	Siamese gecko		Central and northeast - endemic
Gekko smithii	Gekkonidae	Smith's tokay gecko	Smith's giant gecko		Peninsula
Gekko lauhachindai	Gekkonidae	Saraburi gecko			Central (Saraburi) - endemic
Ptychozoon lionotum	Gekkonidae	Common parachute gecko	Smooth parachute gecko	ตุ๊กแกบินหางหยัก	Widespread
Ptychozoon trinotaterra	Gekkonidae	Three-banded parachute gecko		ตุ๊กแกบินลายสามแถบ	Northeast
Ptychozoon kaengkrachanense	Gekkonidae	Kaeng Krachan parachute gecko			North (Chiang Mai) and west (Phetchaburi) - endemic
Ptychozoon kuhli	Gekkonidae	Kuhl's parachute gecko			South
Ptychozoon horsfieldii	Gekkonidae	Horsfield's parachute gecko			South (Yala)
Draco sumatranus	Agamidae	Sumatran gliding lizard	Common flying lizard		West and south
Draco maculatus	Agamidae	Orange-winged gliding lizard		กิ้งก่าปินปีกส้ม	Widespread
Draco fimbriatus	Agamidae	Orange-bearded gliding lizard	Fringed flying lizard		South
Draco formosus	Agamidae	Beautiful gliding lizard			Status uncertain
Draco quinquefasciatus	Agamidae	Five-banded gliding lizard			South
Draco haematopogon	Agamidae	Red-bearded gliding lizard			South (Ko Phangan)
Draco melanopogon	Agamidae	Black-bearded gliding lizard			South
Draco taeniopterus	Agamidae	Barred gliding lizard	Narrow-lined flying lizard	กิ้งก่าบินปีกลาย	Widespread
Draco blanfordii	Agamidae	Blanford's gliding lizard			Widespread
Draco obscurus	Agamidae	Dusky gliding lizard	Obscure flying lizard		South
Acanthosaura armata	Agamidae	Horned tree lizard			South (Surat Thani southward)
Acanthosaura cardamomensis	Agamidae	Cardamom Mountains spiny lizard			Northeast and southeast
Acanthosaura lepidogaster	Agamidae	Scale-bellied tree lizard	Scale-bellied spiny lizard		North
Acanthosaura crucigera	Agamidae	Cross-bearing tree lizard	Masked spiny lizard	กิ้งก่าเขาหนามสั้น	Widespread
Acanthosaura phuketensis	Agamidae	Phuket tree lizard			South (Ranong to Phuket)
Gonocephalus abbotti	Agamidae	Abbott's anglehead lizard			South
Gonocephalus bellii	Agamidae	Bell's anglehead lizard	Blue-necked angle-headed lizard		South
Gonocephalus grandis	Agamidae	Great anglehead lizard	Giant angle-headed lizard		South
Diploderma yunnanense	Agamidae	Yunnan Mountain lizard			North (Chiang Mai)
Bronchocela cristatella	Agamidae	Green crested lizard	Crested green lizard		West and south
Bronchocela smaragdina	Agamidae	Smaragdine crested lizard			Northeast (Nakhon Ratchasima) and southeast
Bronchocela rayaensis	Agamidae	Gunung Raya green-crested lizard			South
Pseudocalotes sp. nov.	Agamidae				West (Tak)
Pseudocalotes floweri	Agamidae	Flower's long-headed lizard			Southeast (Chanthaburi)
Pseudocalotes khaonanensis	Agamidae	Khao Nan long-headed lizard			South (Nakhon Sri Thammarat) - endemic
Pseudocalotes microlepis	Agamidae	Boulenger's long-headed lizard	Small-scaled long-headed lizard		North (Chiang Mai) and northeast
Pseudocalotes kakhienensis	Agamidae	Kakhyen Hills spiny lizard			North (Chiang Mai)
Calotes versicolor	Agamidae	Changeable crested lizard	Garden izard	กิ้งก่าหัวแดง, กิ้งก่ารั้ว	Widespread
Calotes mystaceus	Agamidae	Moustached crested lizard	Blue forest lizard	กิ้งก่าสวน, กิ้งก่าหัวสีฟ้า	Widespread
Calotes emma	Agamidae	Forest crested lizard		กิ้งก่าแก้วเหนือ	Widespread
Physignathus cocincinus	Agamidae	Indochinese water dragon		ตะกอง, ลั้ง	Northeast and southeast
Mantheyus phuwuanensis	Agamidae	Phu Wua lizard			Northeast (Bueng Kan) - endemic
Aphaniotis fuscus	Agamidae	Earless lizard	Brown scrub lizard		South (Pattani and Yala)
Leiolepis belliana	Agamidae	Common butterfly lizard	Bell's butterfly lizard, eyed butterfly lizard	แย้เส้น, แย้ธรรมดา	Widespread except northeast
Leiolepis boehmei	Agamidae	Boehm's butterfly lizard		แย้สงขลา	South (Nakhon Sri Thammarat and Songkhla) - endemic
Leiolepis rubritaeniata	Agamidae	Reeves' butterfly lizard	Red-banded butterfly lizard	แย้อีสาน	Northeast
Leiolepis triploida	Agamidae	Triploid butterfly lizard		แย้มลายู	South (Satun and Songkhla)
Takydromus sexlineatus	Lacertidae	Long-tailed lizard	Long-tailed grass lizard	กิ้งก่าน้อยหางยาว, จิ้งเหลนน้อยหางยาว, งูคา, สางห่า	Widespread
Eutropis multifasciata	Scincidae	Many-lined sun skink	Common sun skink	จิ้งเหลนบ้าน	Widespread
Eutropis longicaudata	Scincidae	Long-tailed sun skink		จิ้งเหลนหางยาว	Widespread
Eutropis novemcarinata	Scincidae	Keeled sun skink	Nine-keeled ground skink		South
Eutropis rugifera	Scincidae	Nicobar sun skink	Red-throated ground skink		Extreme south (Narathiwat and Yala)
Eutropis macularia	Scincidae	Variable sun skink	Little ground skink	จิ้งเหลนหลากหลาย	Widespread except southern Peninsula
Plestiodon quadrilineatus	Scincidae	Blue-tailed skink	Four-lined blue-tailed skink		North (Chiang Mai) and Central (Saraburi)
Lipinia vittigera	Scincidae	Common striped skink		จิ้งเหลนลายอินโดจีน	Widespread except southern Peninsula
Lipinia surda	Scincidae	Selangor striped skink	Malayan striped skink		Extreme south (Yala)
Dasia olivacea	Scincidae	Olivaceous tree skink	Olive tree skink	จิ้งเหลนต้นไม้	Southern half of Thailand
Tropidophorus hangnam	Scincidae	Spiny stream skink	Spiny-tailed water skink		Northeast - endemic
Tropidophorus berdmorei	Scincidae	Berdmore's stream skink			Northwest
Tropidophorus cocincinensis	Scincidae	Indochinese stream skink			Northeast
Tropidophorus laotus	Scincidae	Laotian stream skink			Northeast - endemic
Tropidophorus robinsoni	Scincidae	Robinson's stream skink			South (Chumphon)
Tropidophorus thai	Scincidae	Thai stream skink			North (Mae Hong Son and Chiang Mai) - endemic
Tropidophorus microlepis	Scincidae	Cambodian stream skink	Small-scaled water skink		Southeast (Chanthaburi and Sa Kaew)
Tropidophorus matsuii	Scincidae	Matsui's stream skink			Northeast (Roi Et) - endemic
Tropidophorus latiscutatus	Scincidae	Broad-scaled stream skink			Northeast (Nong Khai) - endemic
Scincella doriae	Scincidae	Doria's leaf-litter skink	Marquis Doria's ground skink		North (Chiang Mai) and northeast (Loei)
Scincella melanosticta	Scincidae	Black-spotted leaf-litter skink	Black-spotted ground skink	จิ้งเหลนดินจุดดำ	Widespread
Scincella rufocaudatus	Scincidae	Red-tailed leaf-litter skink	Red-tailed ground skink		Southeast (Chanthaburi)
Scincella reevesii	Scincidae	Reeve's leaf-litter skink	Reeve's ground skink		Widespread
Scincella punctatolineata	Scincidae	Western leaf-litter skink	Spot-lined ground skink		West (Kanchanaburi)
Sphenomorphus mimicus	Scincidae	Mimic forest skink	Dwarf forest skink		Northeast and central - endemic
Sphenomorphus grandisonae	Scincidae	Grandison's forest skink			North (Uttaradit) - endemic
Sphenomorphus maculatus	Scincidae	Common forest skink	Spotted forest skink	จิ้งเหลนภูเขาเกล็ดเรียบ	Widespread except south
Sphenomorphus tersus	Scincidae	Pale forest skink			Peninsula
Sphenomorphus butleri	Scincidae	Butler's forest skink			South (Nakhon Sri Thammarat)
Sphenomorphus helenae	Scincidae	Helen's forest skink			Central (Nonthaburi) - endemic
Sphenomorphus lineopunctulatus	Scincidae	Taylor's forest skink	Spotted-lined forest skink		Northeast (Ubon Ratchathani) - endemic
Sphenomorphus indicus	Scincidae	Indian forest skink		จิ้งเหลนภูเขาอินเดีย	Widespread
Sphenomorphus praesignis	Scincidae	Larut forest skink			South (Nakhon Sri Thammarat)
Sphenomorphus stellatus	Scincidae	Starry forest skink			Northeast (Khon Kaen) and southeast (Chanthaburi)
Sphenomorphus scotophilus	Scincidae	Selangor forest skink			South (Nakhon Sri Thammarat)
Lygosoma isodactylum	Scincidae	Even-toed supple skink	Central supple skink		Central
Lygosoma koratense	Scincidae	Korat supple skink			Central and northeast - endemic
Lygosoma corpulentum	Scincidae	Annamese supple skink			Southeast
Lygosoma haroldyoungi	Scincidae	Banded supple skink	Harold Young's supple skink		North and northeast
Lygosoma quadrupes	Scincidae	Common supple skink	Short-limbed supple skink	จิ้งเหลนเรียวขาเล็ก	Widespread
Lygosoma angeli	Scincidae	Angel's supple skink			Southeast (Chanthaburi)
Riopa anguina	Scincidae	Burmese supple skink			North and west
Subdoluseps bowringii	Scincidae	Bowring's slender skink	Bowring's supple skink		Widespread
Subdoluseps frontoparietalis	Scincidae	Pygmy supple skink			Central (Saraburi)
Subdoluseps herberti	Scincidae	Herbert's slender skink	Herbert's supple skink		South (Ranong to Nakhon Sri Thammarat)
Leptoseps osellai	Scincidae	Boehme's larut skink	Osella's limbless skink		North (Chiang Mai) and Central (Phetchabun) - endemic
Larutia nubisilvicola	Scincidae	Khao Nan limbless skink			South (Nakhon Sri Thammarat)
Isopachys anguinoides	Scincidae	Striped legless skink	Eel-like limbless skink		Upper Peninsula - endemic
Isopachys roulei	Scincidae	Roule's limbless skink			Southeast (Chonburi) - endemic
Isopachys borealis	Scincidae	Western legless skink	Northern limbless skink		West and northeast
Isopachys gyldenstolpei	Scincidae	Gyldenstolpe's legless skink			West
Brachymeles miriamae	Scincidae	Miriam's legless skink		จิ้งเหลนด้วงปักธงชัย	Northeast
Jarujinia bipedalis	Scincidae	Two-legged skink			West (Ratchaburi)
Dibamus alfredi	Scincidae	Alfred's snake skink	Alfred's worm lizard		South (Pattani and Yala) - endemic
Dibamus somsaki	Scincidae	Khao Soi Dao snake skink	Somsak's worm lizard		Southeast (Chanthaburi) - endemic
Dopasia gracilis	Anguidae	Indian glass lizard	Indian glass snake		North and northeast
Varanus rudicollis	Varanidae	Red-necked monitor	Rough-necked monitor lizard	เห่าช้าง	West and south
Varanus dumerilii	Varanidae	Harlequin monitor	Dumeril's monitor lizard	ตุ๊ดตู่	West and south
Varanus salvator	Varanidae	Water monitor		เหี้ย	Widespread
Varanus nebulosus	Varanidae	South-east Asian monitor	Clouded monitor	ตะกวดใต้, ตะกวดลายเมฆ	Widespread

== Order Squamata, Suborder Serpentes (snakes) ==
Scientific name	Family	Common name	Synonyms	Thai name	Geographical range
Ramphotyphlops lineatus	Typhlopidae	Striped blind snake	Lined blind snake		Extreme south
Indotyphlops albiceps	Typhlopidae	White-headed blind snake		งูดินหัวขาว	Widespread
Indotyphlops braminus	Typhlopidae	Common blind snake	Brahminy blind snake	งูดินธรรมดา, งูดินบ้าน	Widespread
Indotyphlops ozakiae	Typhlopidae	Ozaki's blind snake			Northeast (Nakhon Ratchasima)
Gerrhopilus floweri	Typhlopidae	Flower's blind snake			Central (Bangkok and Pathum Thani) - endemic
Indotyphlops khoratensis	Typhlopidae	Khorat blind snake		งูดินโคราช	Northeast (Khorat Plateau)
Indotyphlops porrectus	Typhlopidae	Slender blind snake	Slender worm snake		North (Chiang Mai)
Argyrophis trangensis	Typhlopidae	Trang blind snake			South (Trang) - endemic
Argyrophis diardii	Typhlopidae	Diard's blind snake			North, west, northeast and central
Argyrophis muelleri	Typhlopidae	Mueller's blind snake			Northeast, southeast and south
Argyrophis siamensis	Typhlopidae	Siamese blind snake	Thai blind snake		Southeast (Chanthaburi)
Typhlops roxaneae	Typhlopidae	Roxane's blind snake			Central (Bangkok) - endemic
Cylindrophis ruffus	Cylindrophiidae	Red-tailed pipe snake	Common pipe snake		Widespread
Xenopeltis unicolor	Xenopeltidae	Sunbeam snake		งูแสงอาทิตย์	Widespread
Malayopython reticulatus	Pythonidae	Reticulated python			Widespread
Python bivittatus	Pythonidae	Burmese python	Indian rock python		Widespread except southern Peninsula
Python brongersmai	Pythonidae	Blood python	Brongersma's short-tailed python		Peninsula
Acrochordus javanicus	Acrochordidae	Javan file snake	Elephant trunk snake		Central, southeast and south
Acrochordus granulatus	Acrochordidae	Banded file snake	Wart snake, little file snake		Peninsula and southeast
Aplopeltura boa	Colubridae	Blunt-headed tree snake	Blunt-headed slug-eating snake		South (Chumphon southward)
Asthenodipsas laevis	Colubridae	Smooth slug-eating snake			South (Nakhon Sri Thammarat and Narathiwat)
Asthenodipsas malaccanus	Colubridae	Malaccan slug-eating snake	Malayan slug-eating snake		Extreme south
Pareas carinatus	Colubridae	Keeled slug-eating snake		งูกินทากเกล็ดสัน	Widespread
Pareas margaritophorus	Colubridae	White-spotted slug-eating snake		งูกินทากจุดขาว, งูกินทากลายขาว	Widespread
Pareas macularius	Colubridae	Black-spotted slug-eating snake	Spotted slug-eating snake		North (Chiang Mai) and northeast (Loei)
Pareas hamptoni	Colubridae	Hampton's slug-eating snake			Southeast (Chanthaburi) and south (Narathiwat)
Xenodermus javanicus	Colubridae	Dragon snake	Rough-backed litter snake	งูขอนท้องขาว	Extreme south (Yala)
Parafimbrios lao	Colubridae	Laos odd-scaled snake			North (Nan)
Coelognathus flavolineatus	Colubridae	Yellow-striped racer	Yellow-striped trinket snake	งูทางมะพร้าวดำ, งูหลุนชุน	Northeast (Nakhon Ratchasima) and extreme south
Coelognathus radiatus	Colubridae	Copperhead racer	Copper-head trinket snake, radiated rat snake	งูทางมะพร้าวธรรมดา, งูทามะพร้าวลายขีด	Widespread
Oreocryptophis porphyraceus	Colubridae	Red mountain racer	Red bamboo trinket snake		North and northeast
Orthriophis taeniurus	Colubridae	Yellow black-tailed racer	Cave racer		Widespread except central
Gongylosoma oxycephalum	Colubridae	Red-tailed racer	Flower's racer		Widespread
Gonyosoma prasinus	Colubridae	Green mountain racer	Green trinket snake		North, northeast and south
Ptyas korros	Colubridae	Indochinese rat snake	Javan rat snake	งูสิงบ้าน, งูเห่าตะลาน	Widespread
Ptyas mucosa	Colubridae	Common rat snake	Indian rat snake, Oriental rat snake		Widespread
Ptyas carinata	Colubridae	Keeled rat snake	Malayan keeled rat snake		Widespread
Ptyas fusca	Colubridae	White-bellied rat snake			South
Xenelaphis hexagonotus	Colubridae	Malayan brown snake			South
Gongylosoma scriptum	Colubridae	Common ringneck	Indochinese ground snake	งูสายทองคอแหวน	Widespread except southeast
Gongylosoma baliodeirum	Colubridae	Striped ringneck	Orange-bellied snake		Southeast (Chanthaburi) and extreme south
Gongylosoma longicaudata	Colubridae	Long-tailed ringneck			Extreme south (Narathiwat)
Liopeltis tricolor	Colubridae	Three-coloured ringneck	Tricoloured ringneck		Peninsula
Oligodon cinereus	Colubridae	Ashy kukri snake	Grey kukri snake	งูปี่แก้วลายกระ	North and northeast
Oligodon inornatus	Colubridae	Inornate kukri snake	Unicoloured kukri snake	งูปี่แก้วสีจาง	West, northeast and southeast
Oligodon joynsoni	Colubridae	Joynson's kukri snake			Central and northeast - endemic
Oligodon purpurascens	Colubridae	Purple kukri snake			South
Oligodon catenatus	Colubridae	Blyth's kukri snake	ChIain-banded kukri snake		Northeast
Oligodon jintakunei	Colubridae	Jintakune's kukri snake			South (Krabi) - endemic
Oligodon fasciolatus	Colubridae	Banded kukri snake	Small-banded kukri snake	งูปี่แก้วลายแต้ม	North, northeast and southeast
Oligodon taeniatus	Colubridae	Striped kukri snake		งูงอดไทย, งูงอดหลังลาย	Central and northeast
Oligodon mouhoti	Colubridae	Cambodian kukri snake			Central and southeast
Oligodon barroni	Colubridae	Barron's kukri snake			Central and southeast
Oligodon dorsalis	Colubridae	Gray's kukri snake	Bengalese kukri snake		No information
Oligodon theobaldi	Colubridae	Theobald's kukri snake			West (Tak)
Calamaria lumbricoidea	Colubridae	Variable reed snake			Extreme south
Calamaria pavimentata	Colubridae	Collared reed snake	Brown reed snake	งูพงอ้อท้องเหลือง, งูพงอ้อสีน้ำตาล	North and southeast
Calamaria schlegeli	Colubridae	Red-headed reed snake			Extreme south (Pattani)
Pseudorabdion longiceps	Colubridae	Long-headed reed snake	Dwarf reed snake		Extreme south (Narathiwat and Yala)
Macrocalamus lateralis	Colubridae	Malayan mountain reed snake	Striped reed snake		South (Nakhon Sri Thammarat and Narathiwat)
Dendrelaphis caudolineatus	Colubridae	Striped bronzeback	Stripe-tailed bronzeback tree snake		South
Dendrelaphis subocularis	Colubridae	Mountain bronzeback			North, west and northeast
Dendrelaphis kopsteini	Colubridae	Elegent bronzeback	Kopstein's bronzeback tree snake		South
Dendrelaphis cyanochloris	Colubridae	Wall's bronzeback	Blue bronzeback		Peninsula
Dendrelaphis pictus	Colubridae	Common bronzeback	Painted bronzeback tree snake		Widespread
Dendrelaphis ngansonensis	Colubridae	Vietnamese bronzeback	Nganson bronzeback		Southeast (Chanthaburi)
Dendrelaphis striatus	Colubridae	Banded bronzeback	Striated bronzeback tree snake		South
Dendrelaphis nigroserratus	Colubridae	Sawtooth-necked bronzeback			
Chrysopelea paradisi	Colubridae	Paradise tree snake	Garden flying snake		South
Chrysopelea ornata	Colubridae	Golden tree snake	Ornate flying snake	งูเขียวพระอินทร์, งูเขียวดอกหมาก	Widespread
Chrysopelea pelias	Colubridae	Twin-barred tree snake	Twin-barred flying snake		South (Nakhon Sri Thammarat and Songkhla)
Lycodon capucinus	Colubridae	Common wolf snake	Island wolf snake	งูปล้องฉนวนสร้อยเหลือง, งูสร้อยเหลือง	Widespread
Lycodon subcinctus	Colubridae	Malayan banded wolf snake	White-banded wolf snake	งูปล้องฉนวนบ้าน	Widespread
Lycodon laoensis	Colubridae	Yellow-barred wolf snake	Laos wolf snake	งูปล้องฉนวนลายเหลือง, งูปล้องฉนวนลาว	Widespread
Lycodon butleri	Colubridae	Butler's wolf snake			South
Lycodon effraenis	Colubridae	Brown wolf snake			Extreme south (Yala and Narathiwat)
Lycodon fasciatus	Colubridae	Indian banded wolf snake		งูปล้องฉนวนเมืองเหนือ	Widespread except Peninsula
Lycodon cardamomensis	Colubridae	Cardamom wolf snake			Southeast (Chanthaburi)
Lycodon ophiophagus	Colubridae	Snake-eater wolf snake			
Lycodon septentrionalis	Colubridae	Hill wolf snake	Northern large-toothed snake, white-banded wolf snake		North (Chiang Mai and Nan)
Lycodon albofuscus	Colubridae	Slender wolf snake			South
Lycodon davisonii	Colubridae	Common bridle snake	Davison's bridled snake, Blanford's bridled snake	งูปล้องฉนวนอินเดีย, งูปล้องฉนวนตับจาก, งูปล้องฉนวนป่าต่ำ	Widespread
Lycodon subannulatus	Colubridae	Malayan bridle snake	Half-banded bridled snake		South
Stegonotus borneensis	Colubridae	Borneo red snake			South (Nakhon Sri Thammarat)
Plagiopholis nuchalis	Colubridae	Burmese mountain snake	Common blotch-necked snake, Assam mountain snake		North, west and northeast
Plagiopholis blakewayi	Colubridae	Blakeway's mountain snake	Blakeway's blotch-necked snake		North (Chiang Mai)
Sibynophis melanocephalus	Colubridae	Malayan blackhead	White-lipped black-headed snake		Extreme south (Pattani and Narathiwat)
Sibynophis triangularis	Colubridae	Triangle blackhead	Triangled black-headed snake	งูคอขวั้นหัวลายสามเหลี่ยม, งูสาบหญ้าแดง	Southeast - endemic
Sibynophis collaris	Colubridae	Collared blackhead	Collared black-headed snake	งูคอขวั้นหัวดำ, งูสาบหญ้คอดำ	Widespread except Peninsula
Boiga drapiezii	Colubridae	White-spotted cat snake	White-toothed cat snake		South
Boiga multomaculata	Colubridae	Many-spotted cat snake		งูแม่ตะงาว	Widespread
Boiga cyanea	Colubridae	Green cat snake		งูเขียวบอน, งูเขียวดง	Widespread
Boiga saengsomi	Colubridae	Banded green cat snake			South (Krabi) - endemic
Boiga denrophila	Colubridae	Mangrove cat snake			South
Boiga nigriceps	Colubridae	Red cat snake	Black-headed cat snake		Extreme south (Pattani and Narathiwat)
Boiga jaspidea	Colubridae	Jasper cat snake			South
Boiga siamensis	Colubridae	Grey cat snake	Thai cat snake, Siamese cat snake	งูแส้หางม้า, งูแส้หางม้าเล็ก, งูตาแมวเล็ก	Widespread except southern Peninsula
Boiga cynodon	Colubridae	Dog-toothed cat snake			South
Boiga bengkuluensis	Colubridae	Bengkulu cat snake			
Psammodynastes pulverulentus	Colubridae	Common mock viper			Widespread
Psammophis indochinensis	Colubridae	Indochinese sand snake			North and central
Ahaetulla prasina	Colubridae	Oriental whip snake	Oriental vine snake	งูเขียวหัวจิ้งจก, งูง่วงกลางดง, งูกล่อมนางนอน	Widespread
Ahaetulla mycterizans	Colubridae	Malayan green whip snake	Malayan vine snake		South
Ahaetulla nasuta	Colubridae	Long-nosed whip snake	Indian vine snake	งูเขียวปากแหนบ	Central and southeast
Ahaetulla fasciolata	Colubridae	Speckle-headed whip snake	Speckle-headed vine snake		South
Dryophiops rubescens	Colubridae	Brown whip snake	Keel-bellied whip snake		South
Sinonatrix percarinatus	Colubridae	Chinese keelback	Chinese keelback water snake		North and northeast
Sinonatrix yunnanensis	Colubridae	Yunnan keelback			North
Fowlea flavipunctatus	Colubridae	Common keelback	Yellow-spotted keelback water snake	งูลายสอสวน, งูลายสอบ้าน	Widespread
Fowlea piscator	Colubridae	Chequered keelback	Chequered keelback water snake	งูลายสอใหญ่	North
Fowlea punctulatus	Colubridae	Burmese keelback	Spotted keelback water snake		North (Mae Hong Son)
Xenochrophis trianguligerus	Colubridae	Triangle keelback	Red-sided keelback water snake		West and south
Opisthotropis spenceri	Colubridae	Spencer's mountain keelback	Spencer's stream snake		North (Phrae) - endemic
Opisthotropis maculosus	Colubridae	Yellow-spotted mountain keelback	Spotted mountain stream snake		Northeast (Bueng Kan) - endemic
Paratapinophis praemaxillaris	Colubridae	Angel's mountain keelback	Brown stream snake		North (Chiang Mai and Nan)
Parahelicops boonsongi	Colubridae	Boonsong's mountain keelback			Northeast (Loei) - endemic
Rhabdophis subminiatus	Colubridae	Red-necked keelback		งูลายสาบคอแดง	Widespread
Rhabdophis nigrocinctus	Colubridae	Green keelback	Black-banded keelback	งูลายสาบเขียวขวั้นดำ	Widespread
Rhabdophis chrysargos	Colubridae	Speckle-bellied keelback			Widespread
Rhabdophis rhodomelas	Colubridae	Blue-necked keelback			South
Rhabdophis flaviceps	Colubridae	Red-headed keelback	Orange-lipped keelback		South
Hebius boulengeri	Colubridae	Boulenger's keelback			Northeast (Nakhon Ratchasima)
Hebius deschauenseei	Colubridae	Northern keelback	Deschauensee's keelback		North and northeast (Chiang Mai and Uthai Thani)
Hebius groundwateri	Colubridae	Groundwater's keelback			Peninsula (Chumphon) - endemic
Hebius inas	Colubridae	Malayan mountain keelback	Gunung Inas keelback		South (Nakhon Sri Thammarat)
Hebius khasiensis	Colubridae	Khasi keelback			North and northeast
Hebius bitaeniatus	Colubridae	Striped keelback	Two-striped keelback		North (Chiang Mai and Nan)
Amphiesma stolatum	Colubridae	White-striped keelback	Buff-striped keelback	งูลายสาบดอกหญ้า	Widespread except south
Pseudoxenodon macrops	Colubridae	Large-eyed bamboo snake	Large-eyed false cobra		North, northeast, west and south
Subsessor bocourti	Homalopsidae	Bocourt's water snake			Central, southeast and south
Hypsiscopus plumbea	Homalopsidae	Boie's mud snake	Grey water snake, rice paddy snake	งูปลิง	Widespread
Enhydris enhydris	Homalopsidae	Rainbow water snake			Widespread except north
Enhydris subtaeniata	Homalopsidae	Mekong mud snake	Indochinese water snake		Central, southeast and northeast
Enhydris jagorii	Homalopsidae	Bangkok mud snake	Jagor's water snake		Central and southeast
Enhydris chanardi	Homalopsidae	Chan-ard's water snake			Central - endemic
Homalopsis buccata	Homalopsidae	Puff-faced water snake			Widespread except north
Homalopsis negroventralis	Homalopsidae	Deuve's water snake	Cambodian puff-faced water snake		Northeast (Nakhon Phanom and Sakon Nakhon)
Homalopsis mereljcoxi	Homalopsidae	Jack's water snake			
Cerberus rynchops	Homalopsidae	Asian bockadam	Dog-faced water snake		Central, southeast and south
Cerberus schneiderii	Homalopsidae	South-east Asian bockadam			West (Phetchaburi)
Gerada prevostiana	Homalopsidae	Gerard's water snake	Glossy marsh snake		Central
Fordonia leucobadia	Homalopsidae	Crab-eating water snake	Crab-eating mangrove snake		South (Phuket to Satun)
Cantoria violacea	Homalopsidae	Cantor's mangrove snake	Yellow-banded mangrove snake		South (Phuket)
Bitia hydroides	Homalopsidae	Keel-bellied estuarine snake	Keel-bellied water snake		Central (Bangkok)
Erpeton tentaculatus	Homalopsidae	Tentacled snake			Central, southeast and south
Bungarus flaviceps	Elapidae	Red-headed krait			Peninsula
Bungarus candidus	Elapidae	Blue krait	Malayan krait	งูทับสมิงคลา, งูทับทางขาว, งูปล้องเงิน	Widespread
Bungarus fasciatus	Elapidae	Banded krait		งูสามเหลี่ยม, งูทับทางเหลือง, งูปล้องทอง	Widespread
Bungarus multicinctus	Elapidae	Many-banded krait			North
Naja kaouthia	Elapidae	Monocled cobra			Widespread
Naja siamensis	Elapidae	Indochinese spitting cobra		งูเห่าพ่นพิษสยาม	Central, southeast and northeast
Naja sumatrana	Elapidae	Sumatran spitting cobra			South
Ophiophagus hannah	Elapidae	King cobra		งูจงอาง, งูบองหลา	Widespread
Calliophis gracilis	Elapidae	Spotted coral snake			South (Pattani)
Calliophis bivirgatus	Elapidae	Blue long-glanded coral snake	Blue coral snake		Extreme south
Calliophis intestinalis	Elapidae	Brown long-glanded coral snake	Malayan striped coral snake		South
Calliophis maculiceps	Elapidae	Small-spotted coral snake	Speckled coral snake	งูปล้องหวายหัวดำ	Widespread
Sinomicrurus macclellandi	Elapidae	MacClelland's coral snake			Widespread except peninsula
Laticauda colubrina	Hydrophiidae	Yellow-lipped sea krait			South (Phuket)
Laticauda laticaudata	Hydrophiidae	Black-banded sea krait	Large-scaled sea krait		South (east coast)
Acalyptophis eydouxii	Hydrophiidae	Spot-banded sea krait	Beaded sea snake		Central (Gulf coast)
Lapemis curtus	Hydrophiidae	Hardwicke's sea snake	Short sea snake		Central, southeast and south
Kolpophis annandalei	Hydrophiidae	Annandale's sea snake			South (east coast)
Disteira nigrocincta	Hydrophiidae	Black-banded sea snake			South (Phuket to Krabi)
Hydrophis stokesii	Hydrophiidae	Stokes's sea snake			Central and south
Enhydrina schistoma	Hydrophiidae	Beaked sea snake			Central and south
Kerilia jerdonii	Hydrophiidae	Jerdon's snake	Saddle-backed sea snake		South
Thalassophis anomalus	Hydrophiidae	Anomalous sea snake			Southeast
Acalyptophis peronii	Hydrophiidae	Peron's sea snake	Horned sea snake		Southeast and south (east coast)
Pelamis platura	Hydrophiidae	Yellow-bellied sea snake			Central, southeast and south
Hydrophis viperinus	Hydrophiidae	Viperine sea snake	Grey sea snake		Central and south
Hydrophis cantoris	Hydrophiidae	Gunther's sea snake	Cantor's sea snake		South (west coast)
Hydrophis gracilis	Hydrophiidae	Graceful sea snake	Narrow-headed sea snake		South
Hydrophis klossi	Hydrophiidae	Kloss's sea snake			South
Hydrophis melanosoma	Hydrophiidae	Black sea snake			Southeast and south
Hydrophis obscurus	Hydrophiidae	Daudin's sea snake			South (west coast)
Hydrophis brookii	Hydrophiidae	Brook's sea snake			South
Hydrophis fasciatus	Hydrophiidae	Striped sea snake	Banded sea snake		South
Hydrophis nigrocinctus	Hydrophiidae	Black-banded sea snake			South
Hydrophis belcheri	Hydrophiidae	Faint-banded sea snake			South
Hydrophis hardwickii	Hydrophiidae	Hardwicke's spine-bellied sea snake			South
Hydrophis atriceps	Hydrophiidae	Black-headed sea snake	Garlanded sea snake		Southeast and south (east coast)
Hydrophis lapemoides	Hydrophiidae	Persian Gulf sea snake			South
Hydrophis bituberculatus	Hydrophiidae	Biturberculated sea snake	Two-wattled sea snake		South (west coast)
Hydrophis inornatus	Hydrophiidae	Inornate sea snake			Central and south
Hydrophis spiralis	Hydrophiidae	Yellow sea snake			Central and south
Hydrophis ornatus	Hydrophiidae	Reef sea snake	Ornate sea snake		Central and south
Hydrophis lamberti	Hydrophiidae	Lambert's sea snake			Central and south
Polydontognathus caerulescens	Hydrophiidae	Dark blue-banded sea snake	Blue-grey sea snake		Central and south
Leioselasma cyanocinctus	Hydrophiidae	Blue-banded sea snake	Annulated sea snake		Southeast and south
Daboia siamensis	Viperidae	Siamese viper			Central
Calloselasma rhodostoma	Crotalidae	Malayan pit viper		งูกะปะ, งูขว้างค้อน	Widespread
Ovophis monticola	Crotalidae	Indo-Malayan mountain pit viper	Malayan brown pit viper		Widespread except Peninsula
Trimeresurus albolabris	Crotalidae	White-lipped pit viper		งูเขียวหางไหม้ท้องเหลือง	Widespread
Trimeresurus purpureomaculatus	Crotalidae	Mangrove pit viper			South
Trimeresurus macrops	Crotalidae	Large-eyed pit viper		งูเขียวหางไหม้ตาโต, งูเขียวหางไม้สีมะกอก	Northeast and southeast
Trimeresurus kanburiensis	Crotalidae	Kanburi pit viper			West (Kanchanaburi) - endemic
Trimeresurus venustus	Crotalidae	Brown-spotted pit viper	Beautiful pit viper		South (Surat Thani and Nakhon Sri Thammarat)
Trimeresurus phuketensis	Crotalidae	Phuket pit viper			
Trimeresurus gumprechti	Crotalidae	Gumprecht's green pit viper			Northeast
Trimeresurus vogeli	Crotalidae	Vogel's pit viper		งูเขียวไผ่หางเขียว	Northeast and southeast
Trimeresurus sumatranus	Crotalidae	Sumatran pit viper			Extreme south (Pattani and Narathiwat)
Trimeresurus hageni	Crotalidae	Hagen's green pit viper			South
Trimeresurus popeiorum	Crotalidae	Pope's pit viper			North and west
Trimeresurus fucatus	Crotalidae	Banded pit viper	Thai Peninsula pit viper		South
Trimeresurus nebularis	Crotalidae	Clouded pit viper			Extreme south (Narathiwat)
Trimeresurus wiroti	Crotalidae	Wirot's palm pit viper			South (Phattalung and Narathiwat)
Trimeresurus cardamomensis	Crotalidae	Cardamom green pit viper			Southeast
Tropidolaemus wagleri	Crotalidae	Wagler's pit viper			South

== Common species ==
Reptile species commonly found in anthropogenically modified environments (i.e., near human settlements) include:

- Calotes versicolor (oriental garden lizard)
- Eutropis macularia (bronze grass skink)
- Eutropis multifasciata (common sun skink)
- Gekko gecko (tokay gecko)
- Gehyra mutilata (stump-toed gecko)
- Hemidactylus frenatus (common house gecko)
- Hemidactylus platyurus (flat-tailed house gecko)
- Ramphotyphlops braminus (common blind snake)
- Python reticulatus (reticulated python)
- Dendrelaphis pictus (painted bronzeback)
- Enhydris plumbea (rice paddy snake)
- Ptyas mucosa (oriental ratsnake)
- Rhabdophis subminiatus (red-necked keelback)
- Bungarus fasciatus (banded krait)

== See also ==
- List of amphibians of Thailand
- List of birds of Thailand
- List of mammals of Thailand
- List of butterflies of Thailand
- List of non-marine molluscs of Thailand
- List of species native to Thailand
