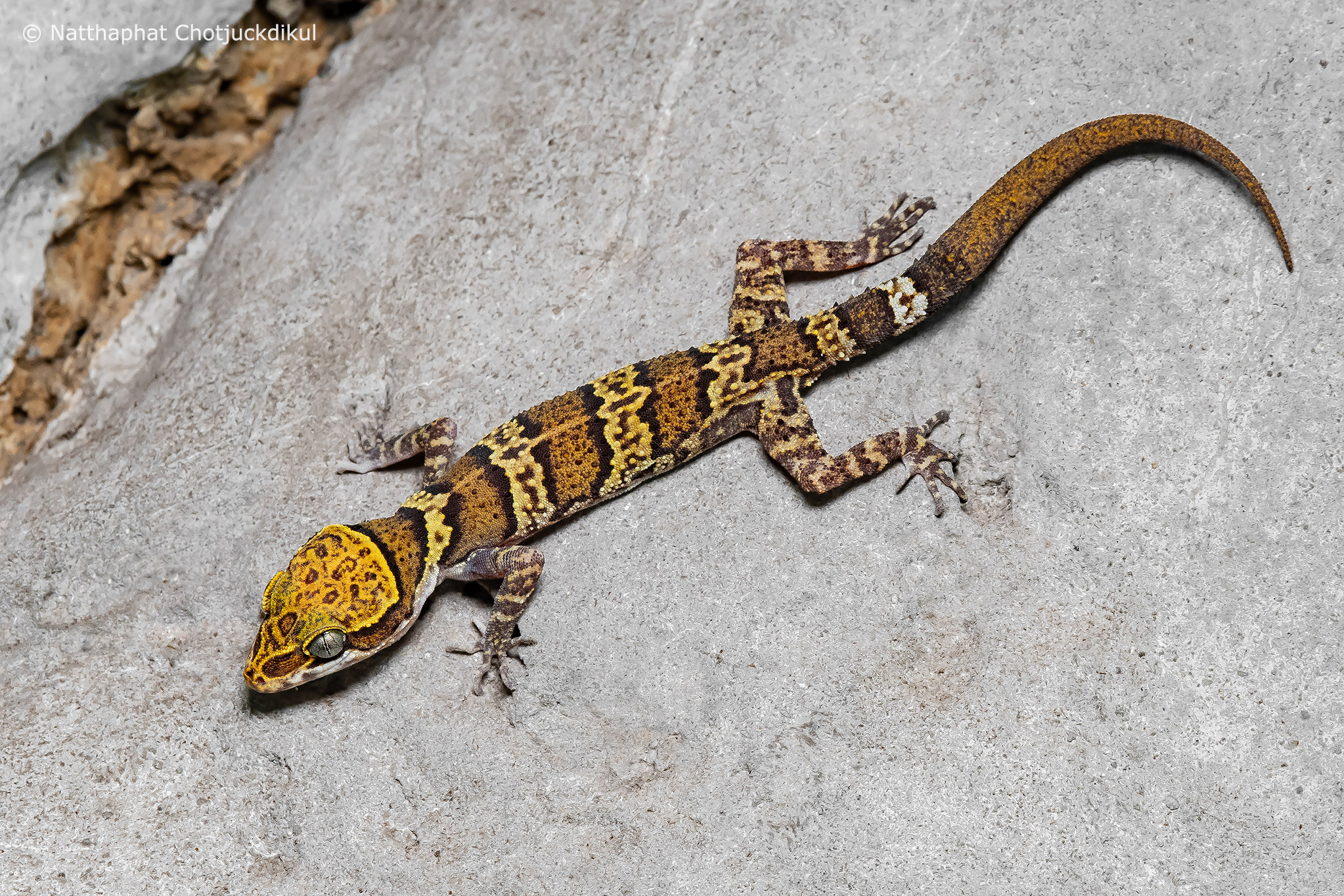

Scientific classification
- Kingdom: Animalia
- Phylum: Chordata
- Class: Reptilia
- Order: Squamata
- Suborder: Gekkota
- Family: Gekkonidae
- Genus: Cyrtodactylus
- Species: C. panitvongi

Binomial name
- Cyrtodactylus panitvongi Pauwels, Chotjuckdikul, Donbundit, Sumontha & Meesook, 2024

= Cyrtodactylus panitvongi =

Species of bent-toed gecko

Cyrtodactylus panitvongi, the Lopburi bent-toed gecko, is a species of lizard in the family Gekkonidae. It is native to Thailand.

== Etymology ==
The specific name of the species, panitvongi, is in honor of the Thai biologist Nonn Panitvong.

== Description ==
It can be separated from other members of the genus Cyrtodactylus by its combination of maximum snout–vent length of 8.5 cm (3.3 in), 18 longitudinal rows of dorsal tubercles at the midbody, 10 to 11 dark-colored rings on the tail, and a golden iris.

== Distribution ==
The type locality of this species is in Lopburi province, Thailand.
