= Nui Chua bent-toed gecko =

Scientific classification
- Kingdom: Animalia
- Phylum: Chordata
- Class: Reptilia
- Order: Squamata
- Suborder: Gekkota
- Family: Gekkonidae
- Genus: Cyrtodactylus
- Species: C. sangi

Binomial name
- Cyrtodactylus sangi Pauwels, Nazarov, Bobrov & Poyarkov, 2018

Species of lizard

The Nui Chua bent-toed gecko (Cyrtodactylus sangi) is a species of lizard in the family Gekkonidae. The species is endemic to Vietnam.

== Etymology ==
The specific epithet sangi honors Vietnamese herpetologist Ngoc Sang Nguyen, who has helped the herpetological community with its work in the taxonomy and understanding of the Cyrtodactylus.

== Geographic range ==
C. sangi is found in southern Vietnam, in Ninh Thuan Province.

== Description ==
C. sangi can be differentiated from its congeners by its small size, snout-to-vent length 56.3 mm (2.22 in), absence of the precloacal groove, transversally enlarged medium subcaudal scales, and the presence of irregular rows to the midbody, among other characteristics.

== Reproduction ==
The mode of reproduction of C. sangi is unknown.
