= Hemidactylus beninensis =

Conservation status
- Least Concern (IUCN 3.1)

Scientific classification
- Kingdom: Animalia
- Phylum: Chordata
- Class: Reptilia
- Order: Squamata
- Suborder: Gekkota
- Family: Gekkonidae
- Genus: Hemidactylus
- Species: H. beninensis

Binomial name
- Hemidactylus beninensis Bauer, Tchibozo, Pauwels, & Lenglet, 2006

Species of lizard

Hemidactylus beninensis is a species of gecko. It is endemic to Benin.
