= Cyrtodactylus thathomensis =

Scientific classification
- Kingdom: Animalia
- Phylum: Chordata
- Class: Reptilia
- Order: Squamata
- Suborder: Gekkota
- Family: Gekkonidae
- Genus: Cyrtodactylus
- Species: C. thathomensis

Binomial name
- Cyrtodactylus thathomensis Nazarov, Pauwels, Konstantinov, Chulisov, Orlov, & Poyarkov, 2018

Species of lizard

Cyrtodactylus thathomensis, also known as the Thathom bent-toed gecko, is a species of gecko endemic to Laos.
