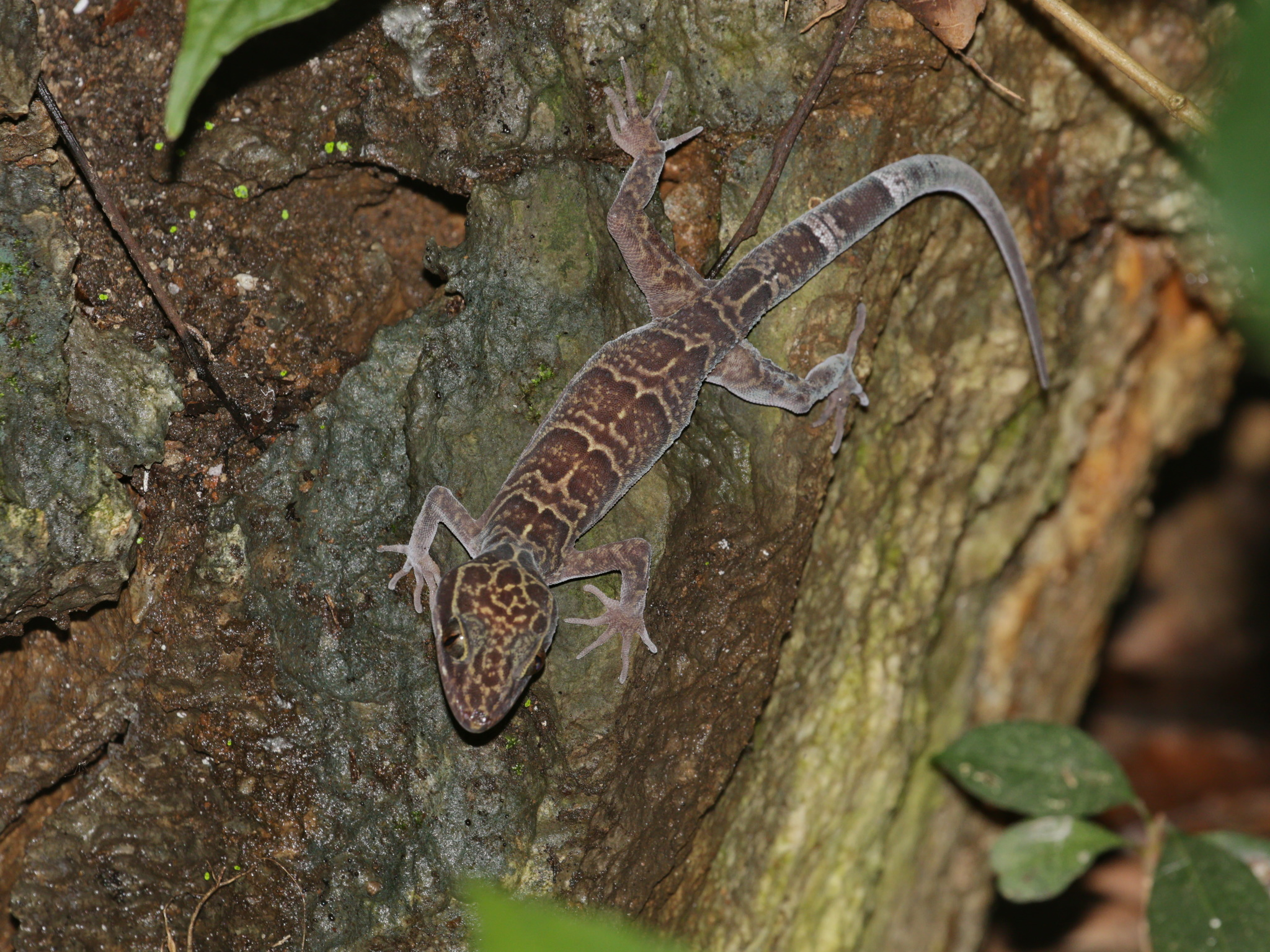

Conservation status
- Endangered (IUCN 3.1)

Scientific classification
- Kingdom: Animalia
- Phylum: Chordata
- Class: Reptilia
- Order: Squamata
- Suborder: Gekkota
- Family: Gekkonidae
- Genus: Cyrtodactylus
- Species: C. khelangensis

Binomial name
- Cyrtodactylus khelangensis Pauwels, Sumontha, Panitvong & Varaguttanonda, 2014

= Lampang bent-toed gecko =

Species of lizard

The Lampang bent-toed gecko (Cyrtodactylus khelangensis) is a species of gecko that is endemic to Thailand.
