= Ranong bent-toed gecko =

Scientific classification
- Kingdom: Animalia
- Phylum: Chordata
- Class: Reptilia
- Order: Squamata
- Suborder: Gekkota
- Family: Gekkonidae
- Genus: Cyrtodactylus
- Species: C. ranongensis

Binomial name
- Cyrtodactylus ranongensis Sumontha, Pauwels, panitvong, Kunya, & Grismer, 2015

Species of lizard

The Ranong bent-toed gecko (Cyrtodactylus ranongensis) is a species of gecko that is endemic to southern Thailand.
