= Starry bent-toed gecko =

Scientific classification
- Kingdom: Animalia
- Phylum: Chordata
- Class: Reptilia
- Order: Squamata
- Suborder: Gekkota
- Family: Gekkonidae
- Genus: Cyrtodactylus
- Species: C. astrum

Binomial name
- Cyrtodactylus astrum Grismer, Wood Jr., Quah, Anuar, Muin, Sumontha, Ahmad, Bauer, Wangkulangkul, Grismer & Pauwels, 2012

Species of lizard

The starry bent-toed gecko (Cyrtodactylus astrum) is a species of gecko endemic to southern Thailand and peninsular Malaysia. The epithet (astrum) references the star-like pattern formed by the white tubercules present on the gecko's back. It is found in lowland forests.
