= Cnemaspis punctatonuchalis =

Conservation status
- Least Concern (IUCN 3.1)

Scientific classification
- Kingdom: Animalia
- Phylum: Chordata
- Class: Reptilia
- Order: Squamata
- Suborder: Gekkota
- Family: Gekkonidae
- Genus: Cnemaspis
- Species: C. punctatonuchalis

Binomial name
- Cnemaspis punctatonuchalis Grismer, Sumontha, Cota, Grismer, Wood, Pauwels & Kunya, 2010

Species of lizard

Cnemaspis punctatonuchalis, also known as the spotted-neck rock gecko, is a species of gecko endemic to central Thailand.
