= Doi Suthep bent-toed gecko =

Scientific classification
- Kingdom: Animalia
- Phylum: Chordata
- Class: Reptilia
- Order: Squamata
- Suborder: Gekkota
- Family: Gekkonidae
- Genus: Cyrtodactylus
- Species: C. doisuthep

Binomial name
- Cyrtodactylus doisuthep Kunya, Panmongkol, Pauwels, Sumontha, Meewasana, Bunkhwamdi, & Dangsri, 2014

Species of lizard

The Doi Suthep bent-toed gecko (Cyrtodactylus doisuthep) is a species of gecko that is endemic to northern Thailand.
