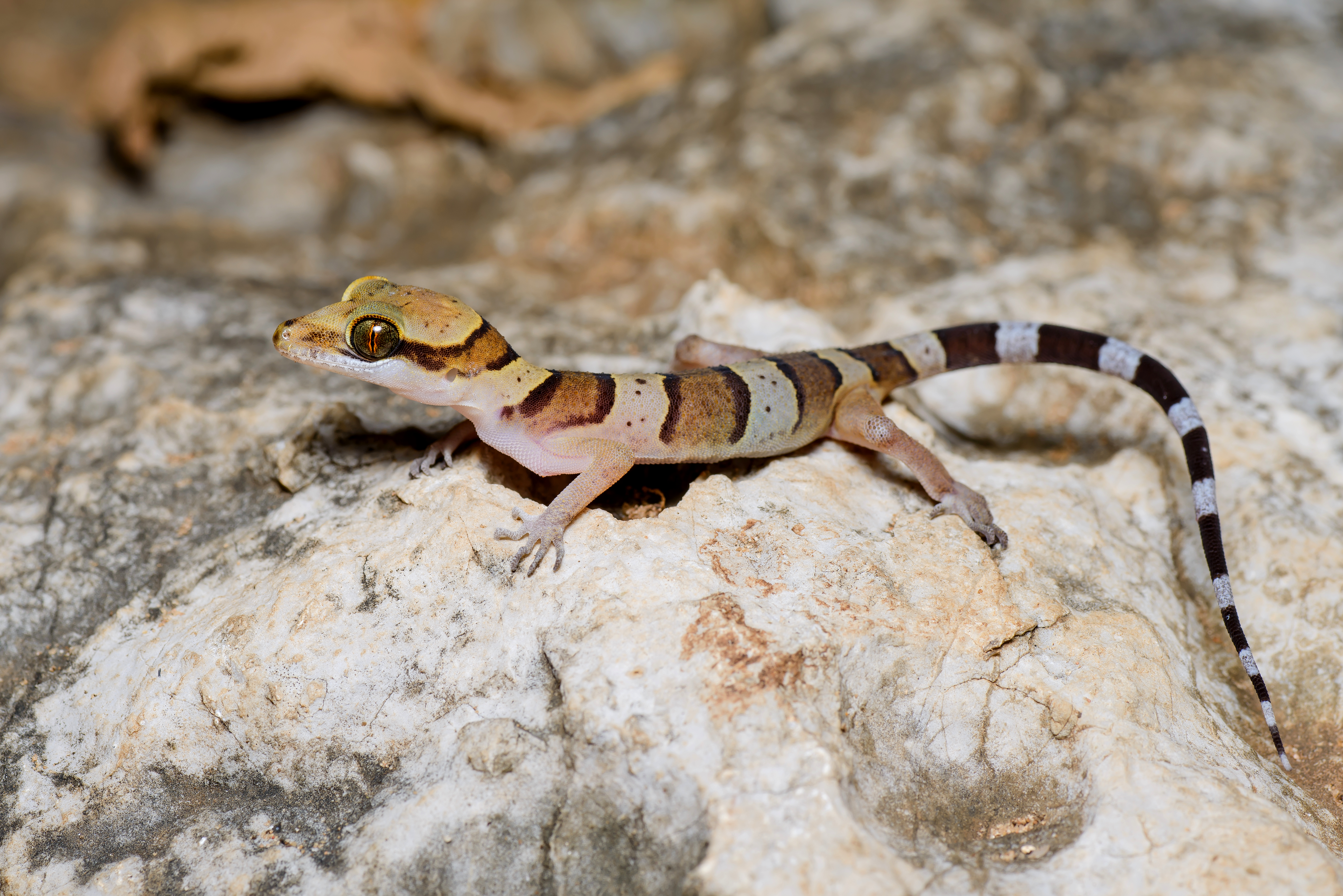

Conservation status
- Least Concern (IUCN 3.1)

Scientific classification
- Kingdom: Animalia
- Phylum: Chordata
- Class: Reptilia
- Order: Squamata
- Suborder: Gekkota
- Family: Gekkonidae
- Genus: Cyrtodactylus
- Species: C. samroiyot

Binomial name
- Cyrtodactylus samroiyot Pauwels & Sumontha, 2014

= Sam Roi Yot bent-toed gecko =

Species of lizard

The Sam Roi Yot bent-toed gecko (Cyrtodactylus samroiyot) is a species of gecko that is endemic to Thailand.

It was first described by Olivier Pauwels and Montri Sumontha in 2014. The specific epithet, samroiyot, means "three hundred peaks" and refers to the district where the type specimen was found. It is found in rocky, sparsely vegetated areas on limestone cliffs. It lays two eggs.
