= Red-eyed bent-toed gecko =

Scientific classification
- Kingdom: Animalia
- Phylum: Chordata
- Class: Reptilia
- Order: Squamata
- Suborder: Gekkota
- Family: Gekkonidae
- Genus: Cyrtodactylus
- Species: C. erythrops

Binomial name
- Cyrtodactylus erythrops Bauer, Kunya, Sumontha, Niyomwan, Panitvong, Pauwels, Chanhome, & Kunya, 2009

Species of lizard

The red-eyed bent-toed gecko (Cyrtodactylus erythrops) is a species of gecko that is endemic to southern Thailand.

== Description ==
The red-eyed bent-toed gecko can be distinguished from other Gekkonidae by its slim body and limbs, its long digits, and large, smooth dorsal scaling.
