= Doi Inthanon bent-toed gecko =

Scientific classification
- Kingdom: Animalia
- Phylum: Chordata
- Class: Reptilia
- Order: Squamata
- Suborder: Gekkota
- Family: Gekkonidae
- Genus: Cyrtodactylus
- Species: C. inthanon

Binomial name
- Cyrtodactylus inthanon Kunya, Sumontha, Panitvong, Dongkumfu, Sirisamphan & Pauwels, 2015

Synonyms
- Gonydactylus ingeri

Gecko endemic to Thailand

The Doi Inthanon bent-toed gecko (Cyrtodactylus inthanon) is a species of gecko that is endemic to northern Thailand.
