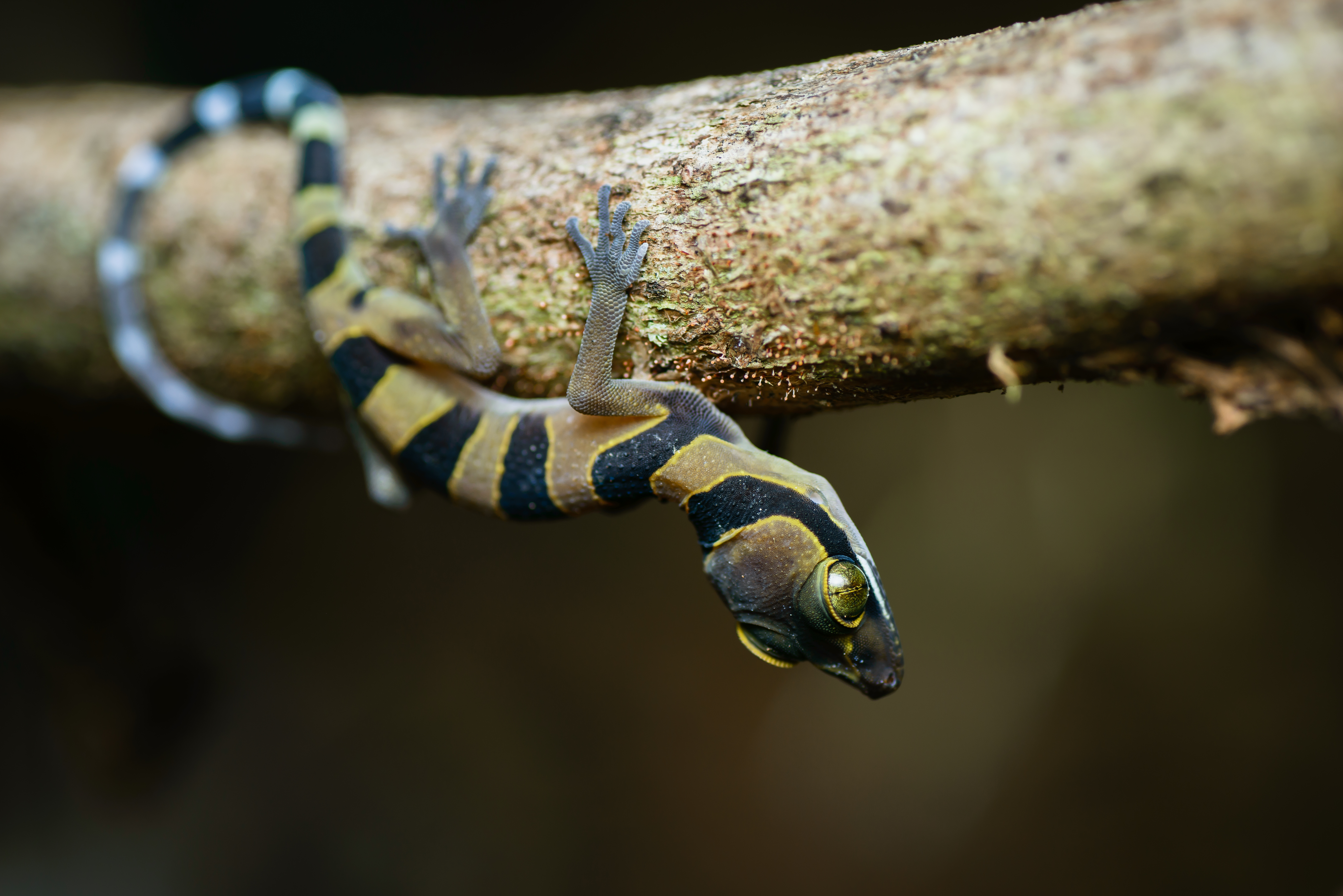
- Cyrtodactylus lekaguli, tuk-kai Boonsong bent-toed gecko, on a tree

Conservation status
- Least Concern (IUCN 3.1)

Scientific classification
- Kingdom: Animalia
- Phylum: Chordata
- Class: Reptilia
- Order: Squamata
- Suborder: Gekkota
- Family: Gekkonidae
- Genus: Cyrtodactylus
- Species: C. lekaguli

Binomial name
- Cyrtodactylus lekaguli L. Grismer, Wood, Quah, Anuar, Muin, Sumontha, Ahmad, Bauer, Wangkulangkul, J. Grismer & Pauwels, 2012

= Cyrtodactylus lekaguli =

Species of lizard

Cyrtodactylus lekaguli, also known commonly as the tuk-kai Boonsong bent-toed gecko, is a species of lizard in the family Gekkonidae. The species is endemic to Thailand.

== Etymology ==
The specific name, lekaguli, is in honor of Thai herpetologist Boonsong Lekagul (1907–1992).

== Geographic range ==
C. lekaguli is found in southern Thailand, in the provinces of Phang Nga, Suret Thani, and Trang.

== Habitat ==
The preferred natural habitats of C. lekaguli are forest and dry caves.

== Description ==
Large for its genus, C. lekaguli may attain a snout-to-vent length (SVL) of 10.4 cm (4.1 in). Adult females are slightly smaller than adult males, an example of sexual dimorphism.

== Reproduction ==
The mode of reproduction of C. lekaguli is unknown.
