= Sai Yok bent-toed gecko =

Scientific classification
- Kingdom: Animalia
- Phylum: Chordata
- Class: Reptilia
- Order: Squamata
- Suborder: Gekkota
- Family: Gekkonidae
- Genus: Cyrtodactylus
- Species: C. saiyok

Binomial name
- Cyrtodactylus saiyok Panitvong, Sumontha, Tunprasert, & Pauwels, 2017

Species of lizard

The Sai Yok bent-toed gecko (Cyrtodactylus saiyok) is a species of gecko that is endemic to western Thailand.
