= Wangkulangkul's bent-toed gecko =

Conservation status
- Least Concern (IUCN 3.1)

Scientific classification
- Kingdom: Animalia
- Phylum: Chordata
- Class: Reptilia
- Order: Squamata
- Suborder: Gekkota
- Family: Gekkonidae
- Genus: Cyrtodactylus
- Species: C. wangkulangkulae

Binomial name
- Cyrtodactylus wangkulangkulae Sumontha, Pauwels, Suwannakarn, Nutatheera & Sodob, 2014

Species of lizard

Wangkulangkul's bent-toed gecko (Cyrtodactylus wangkulangkulae) is a species of lizard in the family Gekkonidae. The species is endemic to Thailand.

== Etymology ==
The specific name, wangkulangkulae (feminine, genitive, singular), is in honor of Thai herpetologist Sansareeya Wangulangkul.

== Geographic range ==
C. wangkulangkulae is found in southern Thailand, in Satun Province.

== Habitat ==
The preferred natural habitat of C. wangkulangkulae is forest.

== Description ==
C. wangkulangkulae may attain a snout-to-vent length (SVL) of 7.7 cm (3.0 in).

== Reproduction ==
The mode of reproduction of C. wangkulangkulae is unknown.
