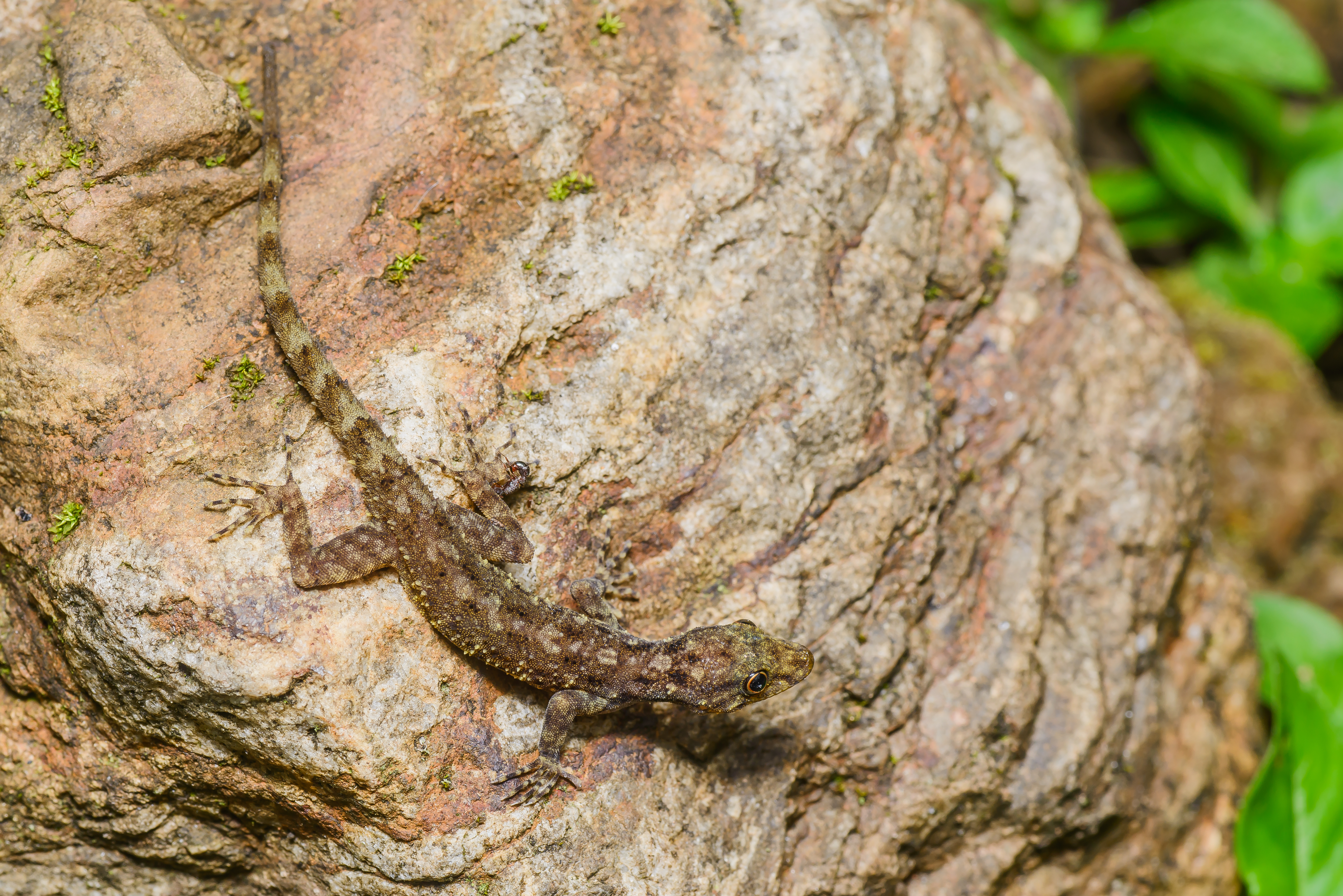

Scientific classification
- Kingdom: Animalia
- Phylum: Chordata
- Class: Reptilia
- Order: Squamata
- Suborder: Gekkota
- Family: Gekkonidae
- Genus: Cnemaspis
- Species: C. chanardi

Binomial name
- Cnemaspis chanardi Grismer, Sumontha, Cota, Grismer, Wood, Pauwels, & Kunya, 2010

= Cnemaspis chanardi =

Species of lizard

Cnemaspis chanardi, also known as Chan-ard's rock gecko, is a species of gecko endemic to Thailand.
