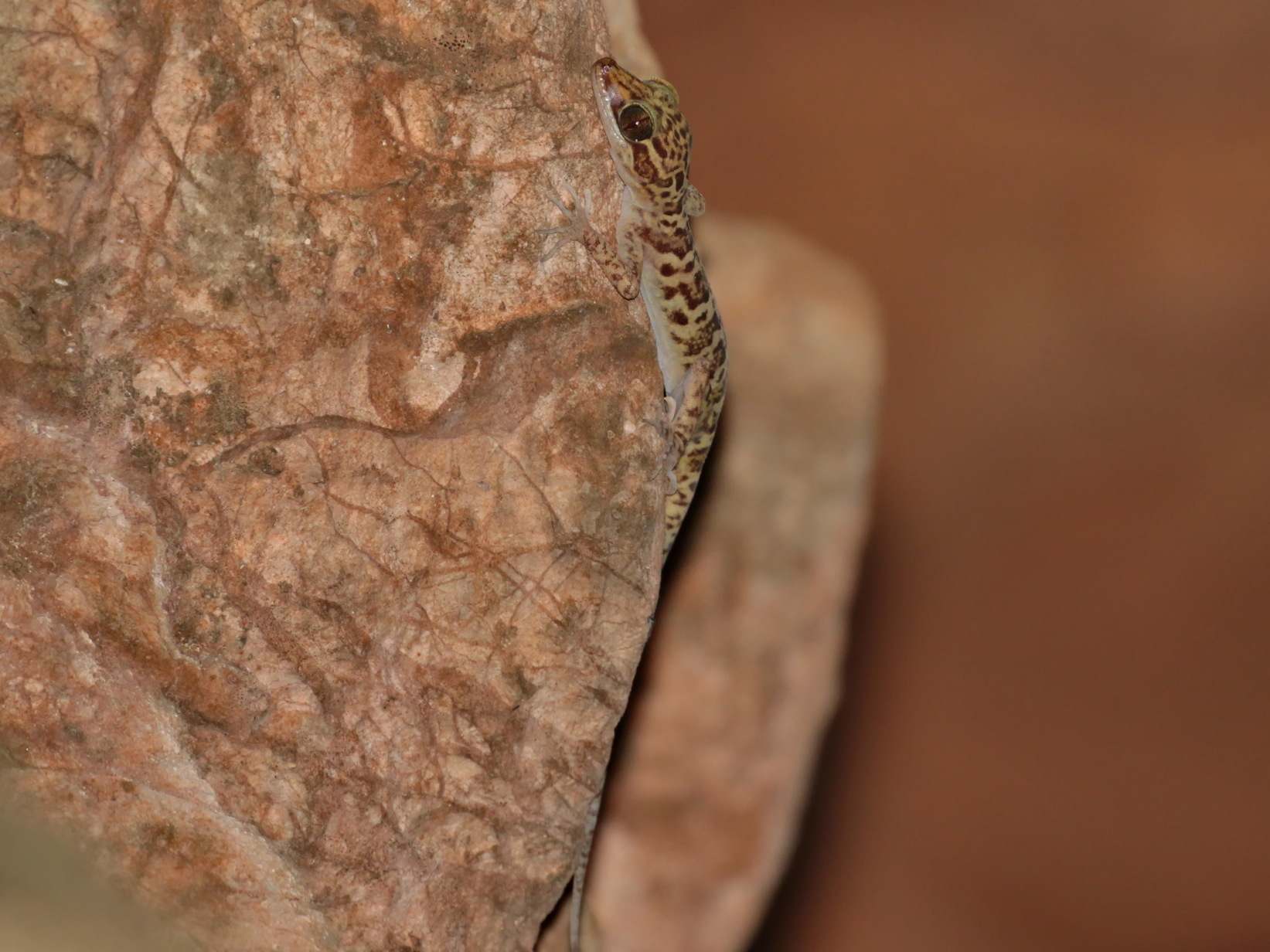

Conservation status
- Least Concern (IUCN 3.1)

Scientific classification
- Kingdom: Animalia
- Phylum: Chordata
- Class: Reptilia
- Order: Squamata
- Suborder: Gekkota
- Family: Gekkonidae
- Genus: Cyrtodactylus
- Species: C. kunyai

Binomial name
- Cyrtodactylus kunyai Pauwels, Sumontha, Keeratikiat & Phanamphon, 2014

= Kunya's bent-toed gecko =

Species of lizard

Kunya's bent-toed gecko (Cyrtodactylus kunyai) is a species of lizard in the family Gekkonidae. The species is endemic to Thailand.

== Etymology ==
The specific name, kunyai, is in honor of Thai herpetologist Kirati Kunya.

== Geographic range ==
C. kunyai is found in northeastern Thailand, in Loei Province.

== Habitat ==
The preferred natural habitat of C. kunyai is dry caves.

== Description ==
C. kunyai mat attain a snout-to-vent length (SVL) of 8.8 cm (3.5 in).

== Reproduction ==
The mode of reproduction of C. kunyai is unknown.
