= Cnemaspis narathiwatensis =

Scientific classification
- Kingdom: Animalia
- Phylum: Chordata
- Class: Reptilia
- Order: Squamata
- Suborder: Gekkota
- Family: Gekkonidae
- Genus: Cnemaspis
- Species: C. narathiwatensis

Binomial name
- Cnemaspis narathiwatensis Grismer, Sumontha, Cota, Grismer, Wood, Pauwels & Kunya, 2010

Species of lizard

Cnemaspis narathiwatensis, also known as the Narathiwat rock gecko, is a species of gecko endemic to Thailand.
