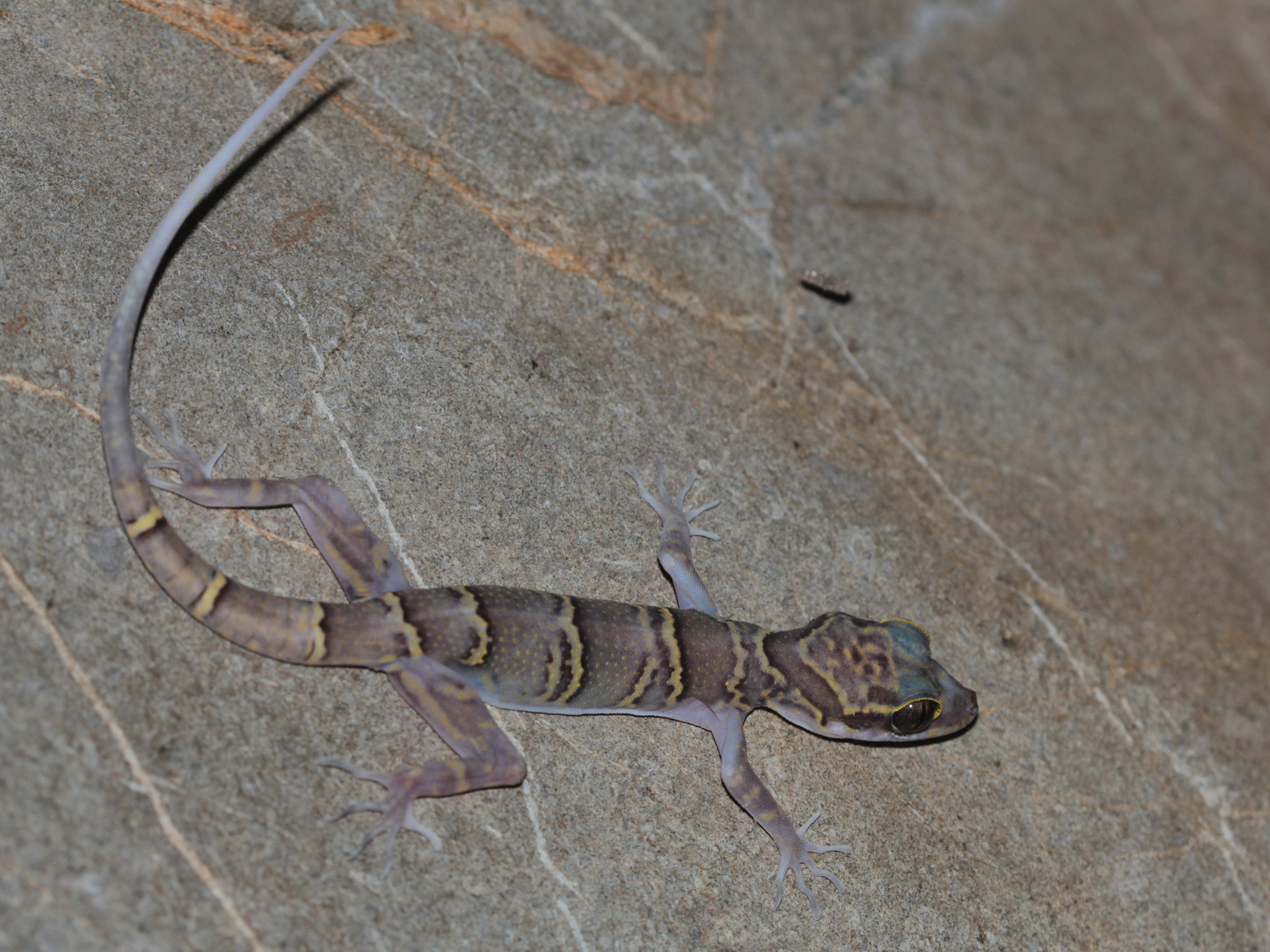

Conservation status
- Critically Endangered (IUCN 3.1)

Scientific classification
- Kingdom: Animalia
- Phylum: Chordata
- Class: Reptilia
- Order: Squamata
- Suborder: Gekkota
- Family: Gekkonidae
- Genus: Cyrtodactylus
- Species: C. chanhomeae

Binomial name
- Cyrtodactylus chanhomeae Bauer, Sumontha & Pauwels, 2003

= Cyrtodactylus chanhomeae =

Species of lizard

Cyrtodactylus chanhomeae is a species of gecko, a lizard in the family Gekkonidae. The species is endemic to Thailand.

== Etymology ==
The specific name, chanhomeae (genitive, feminine) is in honor of Thai herpetologist Lawan Chanhome. She specializes in studying the venomous snakes of Thailand.

== Geographic range ==
C. chanhomeae is found in central Thailand, in Saraburi Province.

== Habitat ==
The preferred natural habitat of C. chanhomeae is dry caves.

== Description ==
Medium-sized for its genus, C. chanhomae may attain a snout-to-vent length (SVL) of about 8 cm (3.1 in).

== Reproduction ==
C. chanhomeae is oviparous.
