= Sanook bent-toed gecko =

Scientific classification
- Kingdom: Animalia
- Phylum: Chordata
- Class: Reptilia
- Order: Squamata
- Suborder: Gekkota
- Family: Gekkonidae
- Genus: Cyrtodactylus
- Species: C. sanook

Binomial name
- Cyrtodactylus sanook Pauwels, Sumontha, Latinne, & Grismer, 2013

Species of lizard

The Sanook bent-toed gecko (Cyrtodactylus sanook) is a species of gecko that is endemic to southern Thailand.
