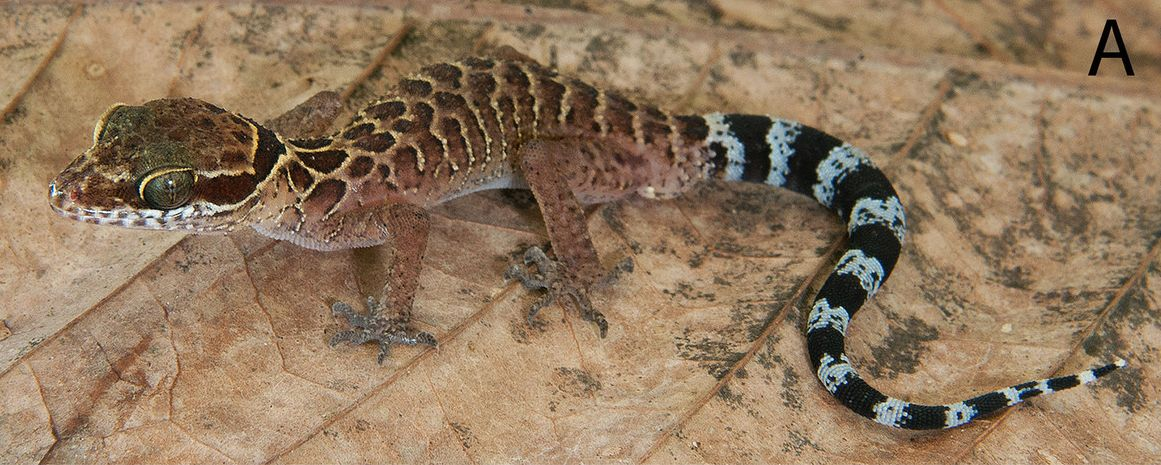

Scientific classification
- Kingdom: Animalia
- Phylum: Chordata
- Class: Reptilia
- Order: Squamata
- Suborder: Gekkota
- Family: Gekkonidae
- Genus: Cyrtodactylus
- Species: C. zebraicus

Binomial name
- Cyrtodactylus zebraicus (Taylor, 1962)

Synonyms
- Cyrtodactylus peguensis zebraicus Taylor, 1962

= Cyrtodactylus zebraicus =

Species of lizard

Cyrtodactylus zebraicus is a species of gecko that is found in Thailand. It was originally described as subspecies of Cyrtodactylus peguensis but appears to be more closely related to Cyrtodactylus oldhami instead.
