= Dumnui's bent-toed gecko =

Conservation status
- Least Concern (IUCN 3.1)

Scientific classification
- Kingdom: Animalia
- Phylum: Chordata
- Class: Reptilia
- Order: Squamata
- Suborder: Gekkota
- Family: Gekkonidae
- Genus: Cyrtodactylus
- Species: C. dumnuii

Binomial name
- Cyrtodactylus dumnuii Bauer, K. Kunya, Sumontha, Niyomwan, Pauwels, Chanhome & T. Kunya, 2010

Species of lizard

Dumnui's bent-toed gecko (Cyrtodactylus dumnuii) is a species of lizard in the family Gekkonidae. The species is endemic to Thailand.

== Etymology ==
The specific name, dumnuii, is in honor of Thai zoologist Sophon Dumnui.

== Geographic range ==
C. dumnuii is only known from its type locality, Phabartmaejon Cave in Mae Na, in Chiang Mai Province, Thailand

== Habitat ==
The preferred natural habitats of C. dumnuii are forest and dry caves. The holotype and paratype specimens of C. dumnuii were collected inside the entrance and up to 30 m (98 ft) into a limestone cave.

== Description ==
Adult males of C. dumnuii measure 81–84 mm (3.2–3.3 in) in snout-to-vent length (SVL), and adult females 76–84 mm (3.0–3.3 in) SVL.

== Reproduction ==
The mode of reproduction of C. dumnuii is unknown.
