= Thirakhupt's bent-toed gecko =

Conservation status
- Near Threatened (IUCN 3.1)

Scientific classification
- Kingdom: Animalia
- Phylum: Chordata
- Class: Reptilia
- Order: Squamata
- Suborder: Gekkota
- Family: Gekkonidae
- Genus: Cyrtodactylus
- Species: C. thirakhupti

Binomial name
- Cyrtodactylus thirakhupti Pauwels, Bauer, Sumontha & Chanhome, 2004

Species of lizard

Thirakhupt's bent-toed gecko (Cyrtodactylus thirakhupti) is a species of gecko, a lizard in the family Gekkonidae. The species is endemic to Thailand.

== Etymology ==
The specific name, thirakhupti, is in honor of Thai herpetologist Kumthorn Thirakhupt.

== Geographic range ==
C. thirakhupti is found in southern Thailand.

Type locality: Tham Khao Sonk [= Cave of Sonk Mountain], Thachana District, Surat Thani Province.

== Habitat ==
The preferred natural habitat of C. thirakhupti is caves.

== Description ==
Moderate-sized for its genus, Cyrtodactylus thirakhupti may attain a snout-to-vent length (SVL) of over 8 cm (3.1 in).

== Reproduction ==
C. thirakhupti is oviparous.
