= Tiger bent-toed gecko =

Scientific classification
- Kingdom: Animalia
- Phylum: Chordata
- Class: Reptilia
- Order: Squamata
- Suborder: Gekkota
- Family: Gekkonidae
- Genus: Cyrtodactylus
- Species: C. tigroides

Binomial name
- Cyrtodactylus tigroides Bauer, Sumontha, & Pauwels 2003

Species of lizard

The tiger bent-toed gecko (Cyrtodactylus tigroides) is a species of gecko that is endemic to Thailand.
