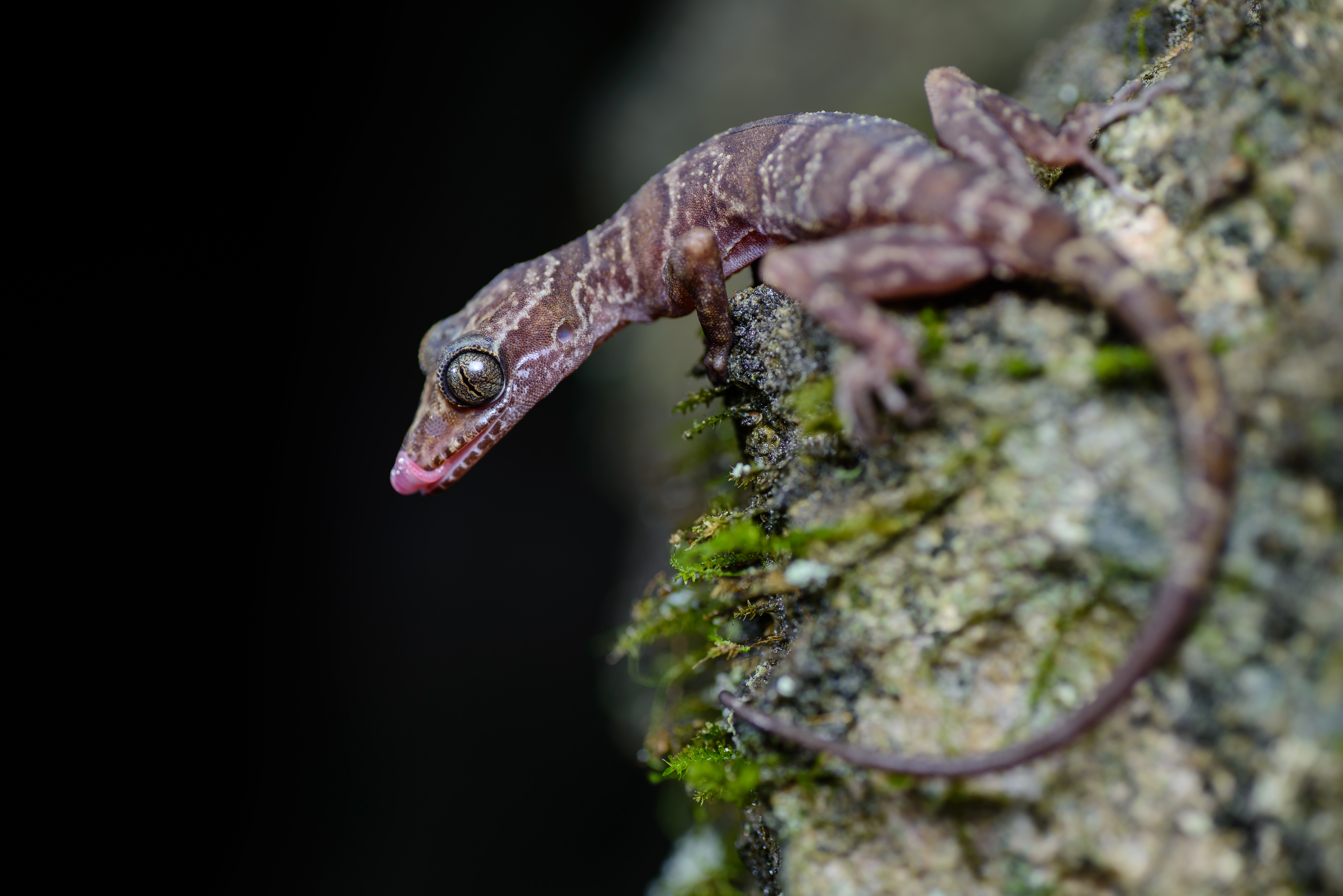

Conservation status
- Least Concern (IUCN 3.1)

Scientific classification
- Kingdom: Animalia
- Phylum: Chordata
- Class: Reptilia
- Order: Squamata
- Suborder: Gekkota
- Family: Gekkonidae
- Genus: Cyrtodactylus
- Species: C. sumonthai

Binomial name
- Cyrtodactylus sumonthai Bauer, Pauwels & Chanhome, 2002
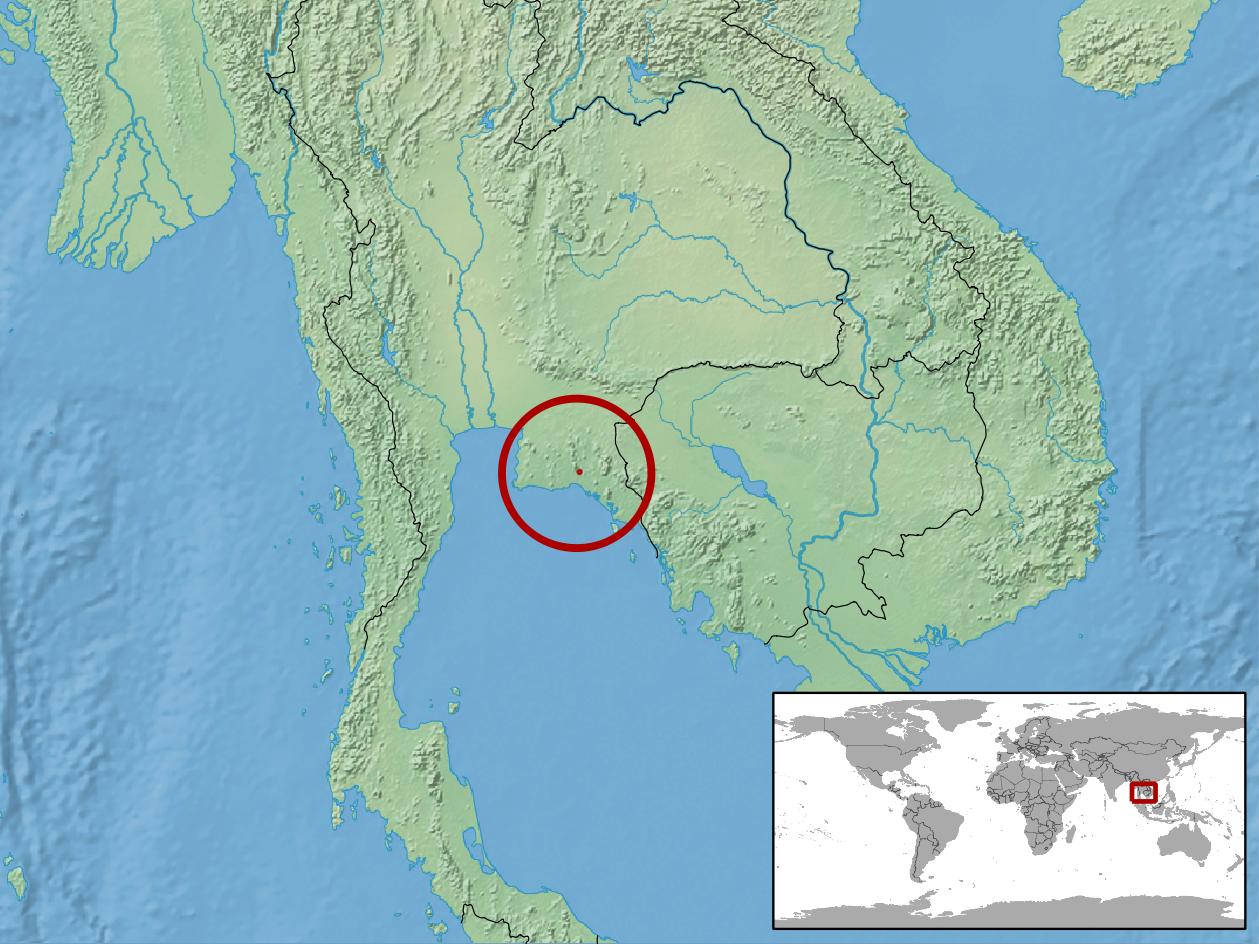

= Sumontha's gecko =

Species of lizard

Sumontha's gecko (Cyrtodactylus sumonthai) is a species of lizard in the family Gekkonidae. The species is endemic to Thailand.

== Etymology ==
The specific name, sumonthai, is in honor of Thai biologist Montri Sumontha.

== Geographic range ==
C. sumonthai is found in Rayong Province in eastern Thailand.

== Habitat ==
The preferred natural habitats of C. sumonthai are limestone caves and limestone outcrops.

== Reproduction ==
C. sumonthai is oviparous.
