= Cnemaspis kumpoli =

Conservation status
- Least Concern (IUCN 3.1)

Scientific classification
- Kingdom: Animalia
- Phylum: Chordata
- Class: Reptilia
- Order: Squamata
- Suborder: Gekkota
- Family: Gekkonidae
- Genus: Cnemaspis
- Species: C. kumpoli

Binomial name
- Cnemaspis kumpoli Taylor, 1963

Species of lizard

Cnemaspis kumpoli, also known commonly as Kumpol's rock gecko and the Trang Province gecko, is a species of lizard in the family Gekkonidae. The species is endemic to the Malay Peninsula.

== Etymology ==
The specific name, kumpoli, is in honor of Nai Kumpol Isarankura, who was Curator of Zoological Specimens at Chulalongkorn University in Bangkok, Thailand.

== Geographic range ==
C. kumpoli is found in West Malaysia (Perlis, Selangor) and southern Thailand (Satun, Songkhla, Trang).

== Habitat ==
The preferred natural habitat of C. kumpoli is rocky areas of forest.

== Reproduction ==
C. kumpoli is oviparous. Clutch size is two eggs.
