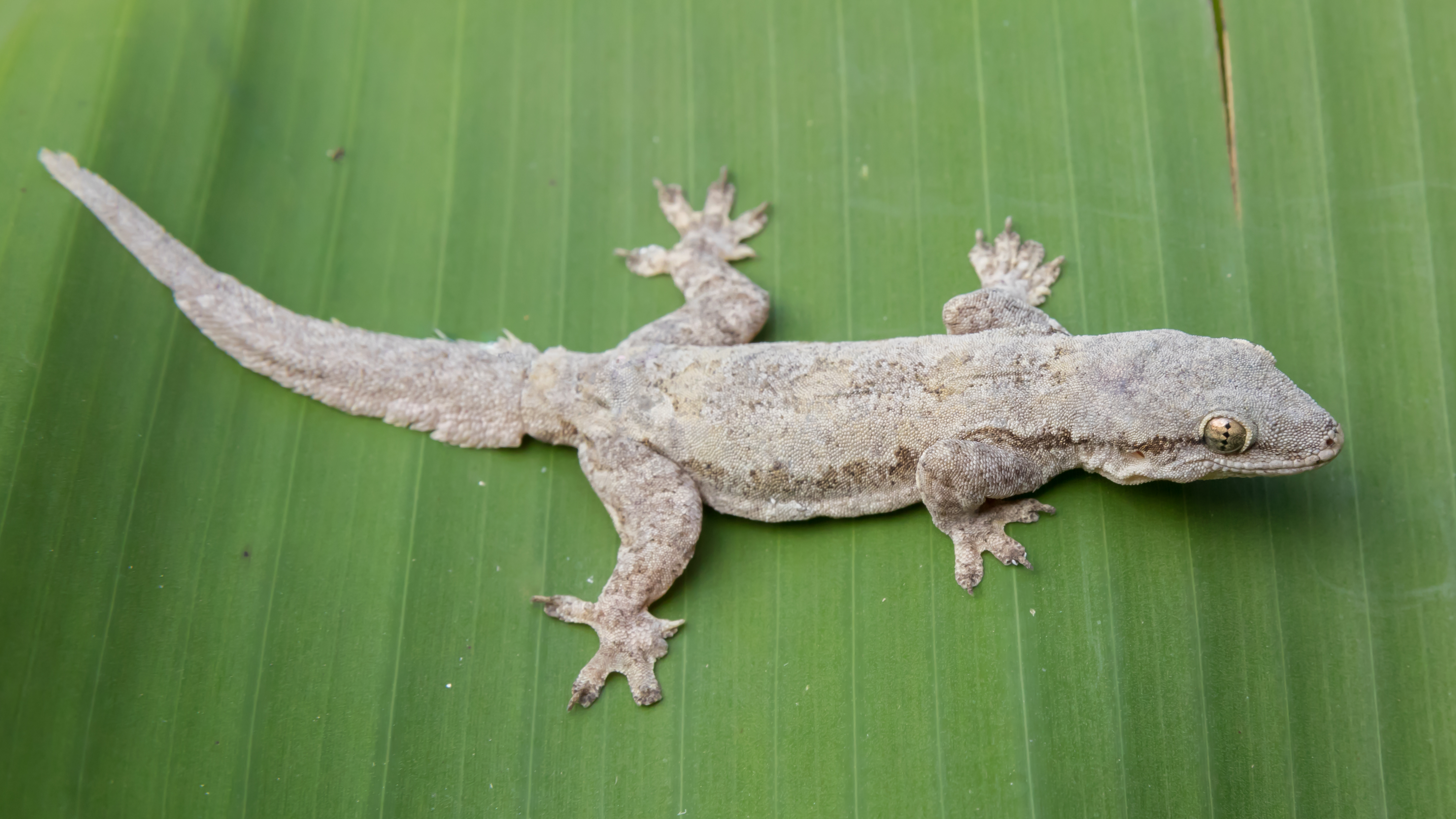

Conservation status
- Least Concern (IUCN 3.1)

Scientific classification
- Kingdom: Animalia
- Phylum: Chordata
- Class: Reptilia
- Order: Squamata
- Suborder: Gekkota
- Family: Gekkonidae
- Genus: Hemidactylus
- Species: H. platyurus

Binomial name
- Hemidactylus platyurus (Schneider, 1797)

Synonyms
- List: Cosymbotes platyurus; Cosymbotus platyurus; Crossurus platyurus; Gehyra platyurus; Gekko platyurus; Platyurus platyurus; Hoplopodion platyurus; Lacerta schneideriana; Lacerta tjitja; Lomatodactylus platyurus; Nycteridium himalayanum; Nycteridium platyurus; Nycteridium schneideri; Hemidactylus marginatus; Hemidactylus nepalensis; Platyurus marginatus; Platyurus platyurus; Platyurus schneiderianus; Stellio platyurus

= Flat-tailed house gecko =

Species of lizard

The flat-tailed house gecko (Hemidactylus platyurus), also known as the frilled house gecko or Asian house gecko, is a species of Gekkonidae native to southeastern and southern Asia. The species is sometimes classified under the genus Cosymbotus.

== Description ==
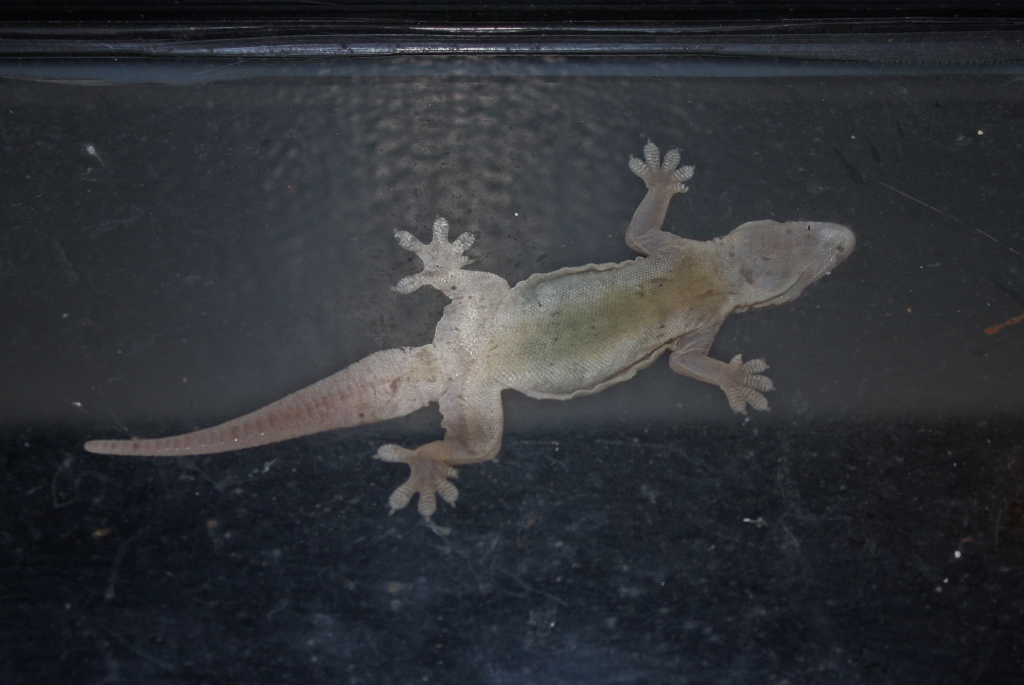
Underside of the gecko showing webbed-toes and fringes

These geckos exhibit patagia in the trunk, tail, and femoral region that are employed in gliding. Similarly to gliding geckos of the genus Gekko (formerly Ptychozoon), these patagia are derived from expansion of fat in the sides.

=== Identification ===
Snout longer than the distance between the eye and the ear opening, one time and a half the diameter of the orbit; forehead concave; ear-opening small, oval, oblique. Rostral four-sided, not twice as broad as high, with median cleft above; nostril bordered by the rostral, the first labial and three nasals. Nine to eleven upper and seven or eight lower labials; mental large. triangular or pentagonal; two pair of chin-shields, the median pair large, in contact with each other, the posterior pair small, sometimes separated from the labials. Body depressed, covered above with uniform small granules, largest on the snout; a dermal expansion from axilla to groin and another along the posterior side of the hind limb. Ventral scales cycloid, imbricate. Male with an uninterrupted series of 34–36 femoral pores. Tail depressed, flat inferiorly, with sharp denticulated lateral edge, covered above with uniform small granules, below with a median series of transversely dilated plates. Limbs moderate, depressed; digits strongly dilated, about half-webbed, inner well developed; 3 to 6 lamellae under the inner, 7 to 9 under the median digits. Grey above, marbled with darker grey; generally a dark streak from eye to shoulder. Lower parts white. Length of head and body 61 mm (2.4 in); tail 66 mm (2.6 in).

== Distribution ==
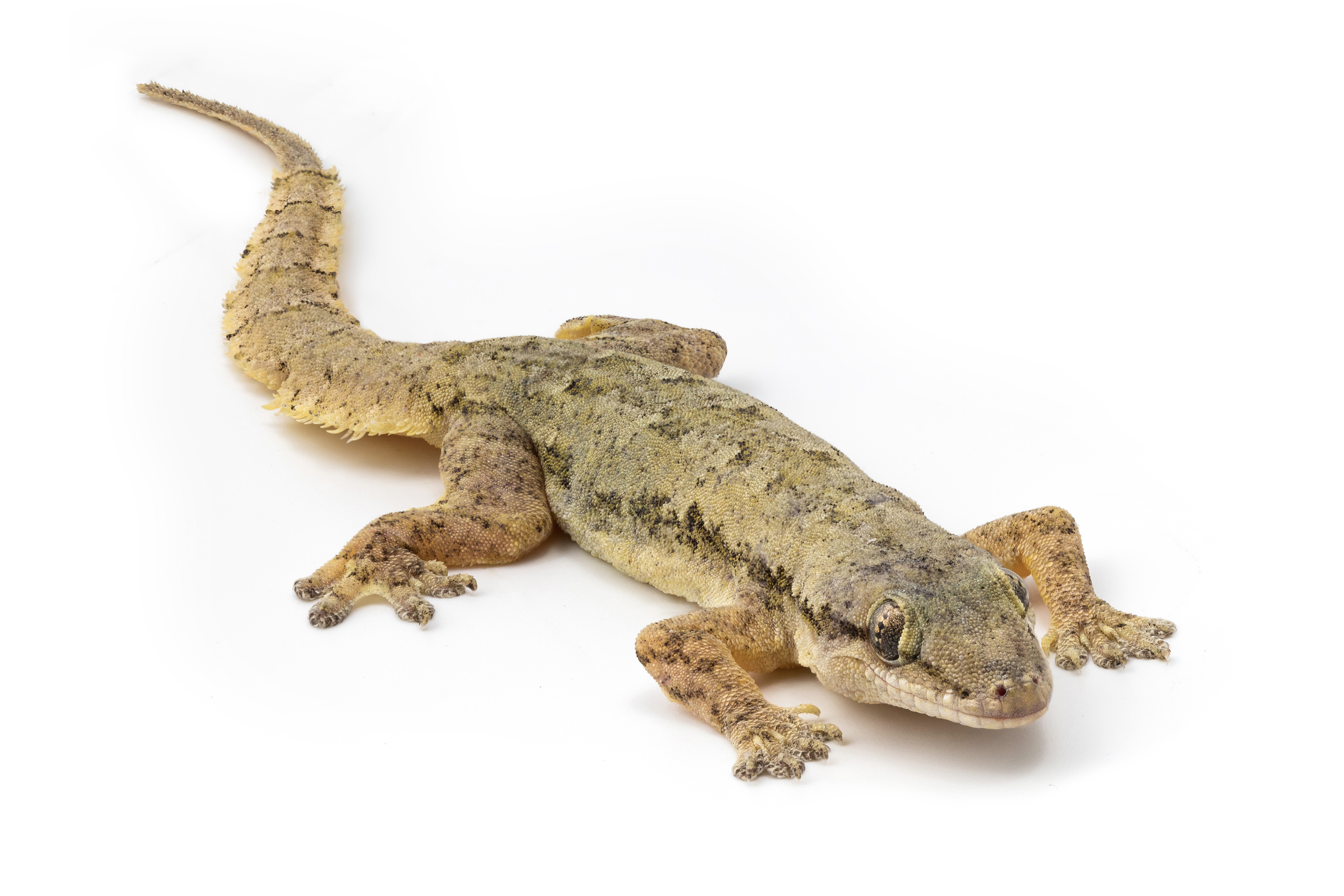
In Laos

It is found in Bangladesh, India (Darjeeling, Sikkim, Nicobar Islands), Nepal, Bhutan, China (Guangdong, southeastern Tibet), Taiwan, Sri Lanka, Thailand, Cambodia, Malaysia (including Tioman), Burma, Vietnam, Indonesia (Sumatra, Java, Sulawesi, Lombok, Sumbawa, Flores, Irian), and the Philippines (Palawan, Calamian Islands, Panay, Luzon).

They are also introduced in Florida (Pinellas, Alachua, Lee, Broward, and Miami-Dade counties) in the USA.

== As a pet ==
These geckos are frequently found in the pet trade, including corporate chain stores, usually identified only as "house gecko". While there are other species of gecko available under the same common name, the Hemidactylus platyurus is easily identified by the flaps of skin along its sides, making them resemble a miniature flying gecko (genus Gekko). They are easily maintained in a terrarium with frequent misting and insect prey, but they are not easy to handle. Also, herpetoculturists often use this species in addition to anoles as a feeder lizard for some species of snakes, especially Asian green vine snakes (Ahaetulla prasina).
