= Cyrtodactylus angularis =

Scientific classification
- Kingdom: Animalia
- Phylum: Chordata
- Class: Reptilia
- Order: Squamata
- Suborder: Gekkota
- Family: Gekkonidae
- Genus: Cyrtodactylus
- Species: C. angularis

Binomial name
- Cyrtodactylus angularis (M.A. Smith, 1921)

Synonyms
- Gymnodactylus peguensis var. angularis M.A. Smith, 1921; Gymnodactylus angularis — M.A. Smith, 1935; Cyrtodactylus angularis — Underwood, 1954

Species of lizard

Cyrtodactylus angularis, also known commonly as the angulated bow-fingered gecko or the angled forest gecko, is a species of lizard in the family Gekkonidae. The species is endemic to Thailand.

== Geographic range ==
C. angularis is known from Saraburi Province, Thailand.

== Reproduction ==
C. angularis is oviparous.
