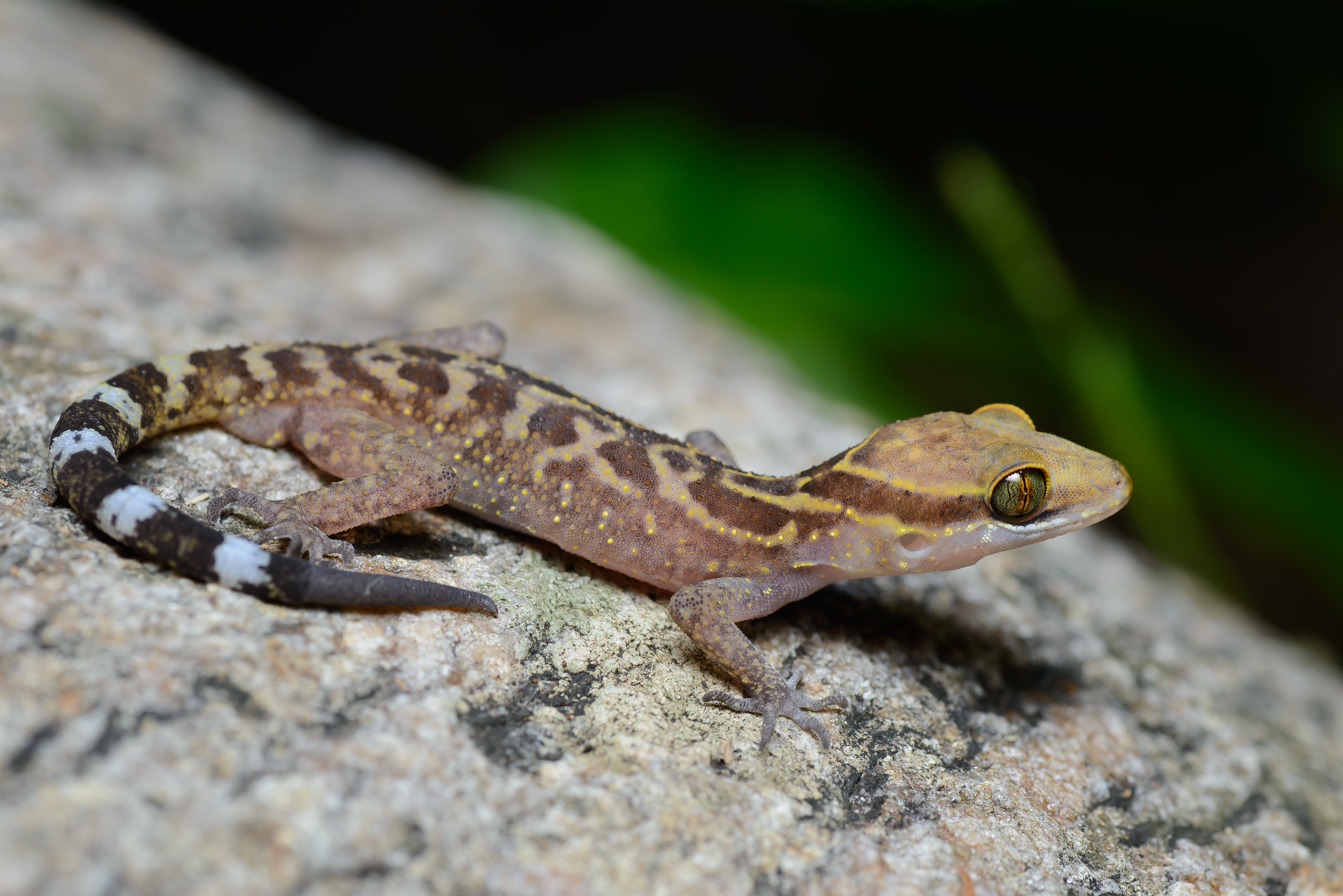

Scientific classification
- Kingdom: Animalia
- Phylum: Chordata
- Class: Reptilia
- Order: Squamata
- Suborder: Gekkota
- Family: Gekkonidae
- Genus: Cyrtodactylus
- Species: C. phetchaburiensis

Binomial name
- Cyrtodactylus phetchaburiensis Pawels, Sumontha, & Bauer, 2016

= Cyrtodactylus phetchaburiensis =

Species of lizard

Cyrtodactylus phetchaburiensis is a species of gecko that is endemic to Thailand.
