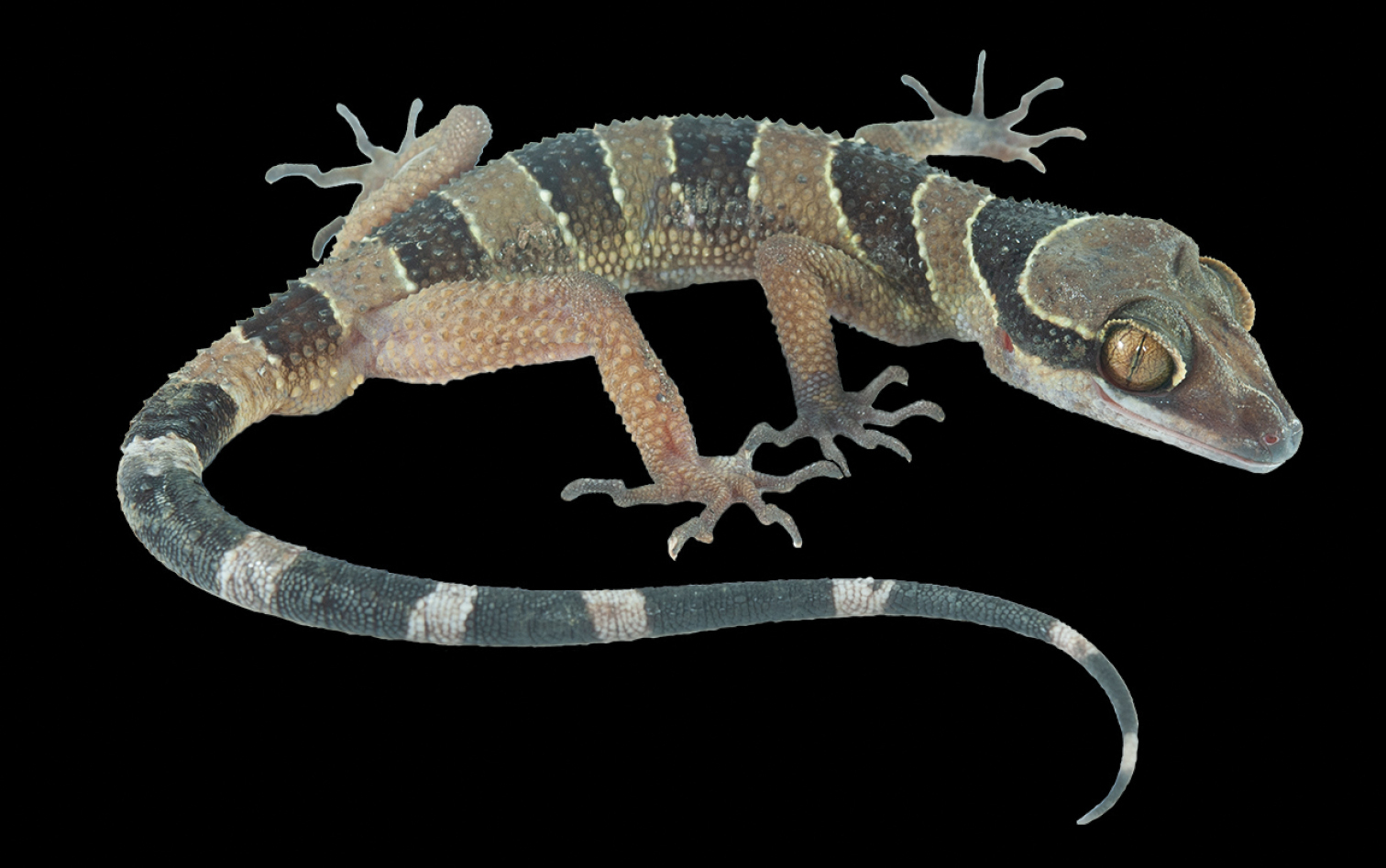

Scientific classification
- Kingdom: Animalia
- Phylum: Chordata
- Class: Reptilia
- Order: Squamata
- Suborder: Gekkota
- Family: Gekkonidae
- Genus: Cyrtodactylus
- Species: C. macrotuberculatus

Binomial name
- Cyrtodactylus macrotuberculatus Grismer & Ahmad, 2008

= Cyrtodactylus macrotuberculatus =

Species of lizard

Cyrtodactylus macrotuberculatus, also known as the tuberculate bent-toed gecko or the large tubercled bent-toed gecko, is a species of gecko that is endemic to western Malaysia.
