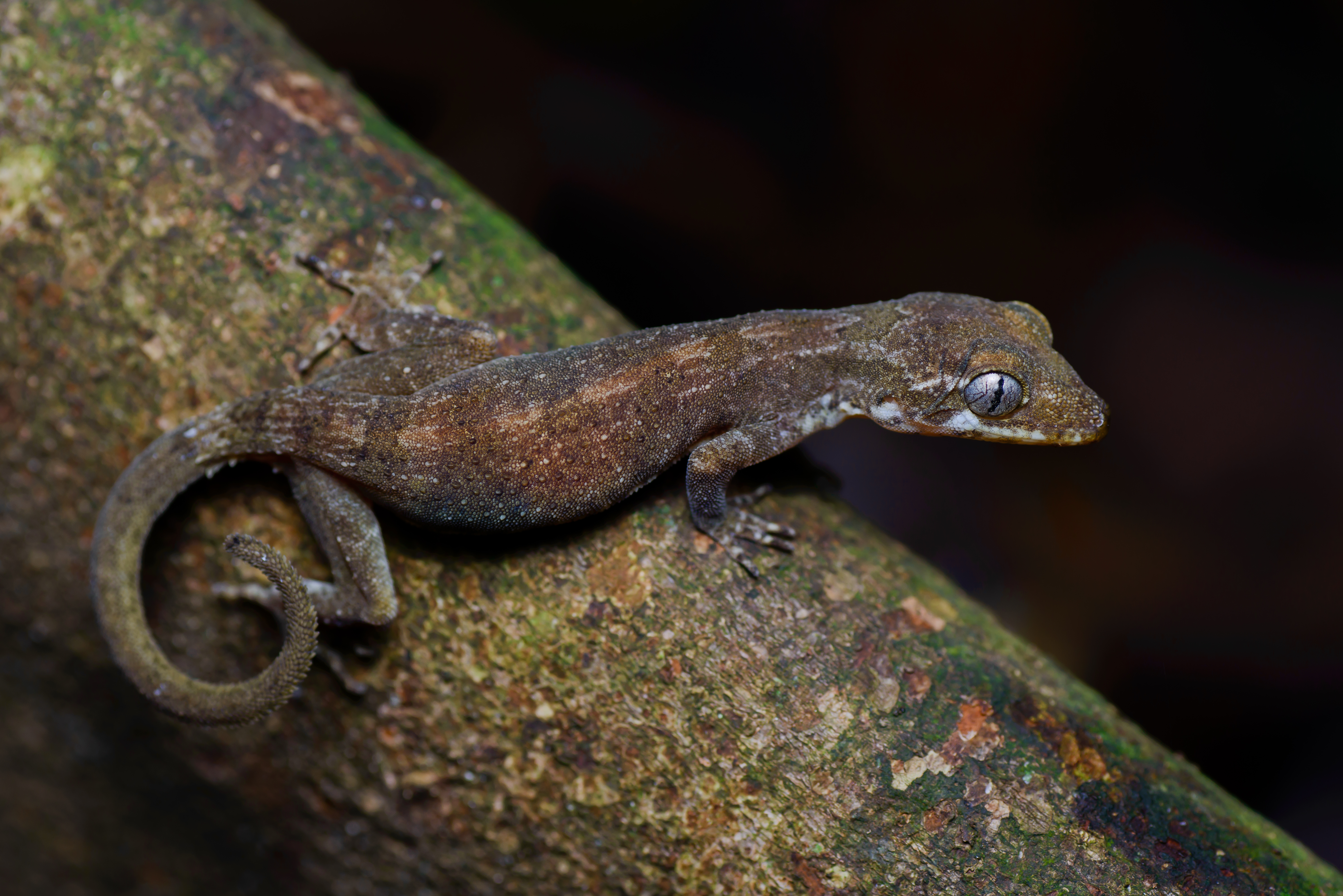

Scientific classification
- Kingdom: Animalia
- Phylum: Chordata
- Class: Reptilia
- Order: Squamata
- Suborder: Gekkota
- Family: Gekkonidae
- Genus: Cyrtodactylus
- Species: C. brevipalmatus

Binomial name
- Cyrtodactylus brevipalmatus (M.A. Smith, 1923)

Synonyms
- Gymnodactylus brevipalmatus M.A. Smith, 1923; Cyrtodactylus brevipalmatus — Taylor, 1963

= Cyrtodactylus brevipalmatus =

Species of lizard

Cyrtodactylus brevipalmatus, also known commonly as the Kampuchea bow-fingered gecko or the short-hand forest gecko, is a species of lizard in the family Gekkonidae. The species is endemic to Thailand.

== Geographic range ==
C. brevipalmatus is known from Nakhon Si Thammarat Province, Phetchaburi Province, and Phuket Province, Thailand.

== Reproduction ==
C. brevipalmatus is oviparous.
