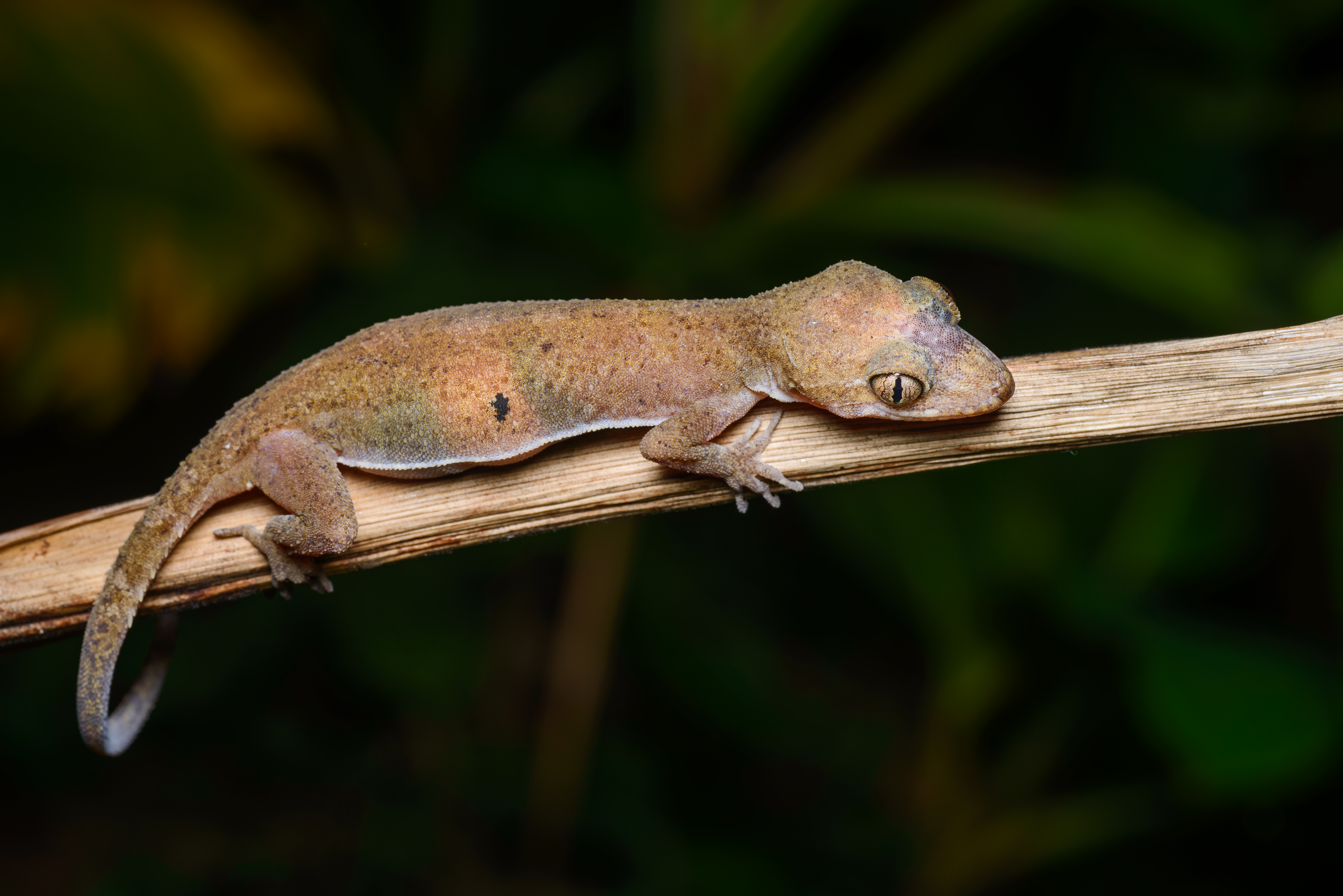

Scientific classification
- Kingdom: Animalia
- Phylum: Chordata
- Class: Reptilia
- Order: Squamata
- Suborder: Gekkota
- Family: Gekkonidae
- Genus: Cyrtodactylus
- Species: C. interdigitalis

Binomial name
- Cyrtodactylus interdigitalis Ulber, 1993

Synonyms
- Cyrtodactylus interdigitalis Ulber, 1993; Gymnodactylus brevipalmatus Smith, 1930; Cyrtodactylus interdigitalis — Chan-Ard et al. 1999; Cyrtodactylus (Cyrtodactylus) interdigitalis — Rösler 2000

= Skin-toe forest gecko =

Species of lizard

The skin-toe forest gecko (Cyrtodactylus interdigitalis) is a species of gecko found in Phetchabun and Loei provinces of Thailand as well in Laos.
