= Species nova =

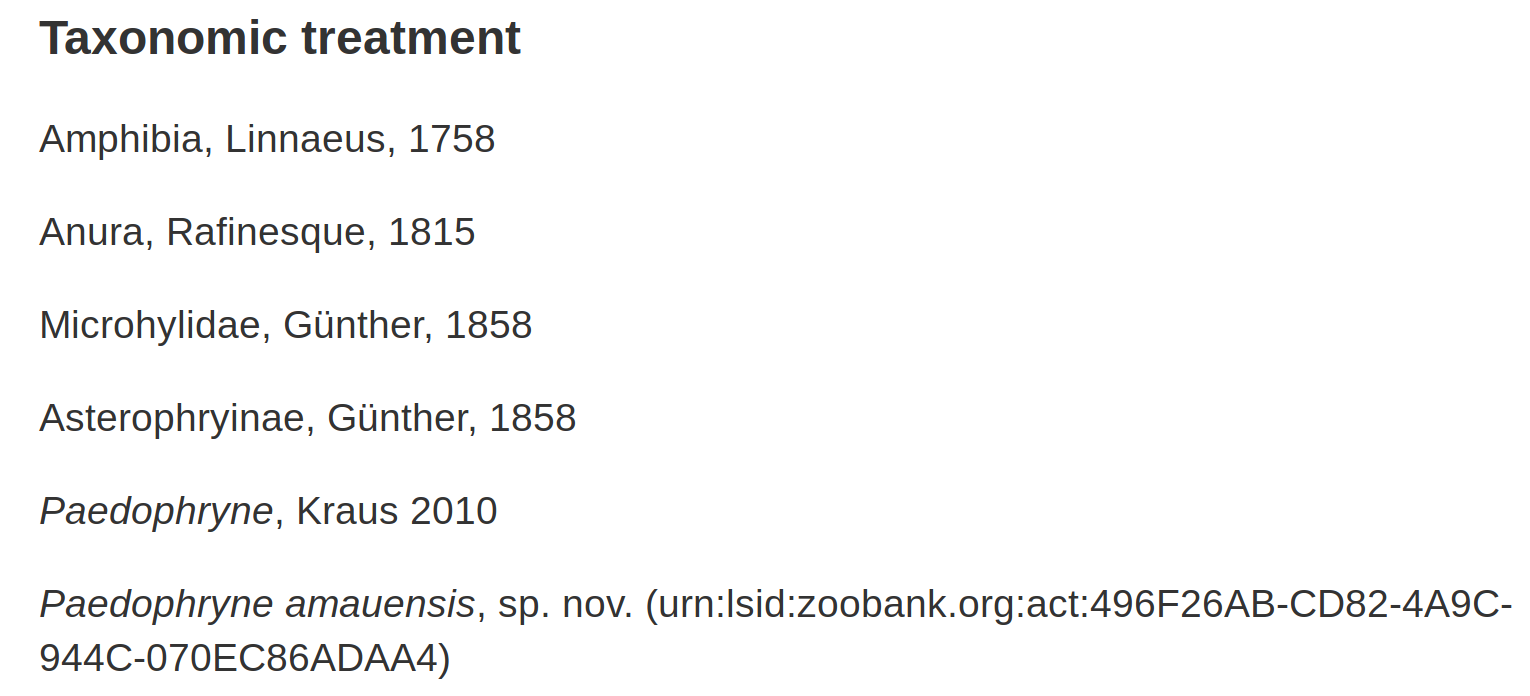
Taxon treatment for Paedophryne amauensis sp. nov.

In biological taxonomy, a species nova (plural: species novae; abbreviation: sp. nov. plural abbreviation: spp. nov.) is a new species. The phrase is Latin, and is used after a binomial name that is being published for the first time. The equivalent for a new genus name is genus novum, and familia nova for a biological family.

An example is the species of miniature frog, Paedophryne amauensis, originally described as Paedophryne amauensis sp. nov. in PLOS ONE in 2012.

The term should not be confused with combinatio nova, used when a previously named taxon is moved to a different genus or species, or its rank is changed.

== See also ==
- Glossary of scientific naming
- Species description
