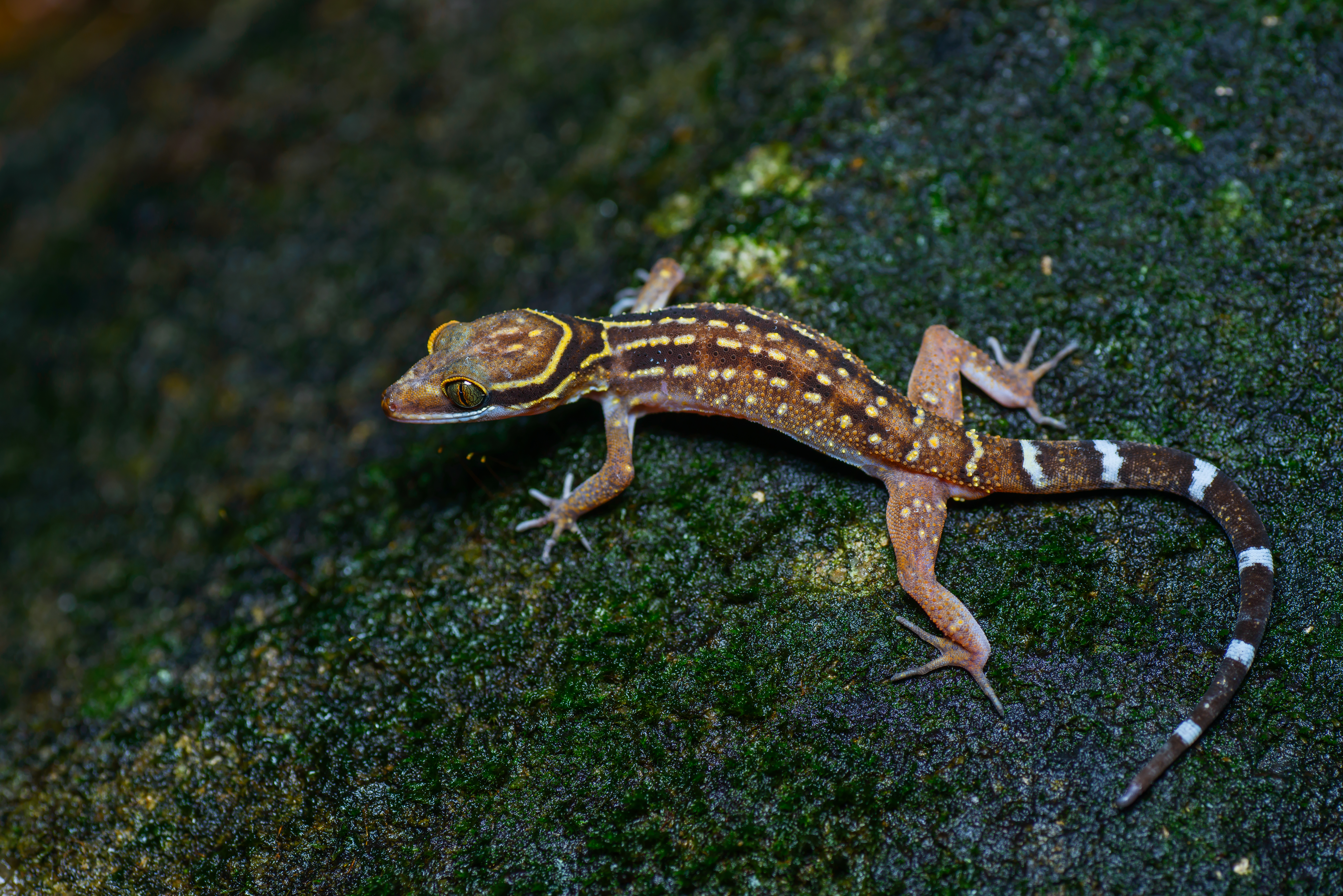
- Cyrtodactylus oldhami

Conservation status
- Least Concern (IUCN 3.1)

Scientific classification
- Kingdom: Animalia
- Phylum: Chordata
- Class: Reptilia
- Order: Squamata
- Suborder: Gekkota
- Family: Gekkonidae
- Genus: Cyrtodactylus
- Species: C. oldhami

Binomial name
- Cyrtodactylus oldhami (Theobald, 1876)

Synonyms
- Gymnodactylus oldhami Theobald, 1876; Gymnodactylus oldhami — Boulenger, 1885; Cyrtodactylus oldhami — Taylor, 1963; Cyrtodactylus oldhami — Manthey & W. Grossmann, 1997; Cyrtodactylus (Cyrtodactylus) oldhami — Rösler, 2000

= Oldham's bow-fingered gecko =

Species of lizard

Oldham's bow-fingered gecko (Cyrtodactylus oldhami) is a species of lizard in the family Gekkonidae. The species is native to Myanmar and Thailand.

== Etymology ==
Both the specific name, oldhami, and the common name, Oldham's bow-fingered gecko, are in honor of English plant collector Richard Oldham (1837–1864).

== Geographic range ==
Cyrtodactylus oldhami is found in southern Myanmar and southern Thailand.

== Habitat ==
The preferred natural habitat of Cyrtodactylus oldhami is forest, at altitudes from sea level to 150 m (490 ft).

== Description ==
Cyrtodactylus oldhami may attain a snout-to-vent length (SVL) of 6.5 cm (2.6 in), plus a tail 7.5 cm (3.0 in) long.

== Reproduction ==
Cyrtodactylus oldhami is oviparous.
