= Olivier Sylvain Gérard Pauwels =

Belgian zoologist (born 1971)

Olivier Pauwels
- Born: Olivier Sylvain Gérard Pauwels; 1 September 1971; Asse, Flemish Brabant, Belgium
- Education: Université libre de Bruxelles
- Known for: Taxonomy and conservation of reptiles and amphibians of Africa and Southeast Asia
- Scientific career
- Fields: Herpetology, Biology
- Workplaces: Royal Belgian Institute of Natural Sciences

Olivier Sylvain Gérard Pauwels (born 1 September 1971) is a Belgian biologist whose research focuses on herpetology.

== Biography ==
During his childhood in Groot-Bijgaarden near Brussels, Pauwels developed a passion for zoology. He spent much of his school holidays at the Royal Museum for Central Africa in Tervuren, where he learned the methods of morphology and systematic herpetology under the taxonomist Danny Meirte. This led him to study biosciences at the Université libre de Bruxelles, where he earned his master’s degree.

Pauwels has specialized in environmental impact assessment and environmental project management within industry. From 2001 to mid-2011 he lived in Gabon. In his various roles — including as training manager for WWF Gabon, head of the Smithsonian Institution’s Gabon Program, and coordinator for environmental, social and health impact assessments for Shell Gabon — he had the opportunity to undertake scientific expeditions into remote and unexplored rainforests and live among the Pygmies. Through numerous articles and books, he contributed to a better understanding of Gabon’s rich and threatened biodiversity.

From mid-2011 to 2015, Pauwels directed environmental monitoring programs in Kazakhstan for a major oil consortium. Working under extreme weather conditions in many remote onshore and offshore areas, he gained extensive knowledge of the ecology and biodiversity of the Eurasian steppes and the Caspian Sea.

In addition to his industrial work in environmental project management, bio-monitoring, and environmental and health impact assessment, Pauwels is involved in various biodiversity research projects. His scientific work mainly focuses on the taxonomy, phylogeny, conservation and ecology of reptiles and amphibians. He occasionally studies other taxonomic groups such as insects, mammals, fish, and birds, and also works in other disciplines such as ethnobiology and archaeozoology.

Among Pauwels’s research projects are contributions to a monograph on the biodiversity and ecosystems of the Ogooué Delta in Gabon (with Tariq Stévart of the Missouri Botanical Garden and Jean Pierre Vande Weghe of Gabon’s Agence Nationale des Parcs Nationaux); studies on the systematics and phylogeny of Southeast Asian geckos (with Aaron M. Bauer of Villanova University, Larry Lee Grismer of La Sierra University, Roman Nazarov and Nikolai Poyarkov of Lomonosov Moscow State University, and Montri Sumontha of the Ranong Marine Fisheries Station); the zoogeography of Gabonese amphibians (with Piero Carlino of the Museo di Storia Naturale del Salento); research on the possible impacts of invasive reptiles in Spain (with Vicente Sancho of the Asociación Herpetológica Española); and the study of vertebrate remains from prehistoric excavation sites in northwestern Kazakhstan (with Nursultan Bairov of the Aqtöbe Regional Museum).

Since 1996, Pauwels has been a scientific collaborator at the Royal Belgian Institute of Natural Sciences in Brussels. He serves on the editorial boards of the African Journal of Ecology and the Thailand Natural History Museum Journal.

Since 2005, he has contributed to the IUCN Red List of Threatened Species and the Global Amphibian Assessment of the IUCN.

Pauwels is the author or co-author of the formal descriptions of more than 75 reptile species (many of them geckos) from the Malay Peninsula, Thailand, Indonesia, Singapore, Cambodia, Laos, and Vietnam; 12 amphibian species from West Africa and Central Africa; and four insect species from Malaysia, New Guinea, and Australia.

== Eponyms ==
Species named in honour of Pauwels include:

- The orchid Bulbophyllum pauwelsianum from Gabon
- The blind snake Letheobia pauwelsi from Gabon
- The beetle Nitorus pauwelsi from the Democratic Republic of the Congo
- The true bug Taedia pauwelsi from French Guiana
