= Bronchocela celebensis =

Scientific classification
- Domain: Eukaryota
- Kingdom: Animalia
- Phylum: Chordata
- Class: Reptilia
- Order: Squamata
- Suborder: Iguania
- Family: Agamidae
- Genus: Bronchocela
- Species: B. celebensis

Binomial name
- Bronchocela celebensis JE Gray, 1845

Species of lizard

Bronchocela celebensis, the Sulawesi bloodsucker, is a species of lizard. It is endemic to Indonesia. It is closely related to Bronchocela jubata and other lizards of the Bronchocela genus.

== Appearance ==
This species is green with a small frill on the top of the head.
