= Anna Klein (painter) =

German painter (1883–1941)

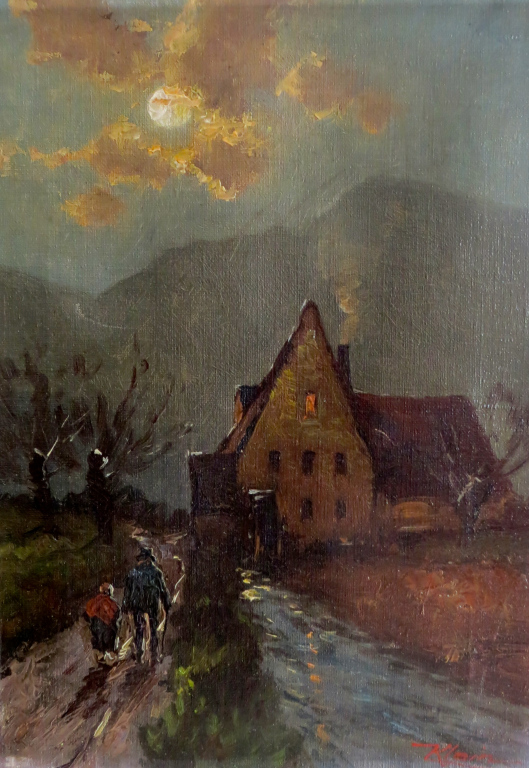
On the Way Home

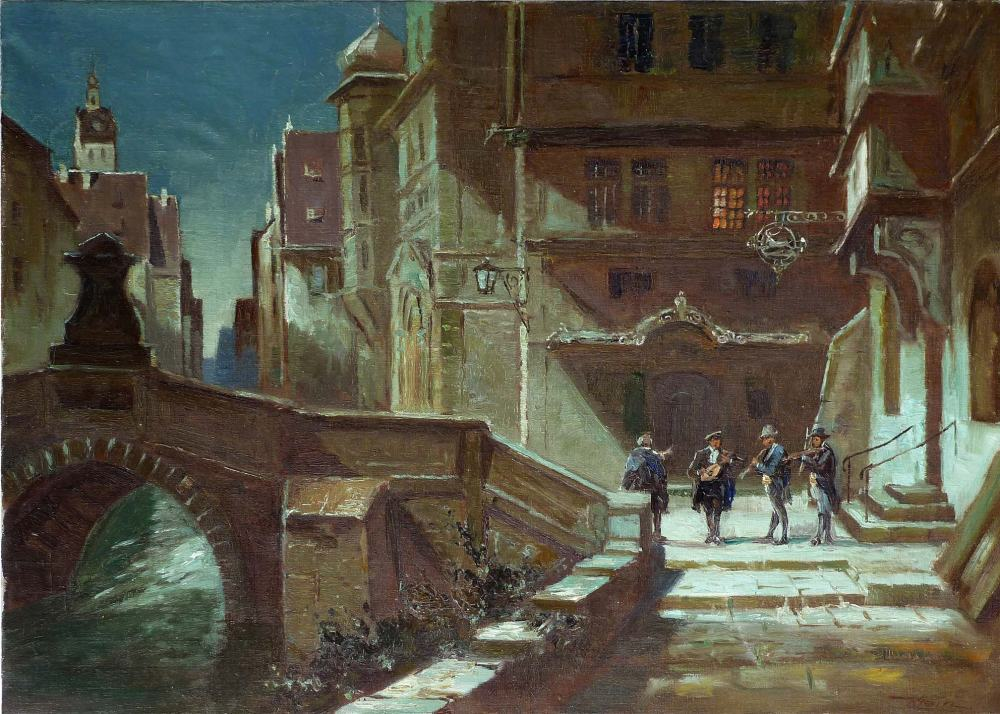
Musicians in Oldtown, Bamberg

Anna Klein (16 February 1883 in Nuremberg – 25 November 1941 in Kaunas) was a German landscape, animal and genre painter. She specialized in motifs from Upper Bavaria and Tyrol and designed many utilitarian items such as labels, bookplates and postcards in addition to her canvases. A large number of her paintings may be found at the Gemäldegalerie Dachau, where a retrospective was held in 2008.

== Biography ==
She was born to a Jewish wine and hops merchant who had been converted to Protestantism. Anna herself became a convert to Catholicism at an early age. In 1900, she went to the artists' colony in Dachau, where she became a pupil at the private school of Hans von Hayek. After that, she studied at a private school in Karlsruhe and completed her basic studies at the Damenakademie in Munich, operated by the Münchner Künstlerinnenverein, an association of women artists, where her instructors were Max Feldbauer and Julius Diez. In 1906, she went to the Netherlands to work a bit more with Hayek.

Two years later, she participated in an anatomy course taught by Franz Marc. One of the few photographs of her was taken at that time, with Marc and his future wife Bertha Marie Franck. In 1910, she graduated from the Königliche Kunstgewerbeschule München.

For a time, she worked as a private drawing teacher in Munich then, together with her friend, Elisabeth Troll, established her own school. In 1919, 1920 and 1922, she participated in exhibitions at the Glaspalast. A major solo exhibition was held in Berlin in 1927.

In 1933, following the Nazi seizure of power, she was forced to close the school. Despite having suffered from rheumatism for many years, she was assigned to work in a mattress factory. As a Jew, she was not allowed to use public transportation, so she had to walk from her home on the west side of the city to Haidhausen and back every day. She was taken to Kaunas and executed in the Ninth Fort massacres of November 1941. Some sources erroneously give her place of death as Theresienstadt.
