= Bronchocela vietnamensis =

Conservation status
- Vulnerable (IUCN 3.1)

Scientific classification
- Kingdom: Animalia
- Phylum: Chordata
- Class: Reptilia
- Order: Squamata
- Suborder: Iguania
- Family: Agamidae
- Genus: Bronchocela
- Species: B. vietnamensis

Binomial name
- Bronchocela vietnamensis Hallermann & Orlov, 2005

Species of lizard

Bronchocela vietnamensis is a species of lizard. It is endemic to Vietnam.
