= Bronchocela cyanopalpebra =

Scientific classification
- Kingdom: Animalia
- Phylum: Chordata
- Class: Reptilia
- Order: Squamata
- Suborder: Iguania
- Family: Agamidae
- Genus: Bronchocela
- Species: B. cyanopalpebra

Binomial name
- Bronchocela cyanopalpebra Chandramouli, Adhikari, Amarasinghe, & Abinawanto, 2023

Species of lizard

Bronchocela cyanopalpebra is a species of lizard. It is endemic to India on the Nicobar Islands.
