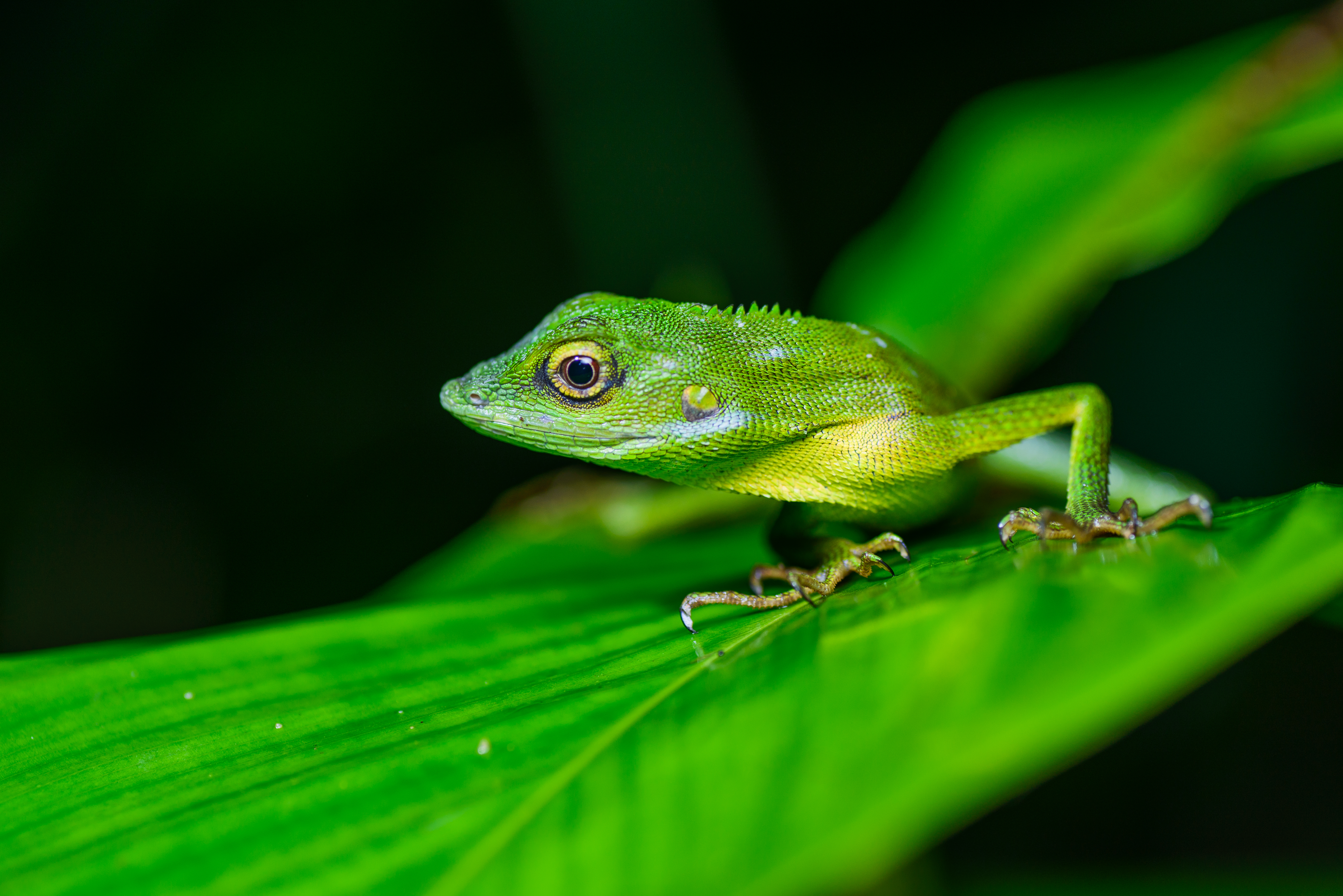

Conservation status
- Least Concern (IUCN 3.1)

Scientific classification
- Kingdom: Animalia
- Phylum: Chordata
- Class: Reptilia
- Order: Squamata
- Suborder: Iguania
- Family: Agamidae
- Genus: Bronchocela
- Species: B. rayaensis

Binomial name
- Bronchocela rayaensis Grismer, Wood, Lee, Quah, Anuar, Ngadi & Sites, 2015

= Bronchocela rayaensis =

Species of lizard

Bronchocela rayaensis, the Gunung Raya green-crested lizard, is a species of agamid lizard. It is endemic to Malay Peninsula and is known from Langkawi in Kedah, northwestern part of Peninsular Malaysia (its type locality), as well as from Phuket and Phang Nga Provinces in southern Thailand.
