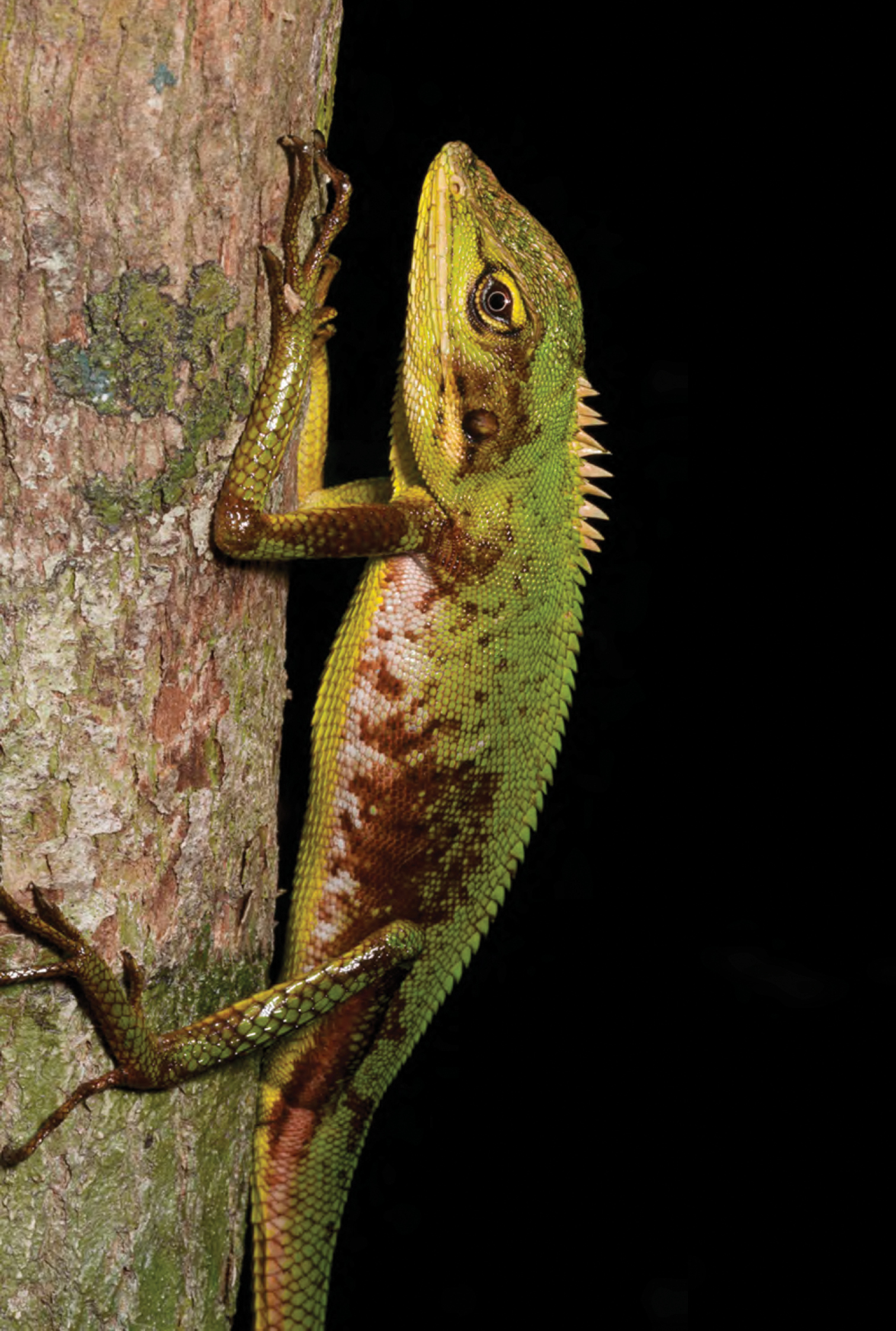

Conservation status
- Least Concern (IUCN 3.1)

Scientific classification
- Kingdom: Animalia
- Phylum: Chordata
- Class: Reptilia
- Order: Squamata
- Suborder: Iguania
- Family: Agamidae
- Genus: Bronchocela
- Species: B. marmorata

Binomial name
- Bronchocela marmorata JE Gray, 1845
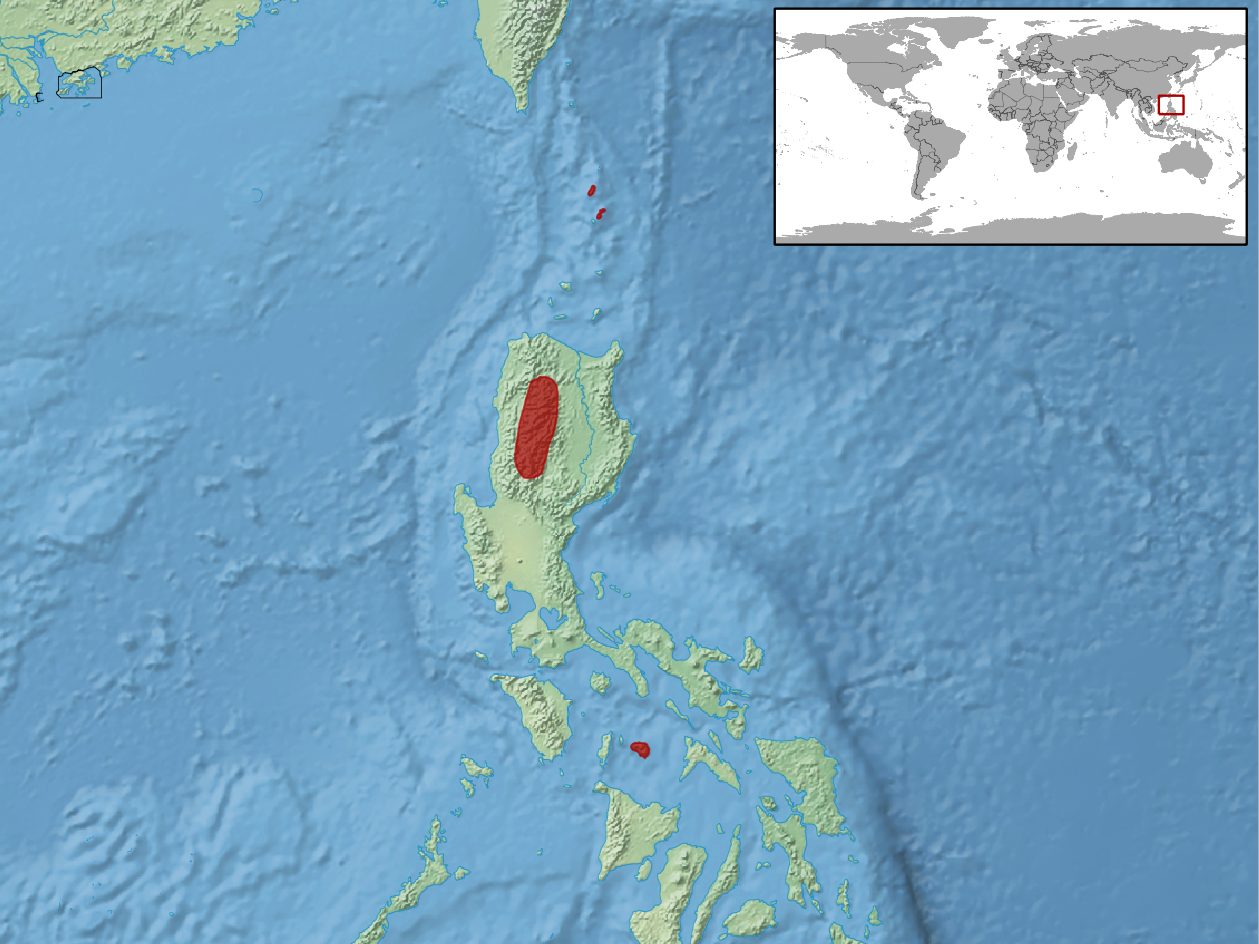

= Bronchocela marmorata =

Species of lizard

Bronchocela marmorata, marbled crested lizard, marbled bloodsucker or marbled agamid lizard is a species of lizard. It is endemic to the Philippines, where it inhabits lowland dipterocarp and montane forests at elevations 400 to 800 m above mean sea level. It is typically found on branches and leaves of trees. It feeds on insects and is oviparous, digging the soil to lay its eggs at the base of trees.
