= Bronchocela rubrigularis =

Scientific classification
- Kingdom: Animalia
- Phylum: Chordata
- Class: Reptilia
- Order: Squamata
- Suborder: Iguania
- Family: Agamidae
- Genus: Bronchocela
- Species: B. rubrigularis

Binomial name
- Bronchocela rubrigularis Hallermann, 2009

Species of lizard

Bronchocela rubrigularis is a species of lizard. It is endemic to the Nicobar Islands
