= Hermann Stenner =

German painter (1891–1914)

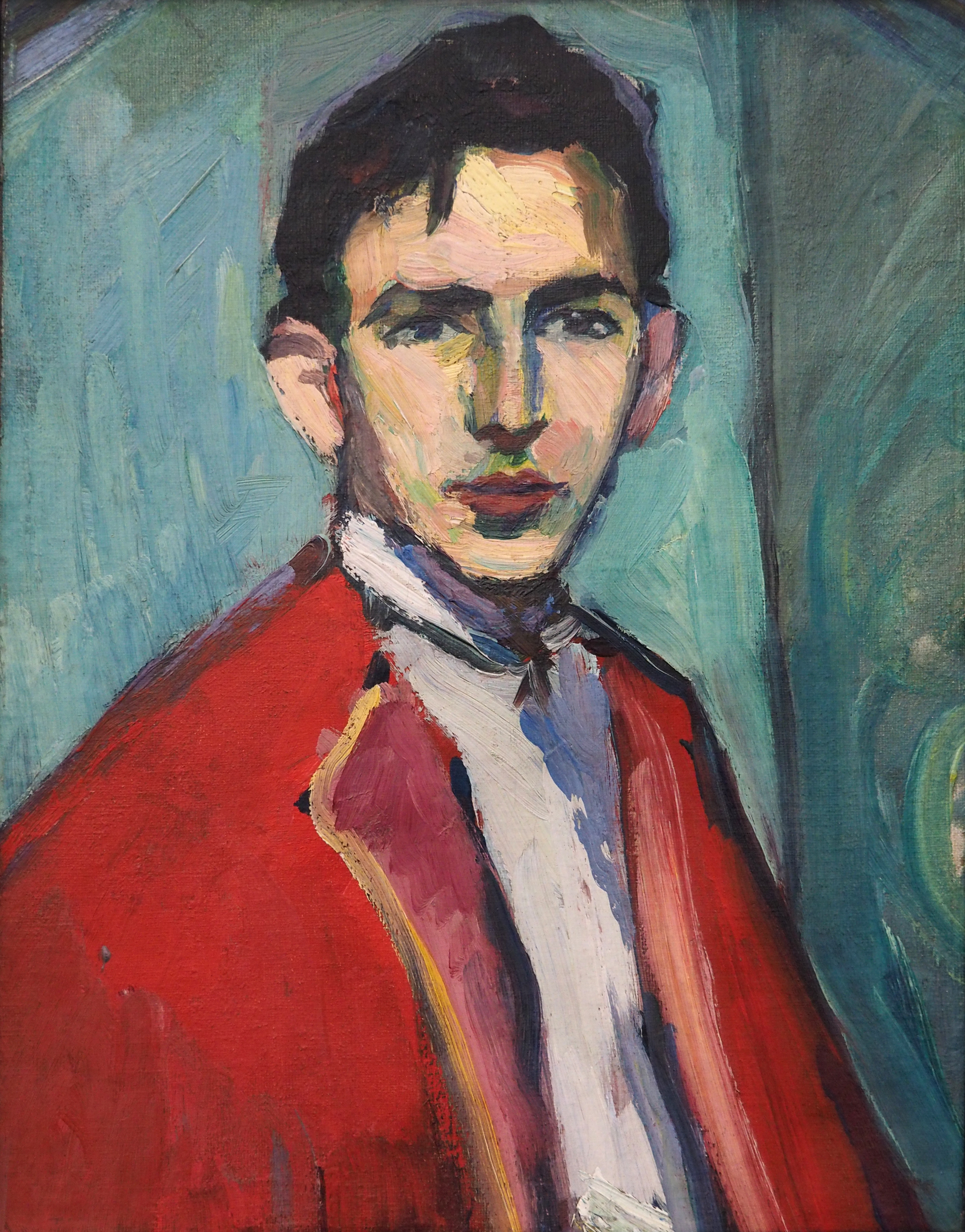
Self-portrait in Red Jacket (1911)

Hermann Stenner (12 March 1891, Bielefeld – 5 December 1914, near Iłów (German: Enlau)) was a German Expressionist painter and graphic artist.

== Biography ==
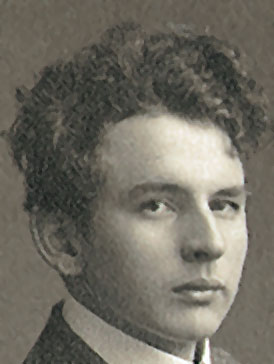
Stenner as a teenager

His father, Hugo, was a decorative painter. He attended the local Arts and Crafts school and honed his skills by making copies of old paintings. In 1909, he passed the entrance examination at the Academy of Fine Arts, Munich, and was assigned to the drawing class of Heinrich Knirr. That summer, he spent some time with Hans von Hayek at his art school in Dachau. Both Von Hayek and Knirr recommended that he leave Munich to study with Christian Landenberger in Stuttgart.

In 1910, he enrolled at the State Academy of Fine Arts Stuttgart. After a year of study with Landenberger, he took composition classes from Adolf Hölzel, whose teaching methods differed from anything he had experienced before; treating art as a type of science. In 1912, he became one of Hölzel's master pupils at his studio in the garden of Stuttgart Castle. Later that year, he spent four weeks with his friends in Paris.

In 1913, he was invited to exhibit at the first Expressionist art exhibition in Dresden. That same year, Hölzel was able to secure him a position painting murals in the main lobby of the upcoming Werkbund Exhibition, where he worked with Oskar Schlemmer and Willi Baumeister. The response to their work ranged from enthusiastic praise to categorical rejection.

Following the outbreak of World War I, Stenner and Schlemmer volunteered and were assigned to Grenadier Regiment #119 ("Königin Olga"). After serving for two months on the Western Front, the regiment was transferred to the Eastern Front in Poland, where he was killed during an attack on Iłów in Sochaczew County in the Masovian Voivodeship .

Despite his short working life, he was able to create 280 paintings and over 1,500 drawings. In March, 2016, on the 125th anniversary of his birth, the Villa Weber in Bielefeld officially became the Hermann-Stenner-Haus museum. The core of the collection was provided by Hermann-Josef Bunte, a legal scholar and art collector.

== Selected paintings ==
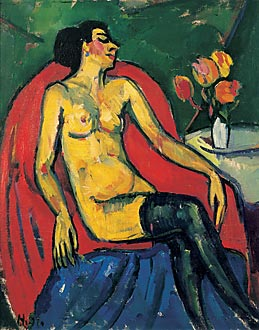
Sitting Nude

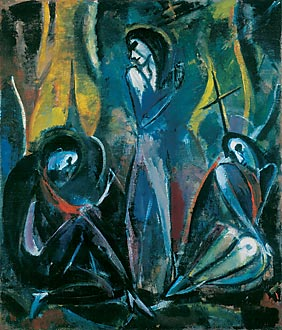
Resurrection

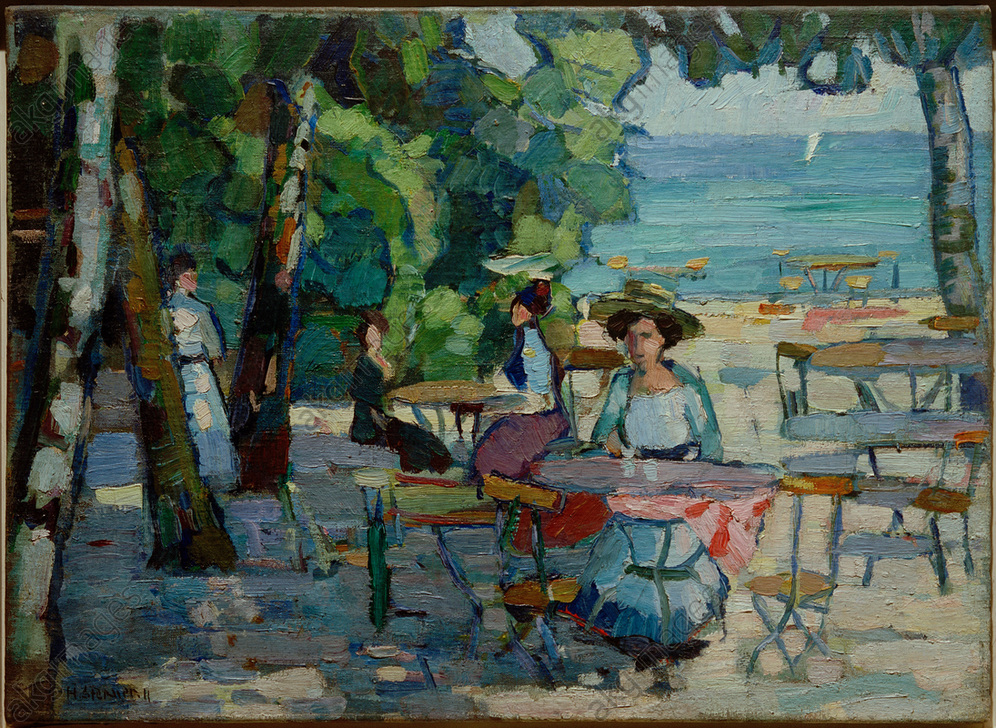
Café Garden at Ammersee

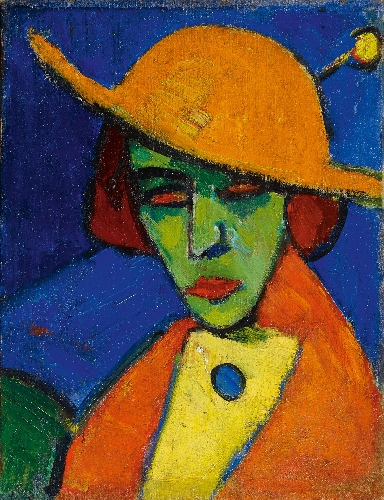
Green Woman with Yellow Hat
