= Hans von Hayek =

German painter

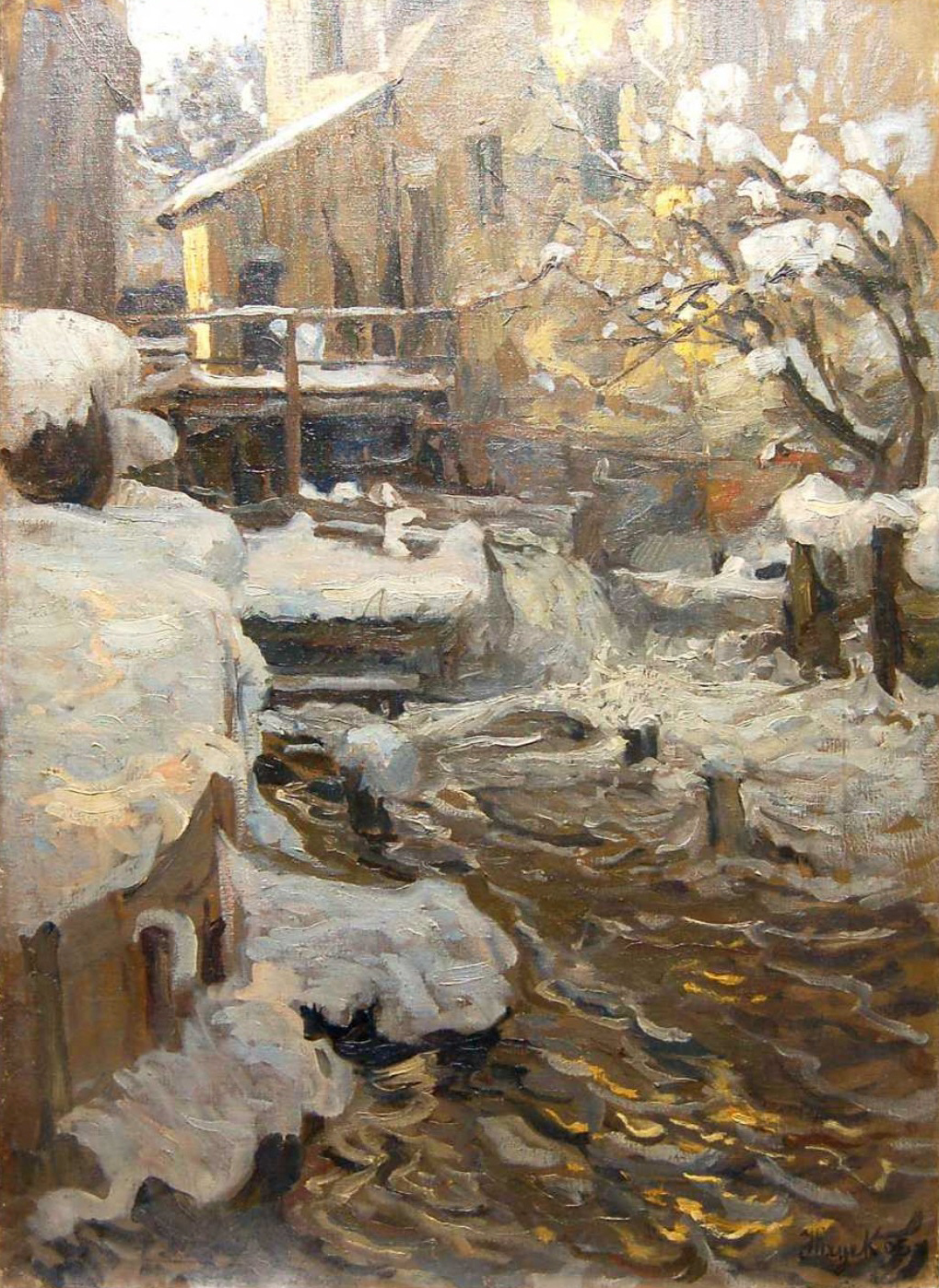
Snowbound Weir at Dachau

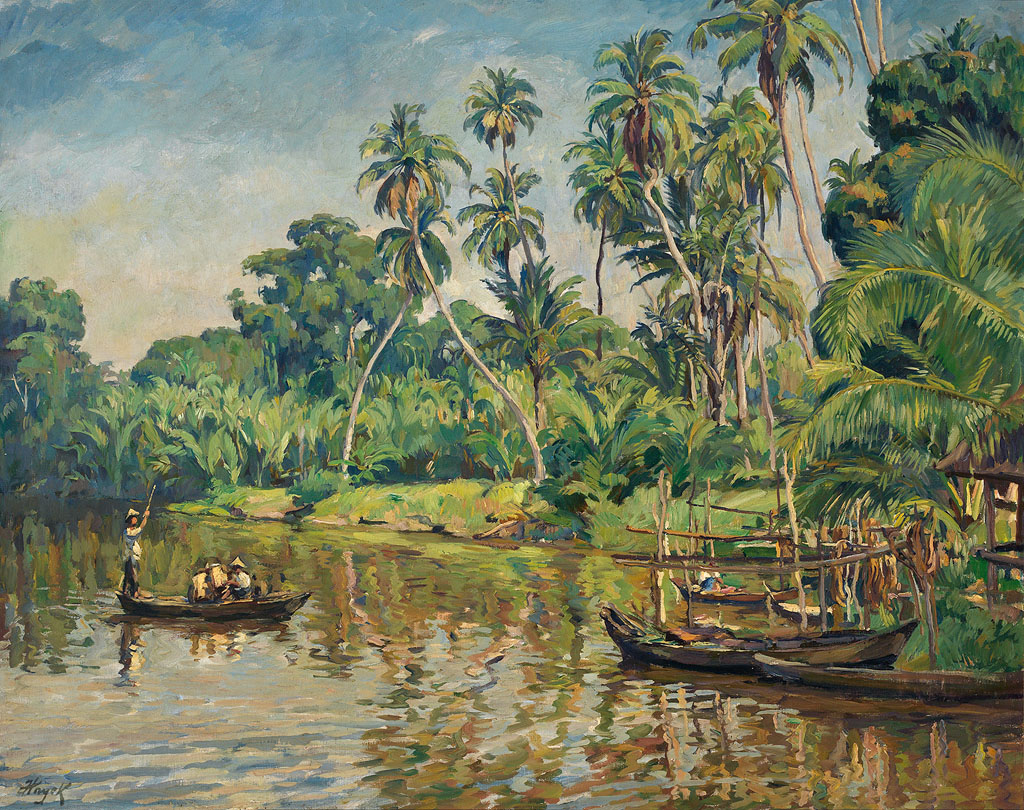
River Landscape in Sumatra

Hans von Hayek (19 December 1869 – 17 January 1940) was an Austrian-born German Impressionist painter.

== Early life and education ==
Hans von Hayek was born on 19 December 1869 in Vienna to Theodor von Hayek and Marie Cäcilie Wittek. His paternal uncle was the naturalist Gustav von Hayek, and his first cousin was Gustav's son, August von Hayek, who was the father of economist Friedrich Hayek.

In 1891, after a short period of study at the University of Applied Arts in Vienna, he moved to Munich and enrolled at the Academy of Fine Arts, where he studied with Gabriel von Hackl, Wilhelm von Lindenschmit and Carl von Marr. Later, he met the animal painter, Heinrich von Zügel, who ultimately had the most influence on his style.

== Career ==
After leaving Munich, he stayed in Olching for a time then, in 1900, settled at the artists' colony in Dachau. There, he started a private school devoted to plein aire painting, which he operated until 1915. Many notable painters studied there, including Hugo Hatzler, Hermann Stenner, Anna Klein and Norbertine Bresslern-Roth. One of his students, Carl Thiemann, wrote in his memoirs that the local farmers frequently complained about them trampling the grass and leaving oil paints behind.

The financial success of his school enabled him to make frequent study trips throughout Western and Northern Europe. As a member of the board of the Munich Secession, he helped organize their 1904 exhibition at the Staatliche Antikensammlungen. He also exhibited with the Deutscher Künstlerbund and, in 1908, became a German citizen.

During World War I, he worked as a battle painter. Following the war, he took extended trips to Indonesia and Ceylon. Many of his works were lost in the fire that destroyed the Munich Glaspalast in 1931. Others were lost a few years after his death when his studio was hit during a bombing in 1945. Numerous works survive, however, notably those at the Gemäldegalerie Dachau, which he helped create.

Hayek died on 17 January 1940 in Munich.

== Honors and awards ==
Hayek is commemorated in the scientific name of a species of Sumatran lizard, Bronchocela hayeki.
