= Norbertine Bresslern-Roth =

Austrian painter and printmaker

Norbertine von Bresslern-Roth (born 13 November 1891 in Graz, died 30 November 1978 in Graz) was an Austrian painter and printmaker.

== Life ==
Norbertine Roth grew up in Graz, in the Klosterwiesgasse. Her mother Aloisia Roth was the daughter of a riding school owner from Vienna-Leopoldstadt. Norbertine's artistic talent was recognized in elementary school by her teacher, who advocated that from 1907 on she was allowed to participate free of charge in drawing and painting lessons at the Styrian Landeskunstschule under its director Alfred Schrötter von Kristelli. During the summer months of 1909 and 1910 she attended the animal painting school in Dachau near Munich under Hans von Hayek. In 1911 Norbertine Roth left Graz to study under Professor Ferdinand Schmutzer at the Academy of Fine Arts Vienna. Schmutzer was also so impressed by the young artist's talent that he accepted her into his studio at the Academy after only one year, although women were first officially allowed to study at the Vienna Art Academy in 1921. As early as 1912 she received the silver medal of the city of Graz as the first honour from her home town. After a successful exhibition at the Wiener Secession in 1916, she returned to Graz to establish herself as a freelance artist. With the first "Norbertine Roth Special Exhibition" (1918), coinciding with the end of World War I, she enjoyed great success in her home town, Graz. Already in the 1920s, she was one of the first women to become intensively involved with the new printing process of linocut. From 1921 to 1952 she created numerous animal depictions in this technique. In 1928 Bresslern-Roth undertook a journey to North Africa, which led her to create numerous animal paintings, some of which have the character of studies. Later she let herself be inspired in European zoos. Additionally, she illustrated children's books, gobelins and miniatures on ivory. In 1932 Norbertine von Bresslern-Roth was awarded the title "Professor". In 1951 she became honorary president of the Styrian Art Association, which was reauthorized in 1946.

During the Anschluss she created some pictures that today are considered critical of the regime. For this reason, and because she did not divorce her husband, Georg Ritter von Bresslern (1892-1952), whom she married in 1918 and who was classified under Nazi legislation as a "Half-Jew", she is today classified as part of the "cultural resistance".

== Work ==
Norbertine von Bresslern-Roth is regarded worldwide as the most important animal painter of the present day. In particular, her later works, which are less of a study and more of an artistic nature, are considered unrivalled. With her linocuts, she created outstanding and progressive graphic works of art, with which she was able to position herself in the international art scene already during her lifetime. With her representations she also achieved a great broad effect. In 1952 an exhibition of her works in Graz was visited by the then unimaginable number of 10,000 people.

Works by Bresslern-Roth in the collection of Universalmuseum Joanneum and the National Gallery of Victoria and Metropolitan Museum of Art.

== Works ==
- Paintings:
  - Sterbender, von Pfeilen durchbohrter Löwe (ca. 1928)
  - Schneeleopard (1939)
  - Verfolgung (1941)
- Prints:
  - Windhunde (1925)
  - Blaukehlchen (1922)
  - Leopardenjagd (Leopard Hunt) (1927)
- Children's books:
  - Im Zoo (1944)
  - ABC (Graz, Kienreich, 1946)
  - Die Wiese (1948)
  - Professor Wüsstegern (Kinderbuchreihe)

== Awards ==
- 1912: Silber-Medaille der Stadt Graz
- 1921: Österreichischer Staatspreis
- 1922: Gold-Medaille der Stadt Graz
- 1934: Ehrenpreis der Stadt Wien
- 1936: Österreichischer Staatspreis
- 1971: Würdigungspreis des Landes Steiermark für bildende Kunst
- 1972: Ehrenring der Landeshauptstadt Graz

== Exhibitions ==
- 1931 Modern Austrian Woodcuts and Colour prints, Brooklyn Museum.

From 26 October 2016 to 17 April 2017 Universalmuseum Joanneum exhibited a comprehensive retrospective of the artist's work in the Neue Galerie Graz.

== Bibliography ==
- Michael Stoff (Hrsg.): Bresslern-Roth. Eine Hommage im St. Veiter Schlössl zu Graz, Graz 2003, Eigenverlag, ISBN 3-9501787-0-8.
- Kovacek & Zetter: Herbstausstellung, Österreichische Kunst des 20. Jahrhunderts (Wien 2003), Verkaufskatalog, Sonderausstellung Bresslern-Roth Norbertine, S. 53–83.
- Christa Steinle (Hrsg.): Norbertine Bresslern-Roth – Tiermalerin, Neue Galerie Graz, Universalmuseum Joanneum, Ausstellungskatalog, Graz: Leykam Buchverlag, 2016, ISBN 978-3-7011-8015-8.
- Bresslern, Norbertine Roth von, 1891- (1981). Norbertine Bresslern-Roth : 18 Faksimile-Blätter. Koschatzky, Walter., Graphische Sammlung Albertina. Graz, Austria: Akademische Druck- u. Verlagsanstalt. ISBN 3-201-01183-5. OCLC 10889793.
