= Bronchocela hayeki =

Conservation status
- Least Concern (IUCN 3.1)

Scientific classification
- Kingdom: Animalia
- Phylum: Chordata
- Class: Reptilia
- Order: Squamata
- Suborder: Iguania
- Family: Agamidae
- Genus: Bronchocela
- Species: B. hayeki

Binomial name
- Bronchocela hayeki (L. Müller, 1928)

Synonyms
- Calotes hayeki L. Müller, 1928

Species of lizard

Bronchocela hayeki, also known commonly as the Sumatra bloodsucker, is a species of lizard in the family Agamidae. The species is endemic to Indonesia.

== Etymology ==
B. hayeki is named after the Austrian-German painter Hans von Hayek, who spent many years in Indonesia and Ceylon during World War I.

== Geographic range ==
B. hayeki is found in northern Sumatra, Indonesia.

== Habitat ==
The preferred natural habitat of B. hayeki is forest, at altitudes of 300–1,400 m (980–4,590 ft), but it has also been found in disturbed areas such as plantations, gardens, and villages with shrubs and trees.

== Description ==
B. hayeki is bright green dorsally, and lighter green ventrally. The lips, the area around the eye, and the typanum (ear drum) are brownish black. Males may attain a snout-to-vent length (SVL) of 12 cm (4.7 in). Females are smaller, with a maximum recorded SVL of 9.4 cm (3.7 in). The tail is very long, as much as 41 cm (16 in).

== Behavior ==
B. hayeki is arboreal and diurnal.

== Reproduction ==
B. hayeki is oviparous.
