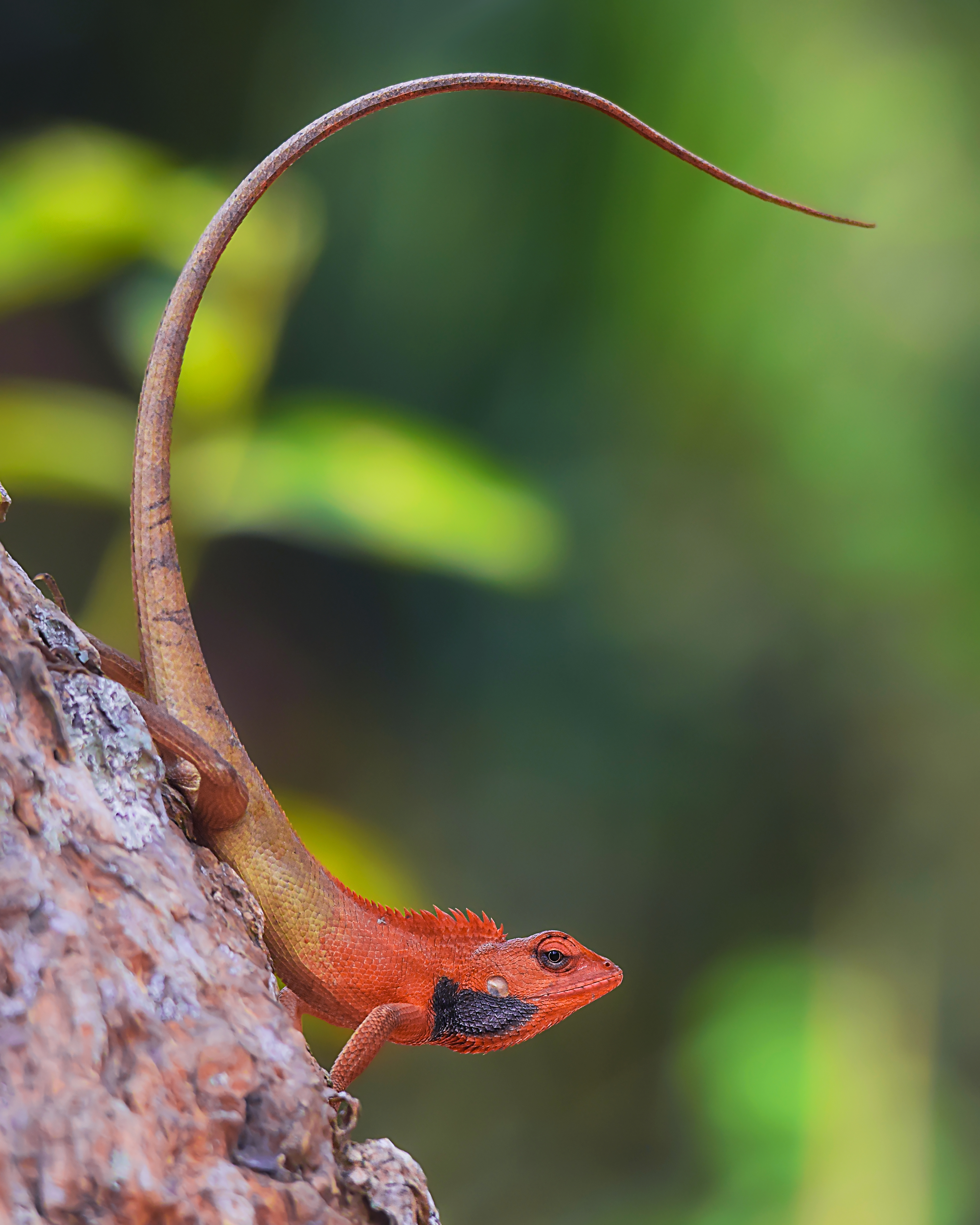
- Male, Bangladesh
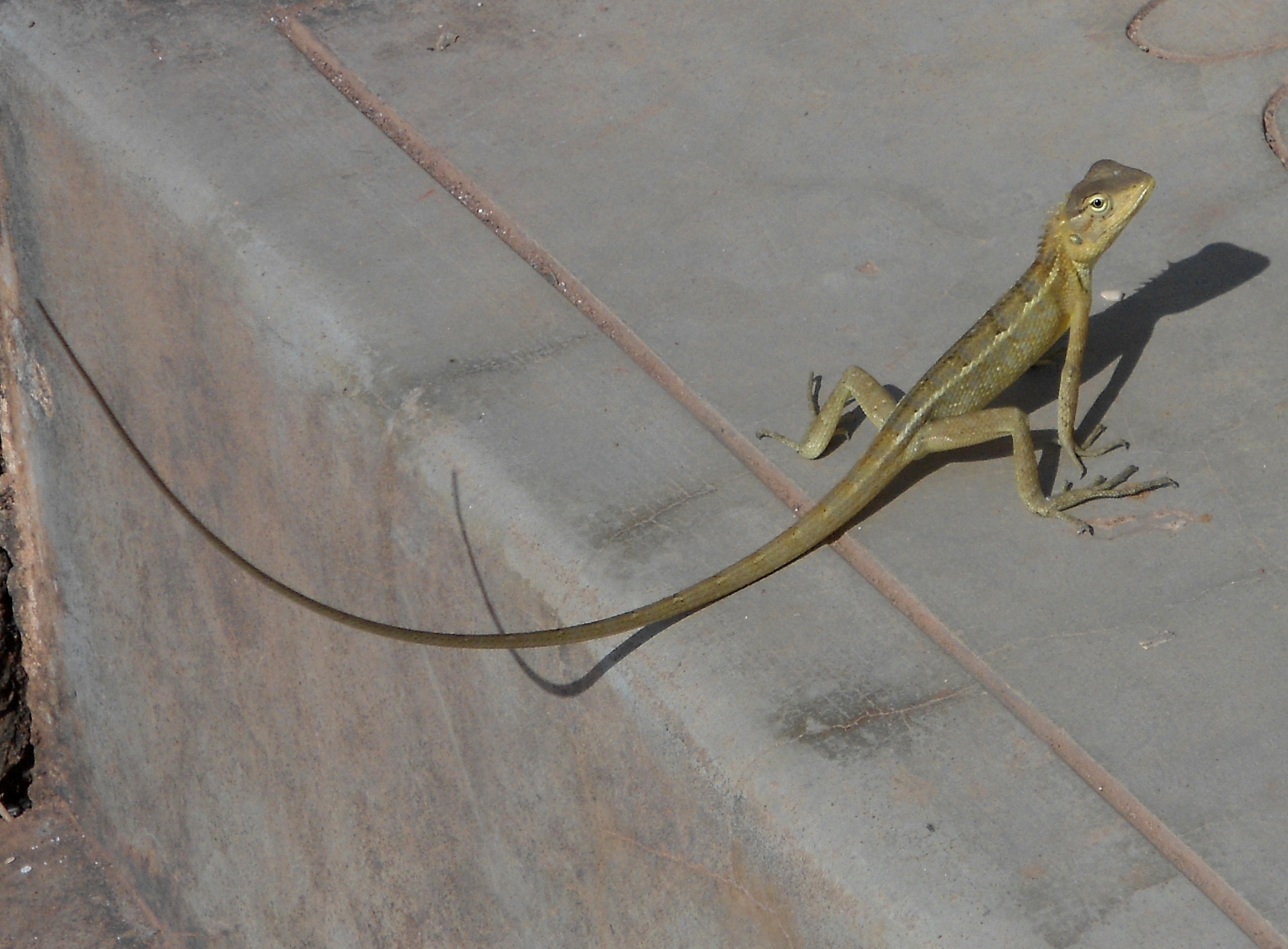
- Female

Conservation status
- Least Concern (IUCN 3.1)

Scientific classification
- Kingdom: Animalia
- Phylum: Chordata
- Class: Reptilia
- Order: Squamata
- Suborder: Iguania
- Family: Agamidae
- Genus: Calotes
- Species: C. versicolor

Binomial name
- Calotes versicolor (Daudin, 1802)

= Oriental garden lizard =

Species of lizard

The oriental garden lizard (Calotes versicolor), also called the eastern garden lizard, Indian garden lizard, common garden lizard, bloodsucker or changeable lizard, is an agamid lizard found widely distributed in Indo-Malaya. It has also been introduced in many other parts of the world.

== Description ==
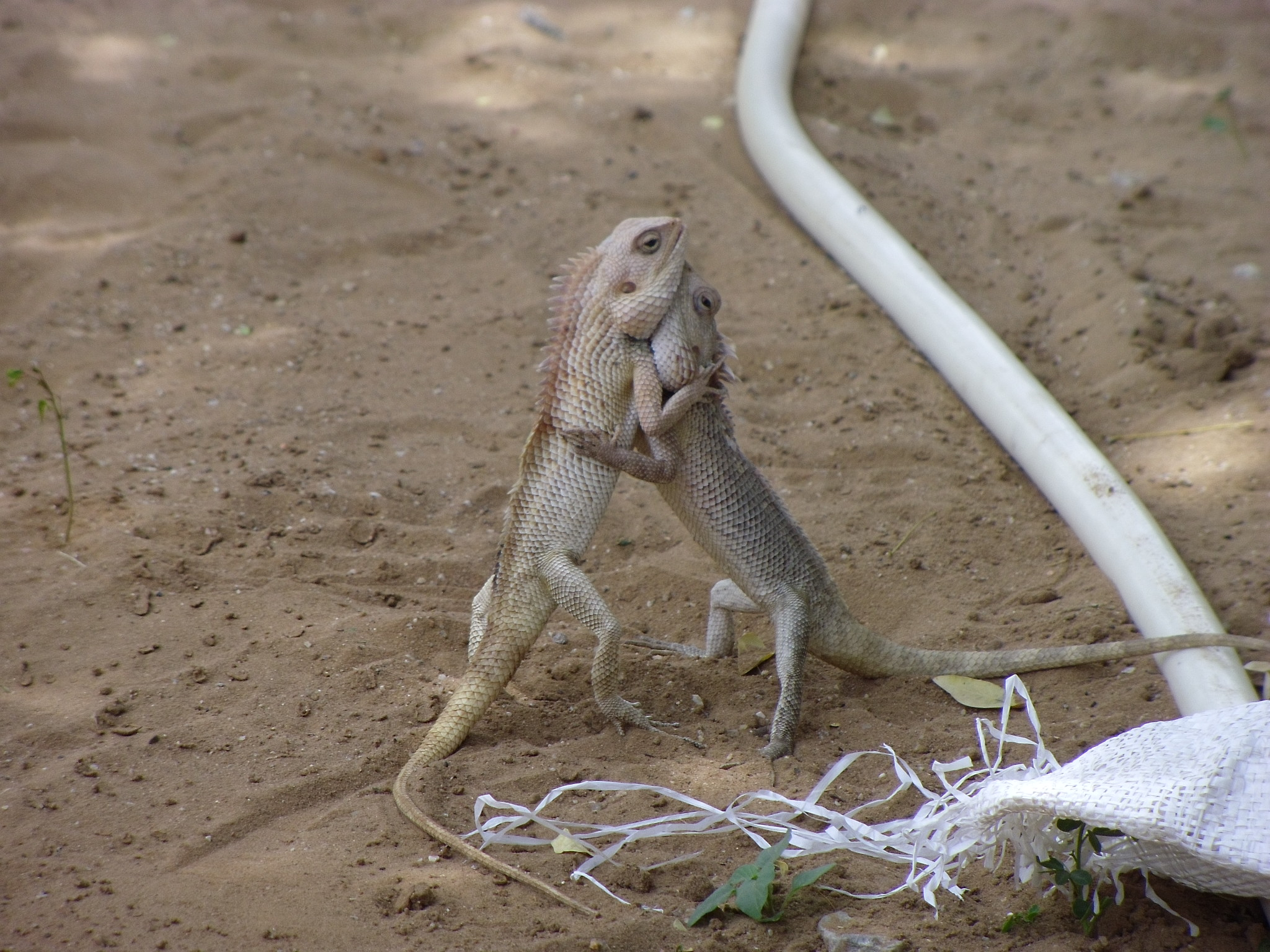
Fighting, in India

Calotes versicolor is an insectivore, and the male gets a bright red throat in the breeding season. It measures over 10 cm (3.9 in) in length snout-to-vent. Total length including the tail is up to 37 cm (14.5 in). Two small groups of spines, perfectly separated from each other, above each tympanum. Dorsal crest moderately elevated on the neck and anterior part of the trunk, extending on to the root of the tail in large individuals, and gradually disappearing on the middle of the trunk in younger ones. No fold in front of the shoulder, but the scales behind the lower jaw are much smaller than the others; gular sac not developed. From thirty-nine to forty-three series of scales round the middle of the trunk. The hind foot (measured from the heel to the extremity of the fourth toe) is not much longer than the head in the adult, whilst it is considerably longer in the young. The coloration is very variable, sometimes uniform brownish or greyish-olive or yellowish. Generally broad brown bands across the back, interrupted by a yellowish lateral band. Black streaks radiate from the eye, and some of them are continued over the throat, running obliquely backwards, belly frequently with greyish longitudinal stripes, one along the median line being the most distinct; young and half-grown specimens have a dark, black-edged band across the inter-orbital region.

The ground-colour is generally a light brownish olive, but the lizard can change it to bright red, to black, and to a mixture of both. This change is sometimes confined to the head, at other times diffused over the whole body and tail. A common state in which it may be seen (as stated by T. C. Jerdon) is, seated on a hedge or bush, with the tail and limbs black, head and neck yellow picked out with red, and the rest of the body red. Jerdon and Blyth agree that these bright, changeable colours are peculiar to the male during the breeding-season, which falls in the months of May to early October.

Albert Guenther mentioned that Alexandre Henri Mouhot had collected in Siam one of those fine variations of colours, which, however, appear to be infinite. It has the usual cross streaks between the eyes and the radiating lines continent of India to China; it is very common in Sri Lanka, not extending into the temperate zone of the Himalayas. Sri Lankan specimens are generally somewhat larger; one of them measured 16 inches, the tail taking 11 inches. It is found in hedges and trees; it is known in Sri Lanka under the name of "Bloodsucker", a designation the origin of which cannot be satisfactorily traced; in the opinion of Kelaart, the name was given to it from the occasional reddish hue of the throat and neck. "Roktochosha (রক্তচোষা)" is also a local name in the Bengali language, which also translates to "bloodsucker".

The female lays from five to sixteen soft oval eggs, about 5/8 of an inch long, in hollows of trees, or in holes in the soil which they have burrowed, afterward covering them up. The young appear in about eight or nine weeks. In a hot sunny day a solitary bloodsucker may be seen on a twig or on a wall, basking in the sun, with mouth wide open. After a shower of rain numbers of them are seen to come down on the ground and pick up the larva and small insects which fall from the trees during the showers. Changeable lizards escape danger by darting to the nearest tree. If the predator comes even closer, they will scale to the side of the tree facing away from the predator and very swiftly dart up the tree. The predator looks behind the tree only to see that the lizard is up in the branches.

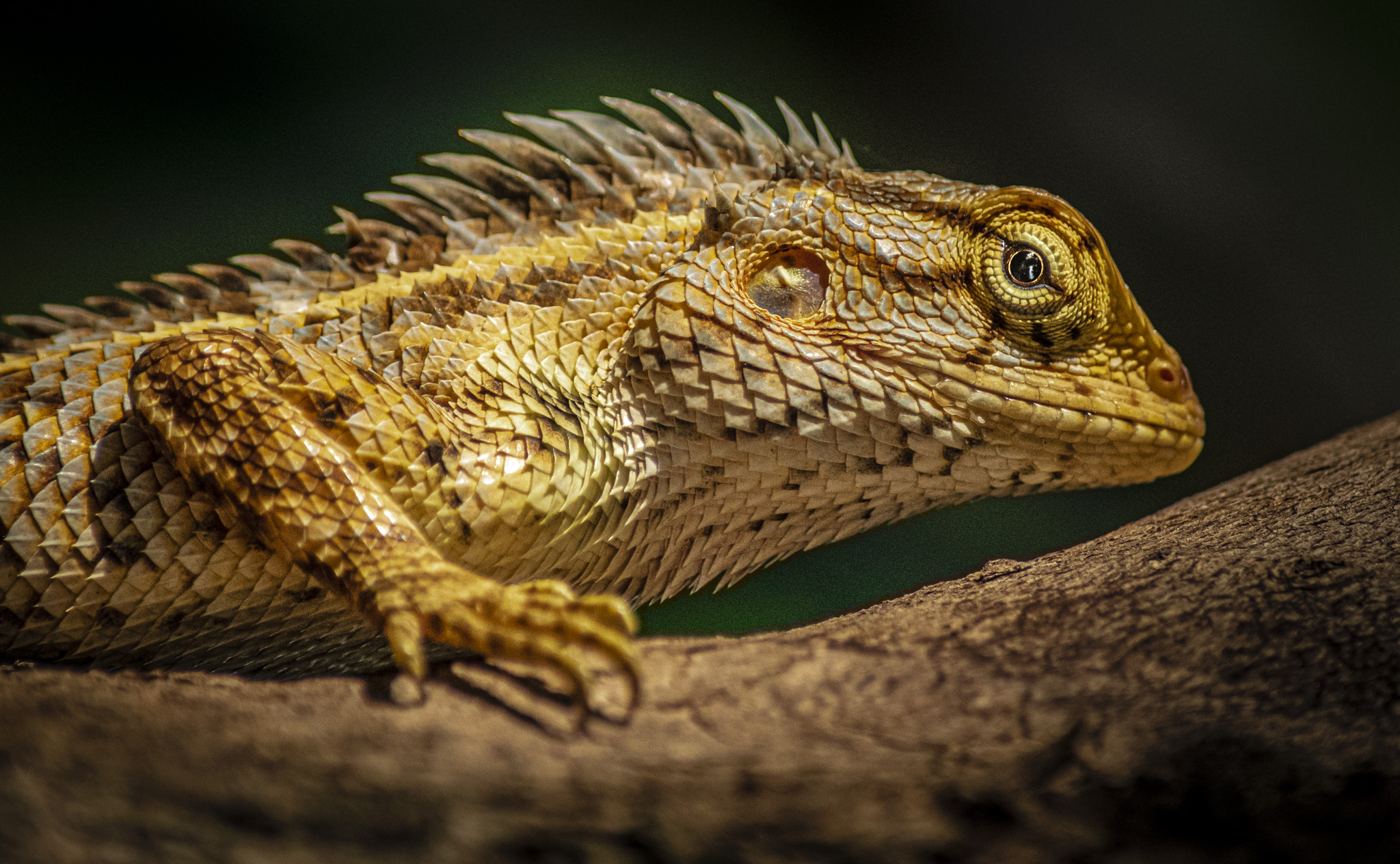
Yellow morph

During the breeding season, the male's head and shoulders turns bright orange to crimson and his throat black. Males also turn red-headed after a successful battle with rivals. Both males and females have a crest from the head to nearly the tail, hence their other common name, "crested tree lizard".

Unlike some other lizards, they do not drop their tails (autotomy), and their tails can be very long, stiff and pointy. Like other reptiles, they shed their skins. Like chameleons, changeable lizards can move each of their eyes in different directions.

== Distribution ==
The native range of the species includes southeastern Iran, Afghanistan, Bangladesh, Bhutan, Cambodia, India (including the Andaman Islands), Indonesia (Sumatra), Malaysia (western), Maldives, Mauritius (Reunion, Rodrigues), Myanmar, Nepal, Pakistan, Philippines, Sri Lanka (Ceylon), Thailand, Vietnam (including Pulo Condore Island). It has been introduced to Brunei, Celebes, Oman, Seychelles, Singapore and United States. The lizards were introduced to Singapore from Malaysia and Thailand in the 1980s. In Singapore, they are a threat to the native green-crested lizard. The changeable lizard is relatively common and found in a wide range of habitats. They appear to adapt well to humans and are thus not endangered. They are commonly found among undergrowth, in open habitats as well as highly urban areas. However, in China people regularly kill them, as they are viewed as pests.

== Diet ==
Changeable lizards eat mainly insects such as ants, beetles, dragonflies, and grasshoppers; as well as small vertebrates, including rodents and other lizards including agamids, geckos, and lizards. They have teeth which are designed for gripping prey and not tearing, and thus they usually shake prey to stun it then swallow it whole. Sometimes, young, inexperienced changeable lizards may choke on prey that is too large. Changeable lizards also occasionally consume plant matter.

== Reproduction ==
Males become highly territorial during breeding season. They discourage intruding males by brightening their red heads and doing "push-ups". Each tries to attract a female by inflating his throat and drawing attention to his handsomely colored head. Oviparous; about 10—20 eggs are laid, buried in moist soil. The eggs are long, spindle-shaped and covered with a leathery skin. They hatch in about 6–7 weeks. They are able to breed at about 1 year old.

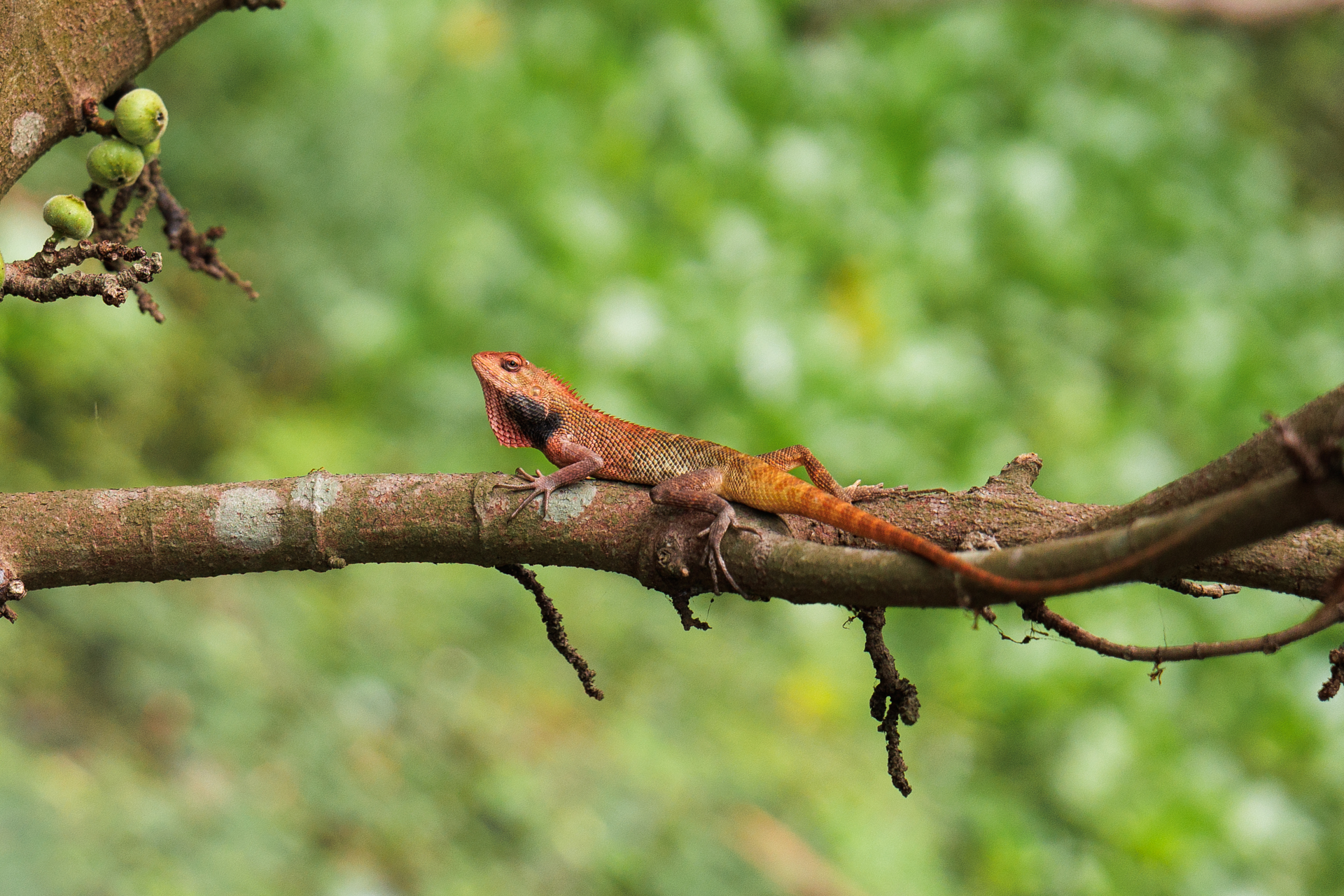

== Gallery ==
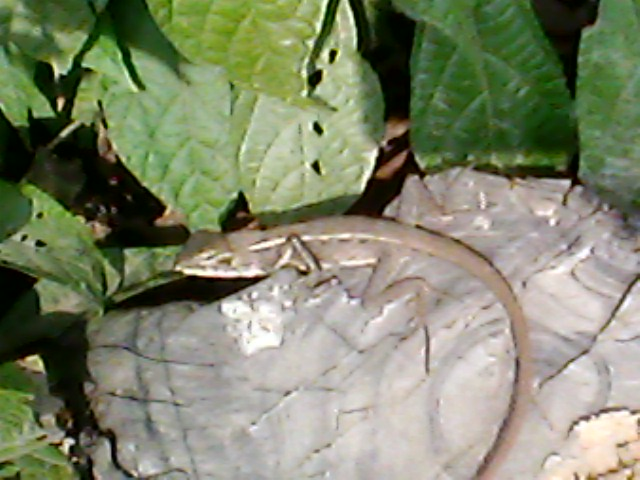
A Garden Lizard in Gazipur District, Bangladesh.

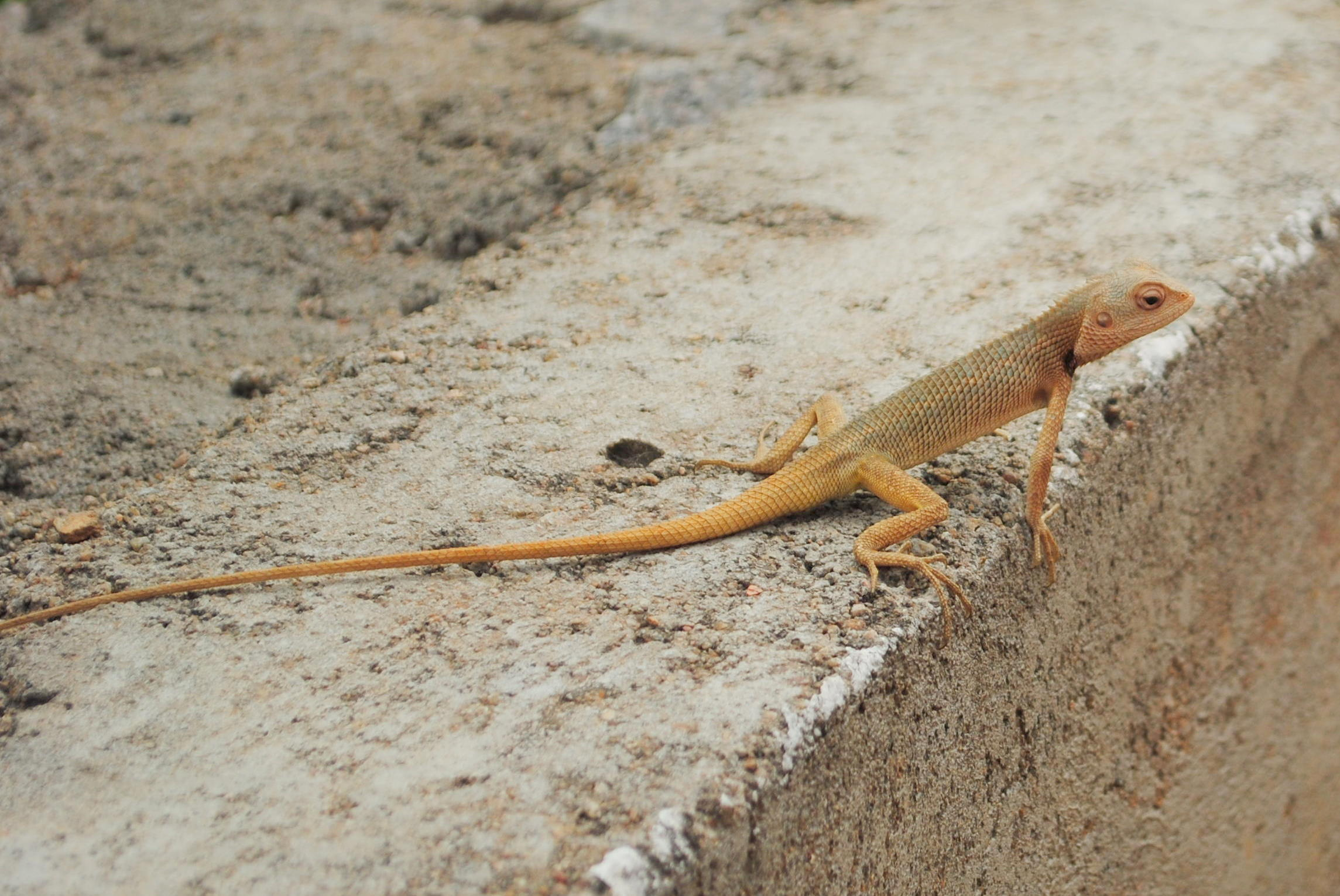
Juvenile male in Andhra Pradesh, India

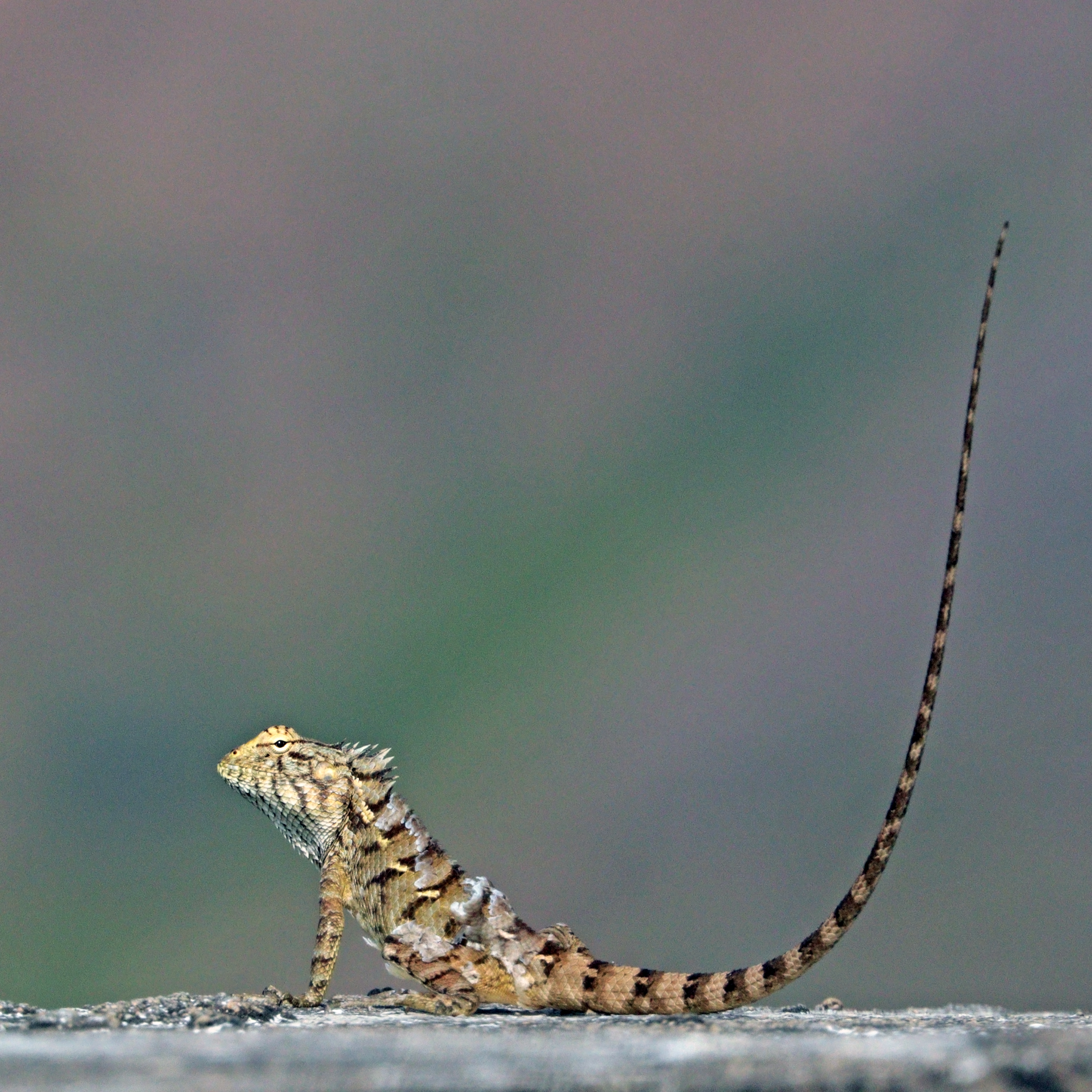
Tail display by juvenile male in Rajasthan, India

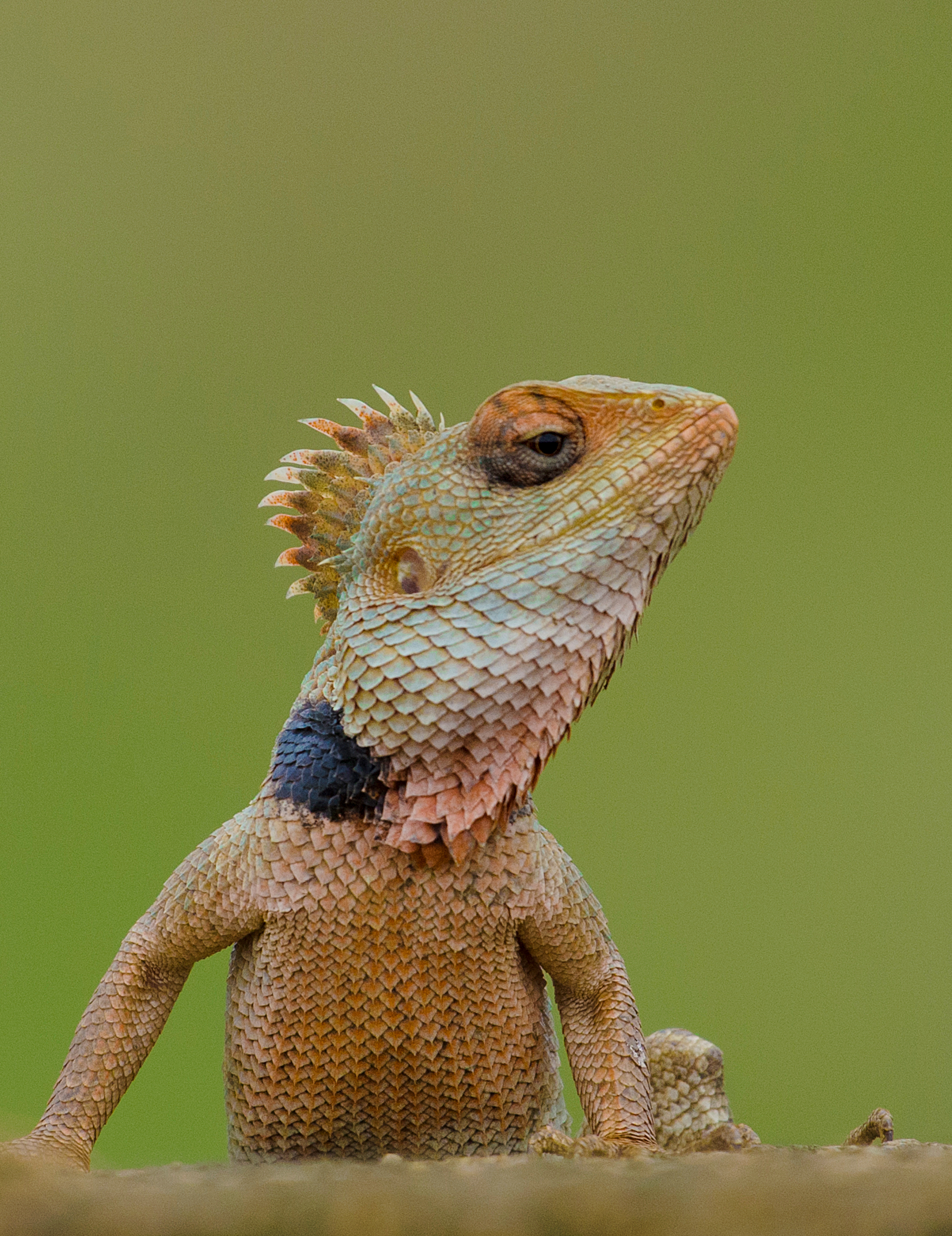
Male head in Bangalore, India

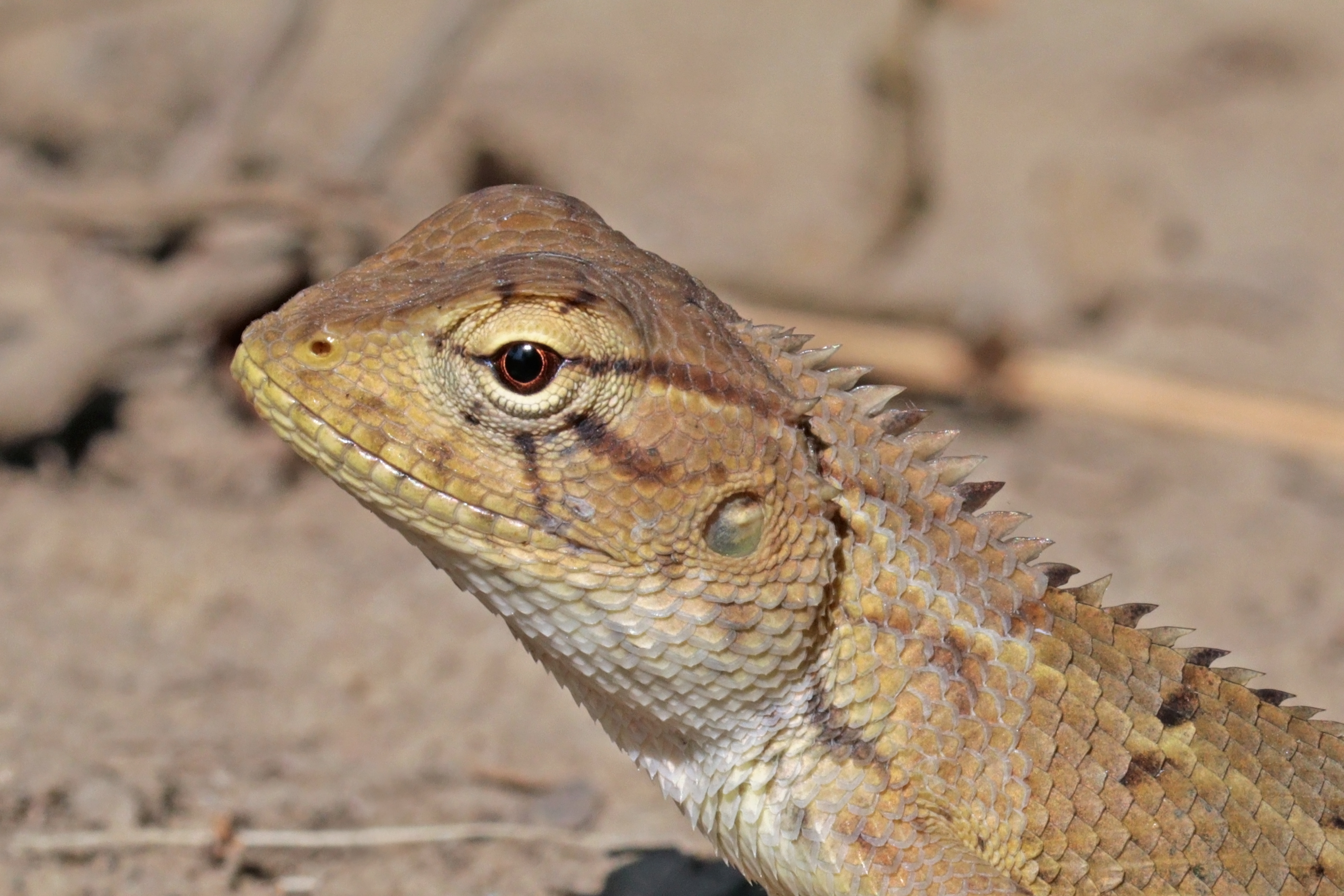
Female head in Bardia, Nepal

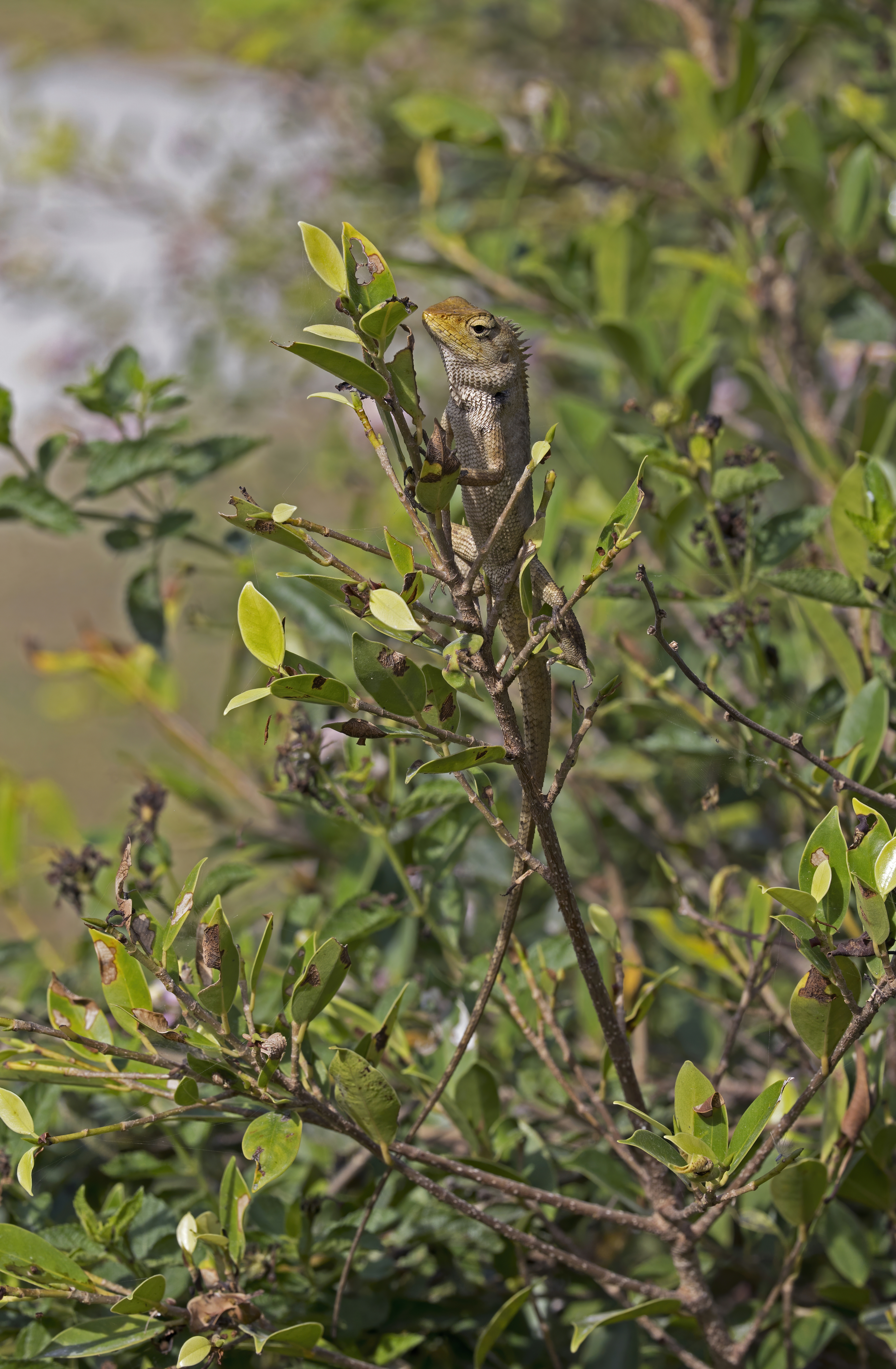
Waiting for prey in Ko Phi Phi, Thailand

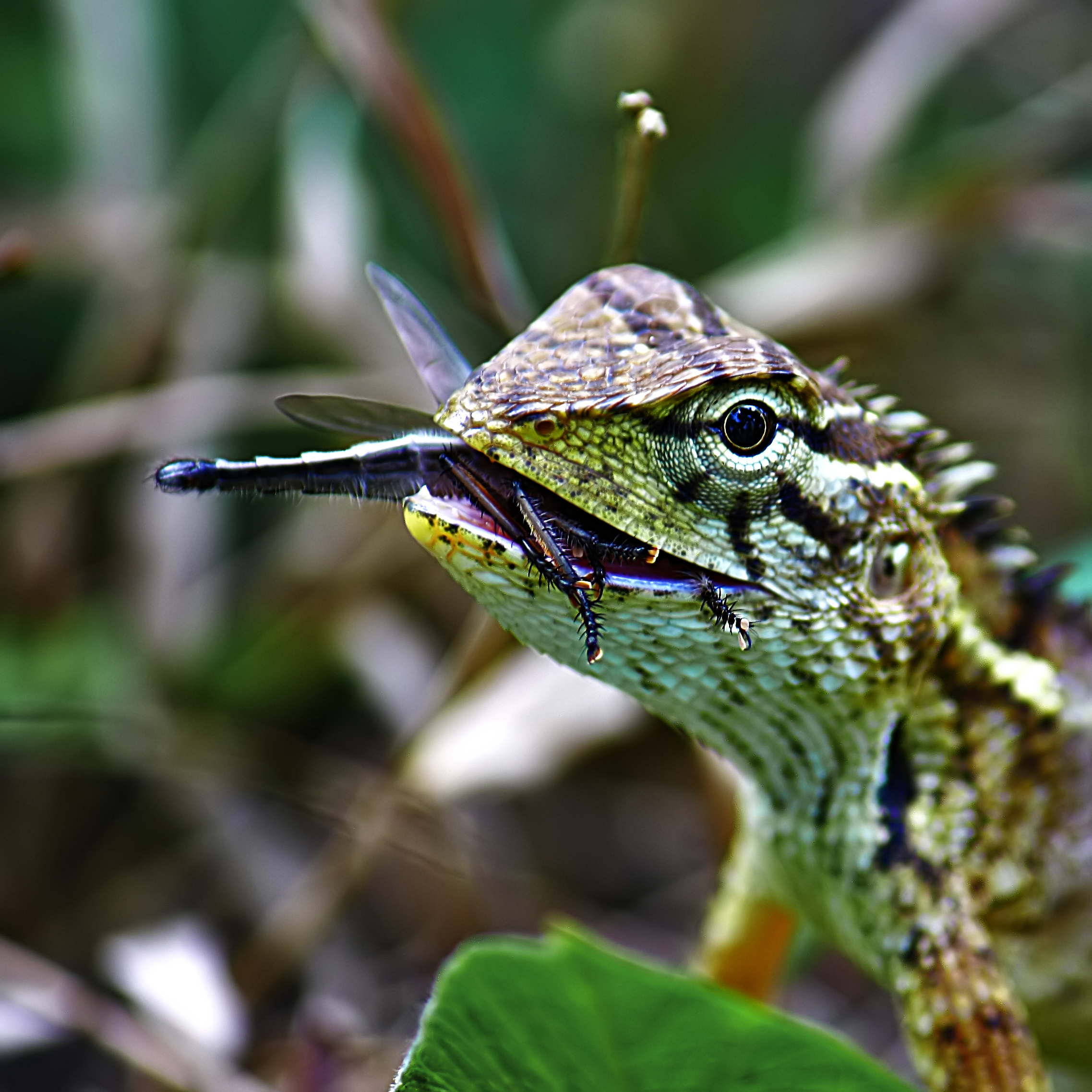
Eating a robber fly in Gal Oya, Sri Lanka

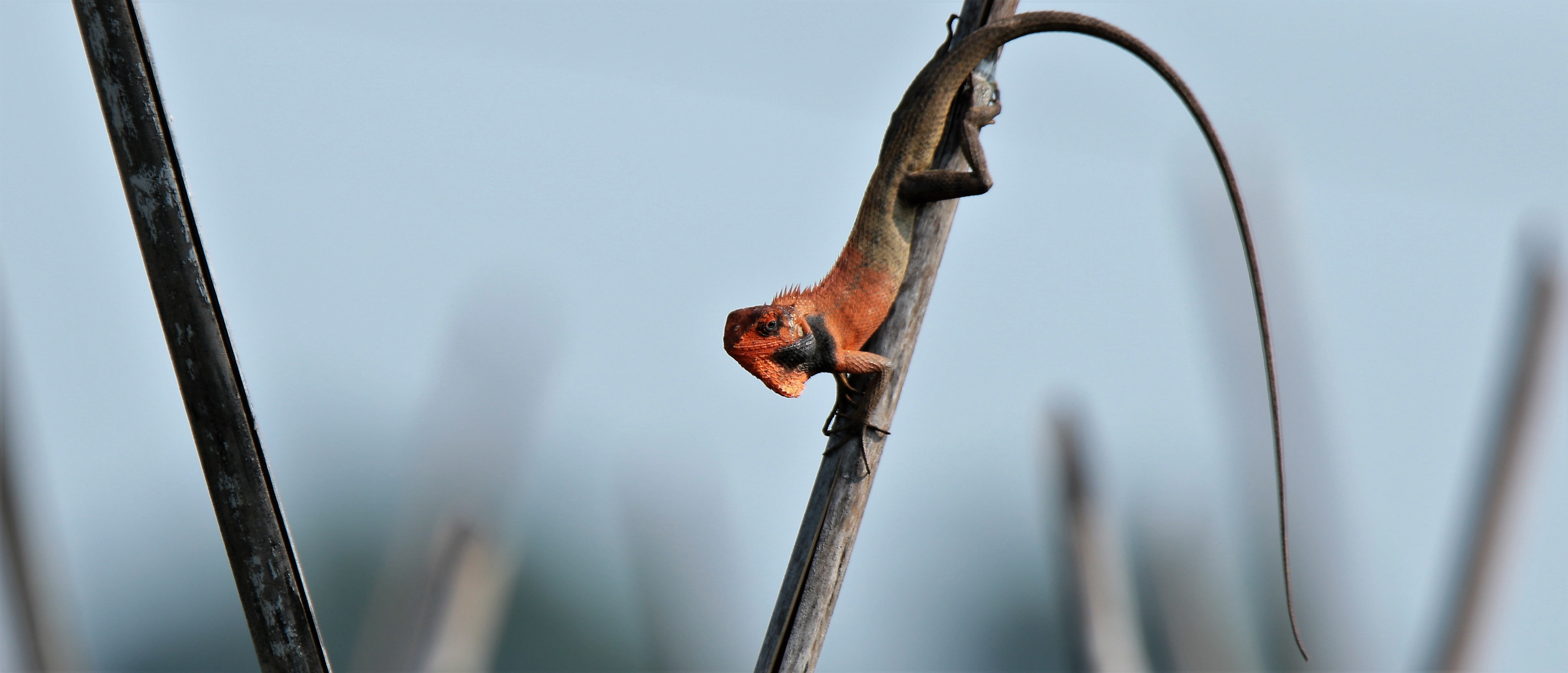
Vietnam

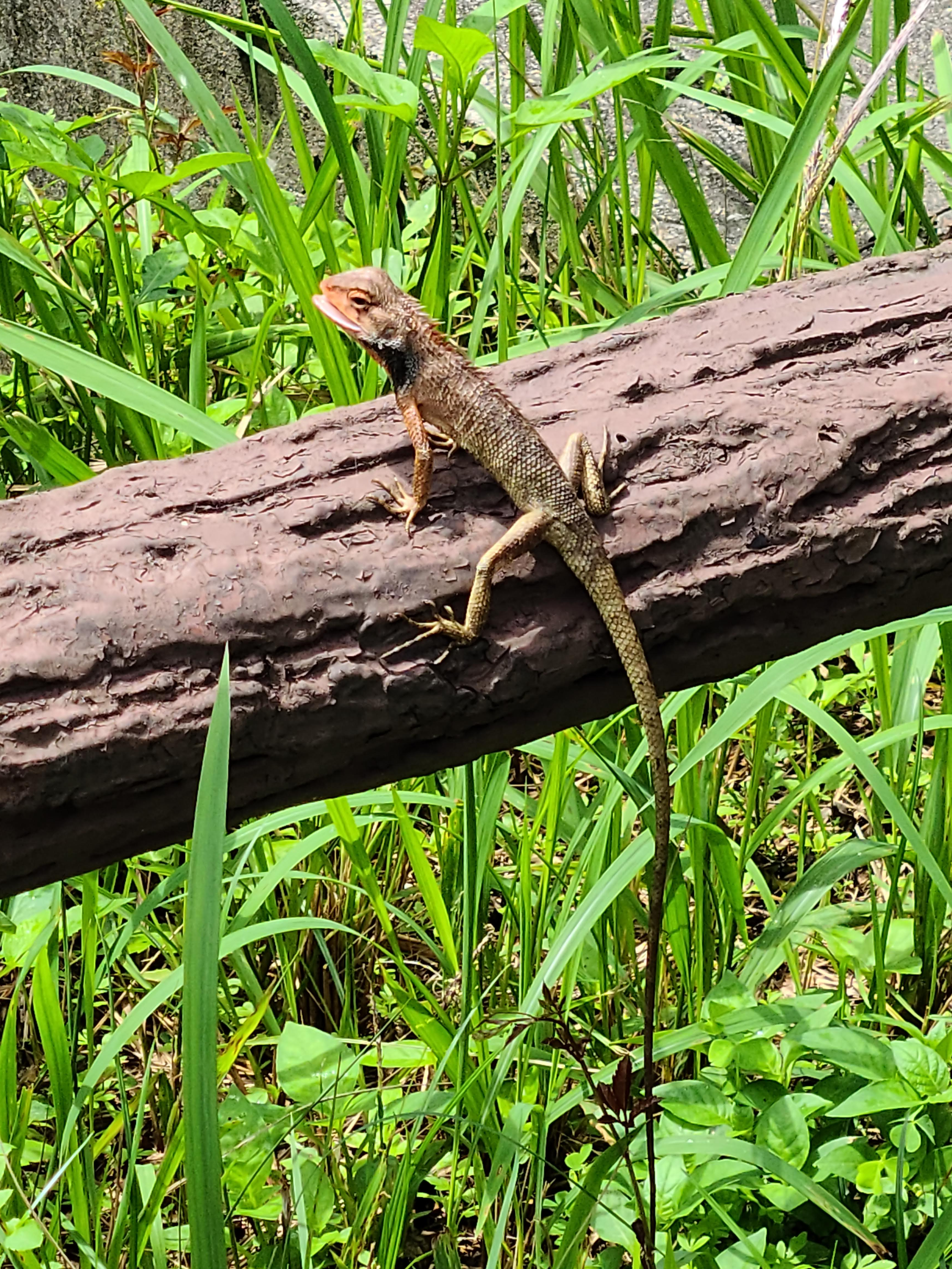
Male as seen in Hok Tau, Hong Kong

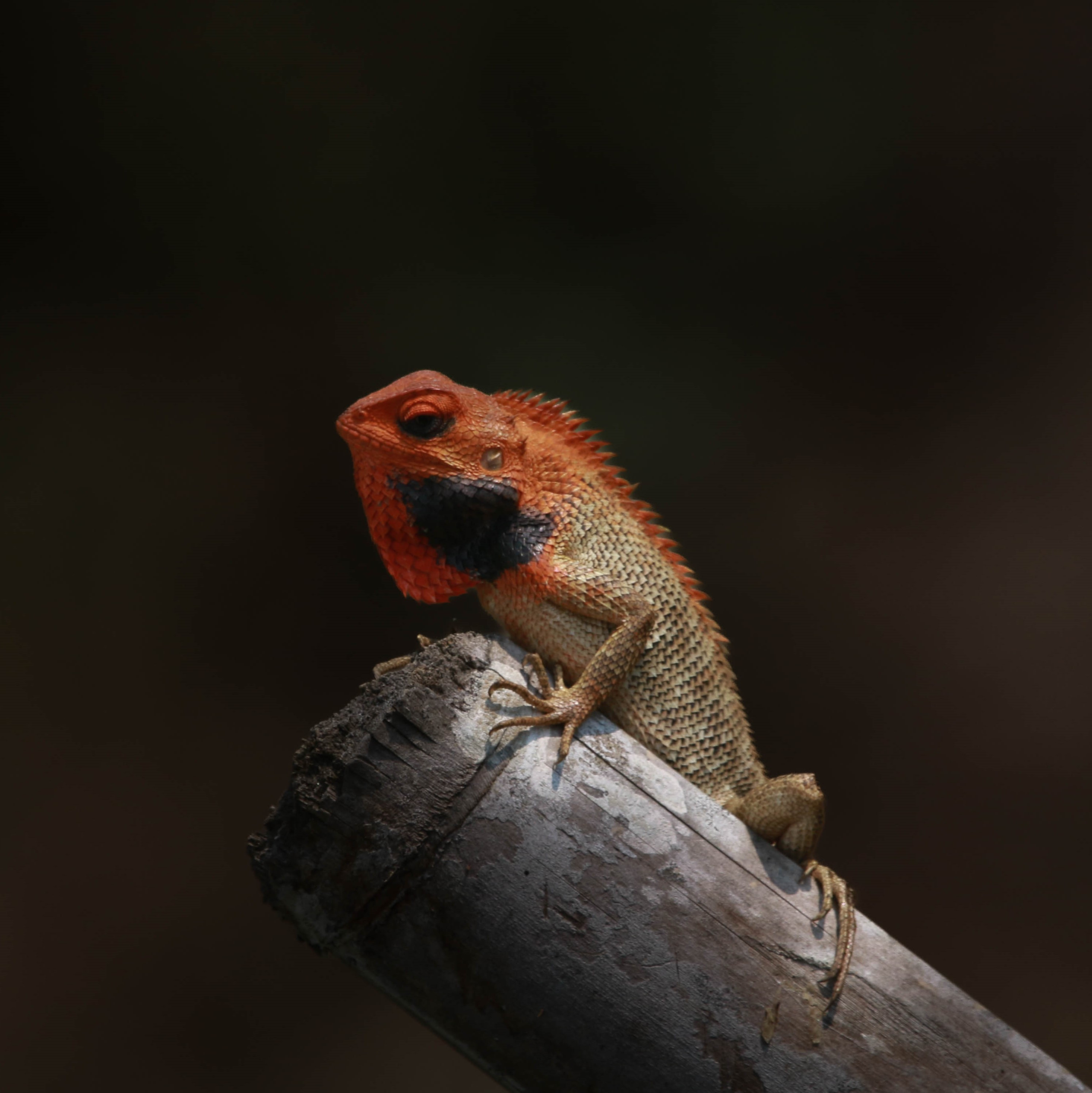
Common garden lizard, Nepal

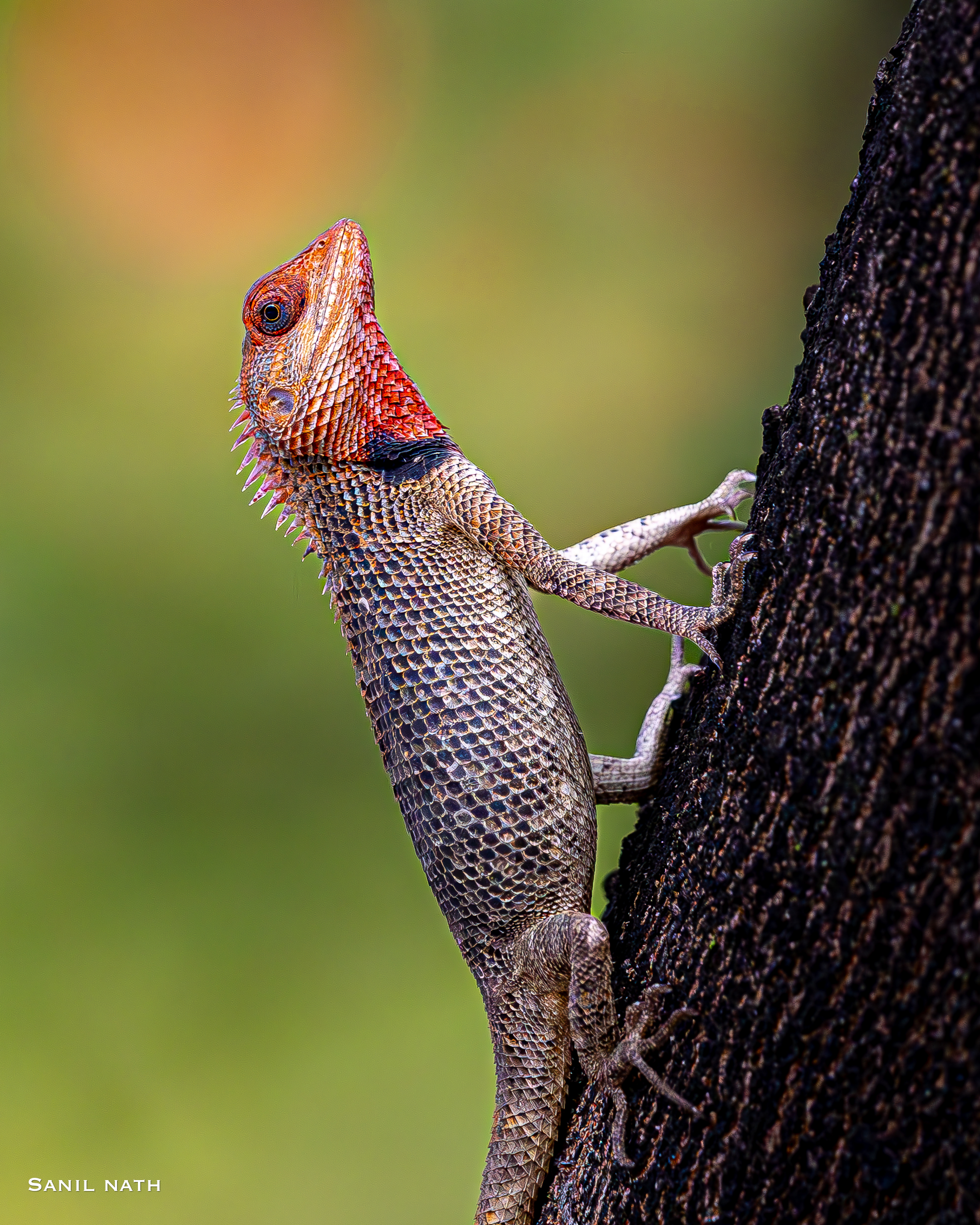
An Oriental garden lizard awaiting its prey in the concrete city of Hyderabad.

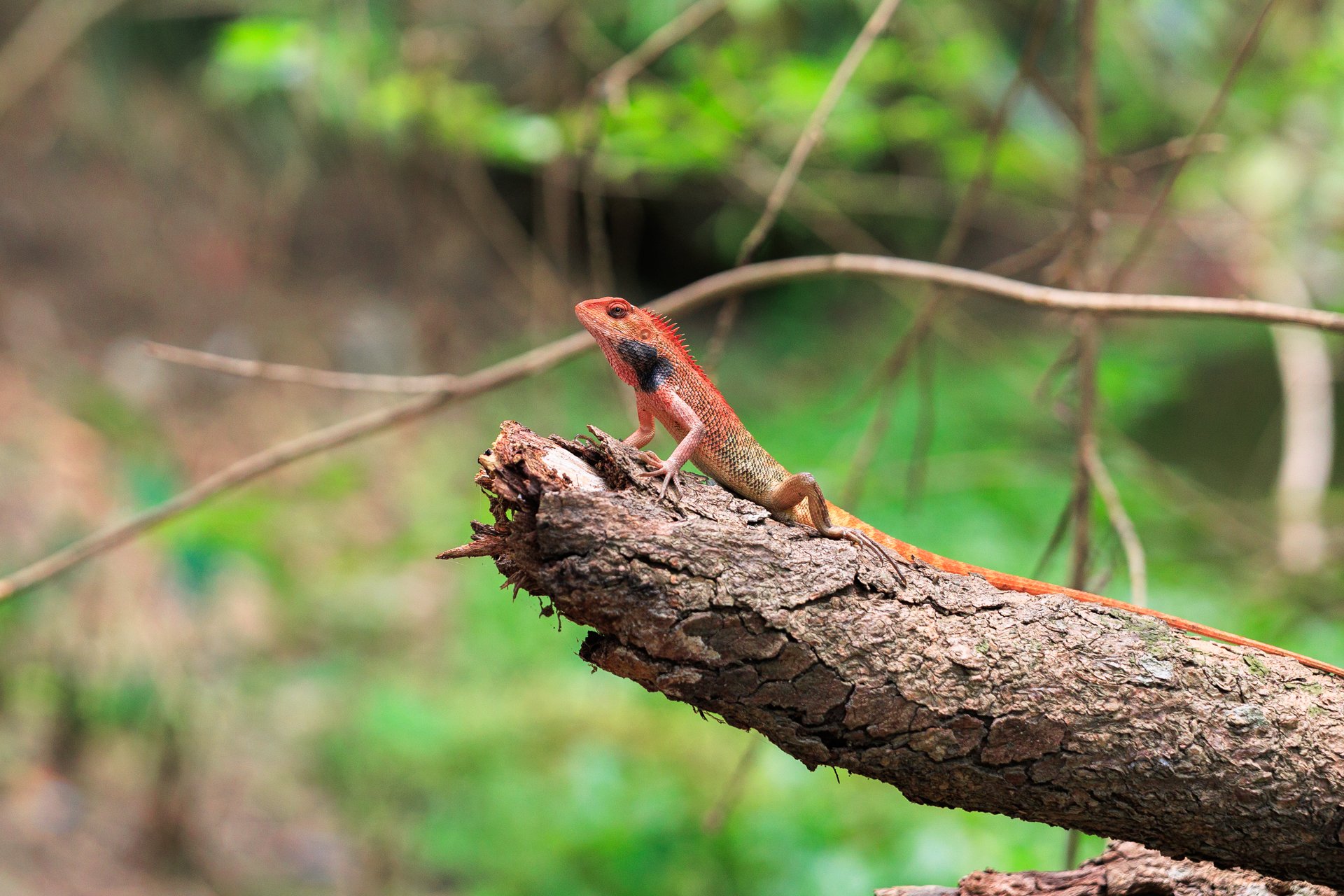
