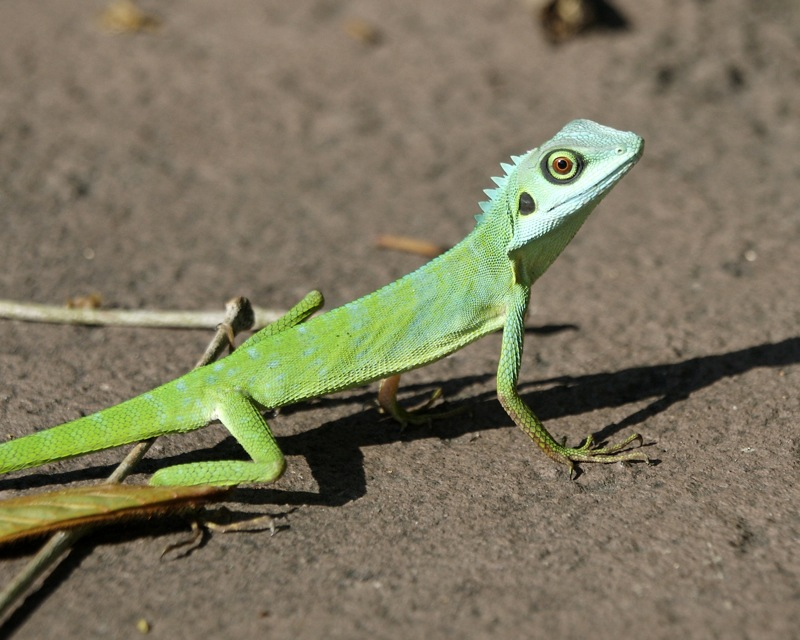
- Bronchocela cristatella

Scientific classification
- Kingdom: Animalia
- Phylum: Chordata
- Class: Reptilia
- Order: Squamata
- Suborder: Iguania
- Family: Agamidae
- Subfamily: Draconinae
- Genus: Bronchocela; Kaup, 1827

= Bronchocela =

Genus of lizards

Bronchocela is a genus of Asian lizards, commonly known as bloodsuckers, crested lizards, and forest lizards, in the family Agamidae.

== Species ==
There are 15 species in the genus Bronchocela:

Image	Name	Distribution
	Bronchocela burmana Blanford, 1878 – Burmese green crested lizard	Malay Peninsula to southern Myanmar and Thailand.
	Bronchocela celebensis Gray, 1845 – Sulawesi bloodsucker	Indonesia
	Bronchocela cristatella (Kuhl, 1820) – green crested lizard	Malaysia (West Malaysia and Borneo), Singapore, Indonesia, Philippines (Palawan, Calamian Islands, Panay, Luzon), South Thailand, and south Myanmar (Tenasserim Hills).
	Bronchocela cyanopalpebra Chandramouli, Adhikari, Amarasinghe & Abinawanto, 2023	India (Nicobar Islands)
	Bronchocela danieli (Tiwari & Biswas, 1973) – Daniel's bloodsucker, Daniel's forest lizard	Great Nicobar Island, India.
	Bronchocela hayeki (L. Müller, 1928) – Sumatra bloodsucker	Indonesia
	Bronchocela jubata A.M.C. Duméril & Bibron, 1837 – maned forest lizard	Indonesia, Thailand, Cambodia and Philippines
	Bronchocela marmorata Gray, 1845 – marbled bloodsucker	Philippines
	Bronchocela nicobarica Chandramouli, Adhikari, Amarasinghe & Abinawanto, 2023	India (Nicobar Islands)
	Bronchocela orlovi Hallermann, 2004 – Orlov's forest lizard	Vietnam
	Bronchocela rayaensis Grismer, Wood, Lee, Quah, Anuar, Ngadi & Sites, 2015 – Gunung Raya green crested lizard	Peninsular Malaysia and Thailand
	Bronchocela rubrigularis Hallermann, 2009	Nicobar Islands
	Bronchocela shenlong Grismer, Wood, Lee, Quah, Anuar, Ngadi & Sites, 2015	Malaysia
	Bronchocela smaragdina Günther, 1864 – Günther's bloodsucker	Cambodia, Thailand, Vietnam
	Bronchocela vietnamensis Hallermann & Orlov, 2005	Vietnam

Nota bene: A binomial authority in parentheses indicates that the species was originally described in a genus other than Bronchocela.
