= Bronchocela orlovi =

Conservation status
- Data Deficient (IUCN 3.1)

Scientific classification
- Kingdom: Animalia
- Phylum: Chordata
- Class: Reptilia
- Order: Squamata
- Suborder: Iguania
- Family: Agamidae
- Genus: Bronchocela
- Species: B. orlovi

Binomial name
- Bronchocela orlovi Hallermann, 2004

Species of lizard

Bronchocela orlovi, also known commonly as Orlov's forest lizard, is a species of lizard in the subfamily Draconinae of the family Agamidae. The species is endemic to Vietnam

== Etymology ==
The specific name, orlovi, is in honor of Russian herpetologist Nikolai Liutsianovich Orlov.

== Geographic distribution ==
Bronchocela orlovi is found in Gia Lai province in the Central Highlands of Vietnam.

== Habitat ==
The natural habitat of Bronchocela orlovi is forest, at elevations of approximately 750 m (2,460 ft).

== Behavior ==
Bronchocela orlovi is arboreal and diurnal.

== Reproduction ==
Bronchocela orlovi is oviparous.
