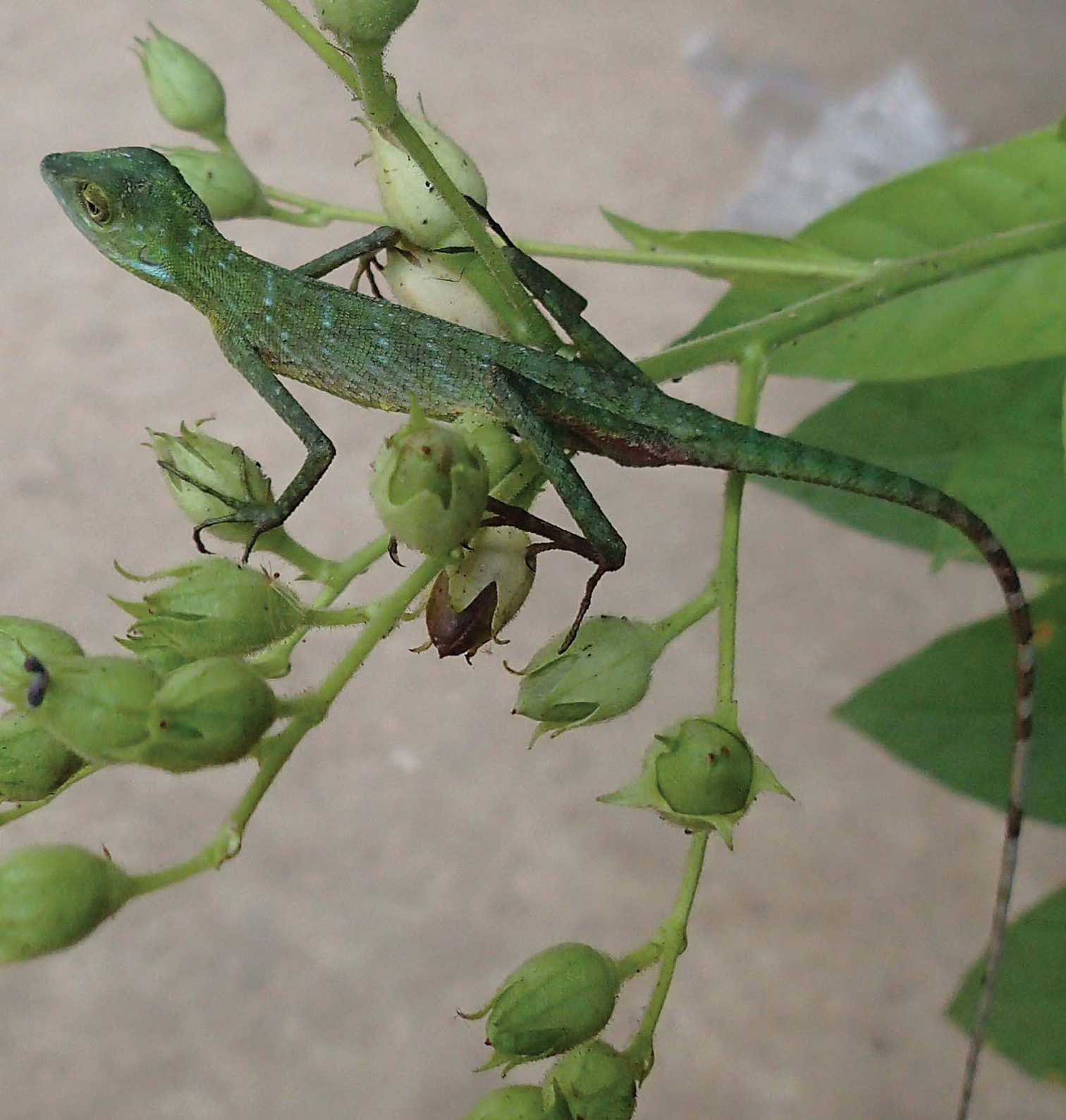

Conservation status
- Least Concern (IUCN 3.1)

Scientific classification
- Kingdom: Animalia
- Phylum: Chordata
- Class: Reptilia
- Order: Squamata
- Suborder: Iguania
- Family: Agamidae
- Genus: Bronchocela
- Species: B. burmana

Binomial name
- Bronchocela burmana Blanford, 1878

= Bronchocela burmana =

Species of lizard

Bronchocela burmana, the Burmese green crested lizard, is a species of agamid lizard. It is endemic to Malay Peninsula and is known from southern Myanmar and Thailand.
