= Bronchocela shenlong =

Conservation status
- Near Threatened (IUCN 3.1)

Scientific classification
- Kingdom: Animalia
- Phylum: Chordata
- Class: Reptilia
- Order: Squamata
- Suborder: Iguania
- Family: Agamidae
- Genus: Bronchocela
- Species: B. shenlong

Binomial name
- Bronchocela shenlong Grismer, Wood, Lee, Quah, Anuar, Ngadi, & Sites, 2015

Species of lizard

Bronchocela shenlong is a species of lizard. It is endemic to Malaysia.
