= Bronchocela smaragdina =

Günther's bloodsucker

Conservation status
- Least Concern (IUCN 3.1)

Scientific classification
- Kingdom: Animalia
- Phylum: Chordata
- Class: Reptilia
- Order: Squamata
- Suborder: Iguania
- Family: Agamidae
- Genus: Bronchocela
- Species: B. smaragdina

Binomial name
- Bronchocela smaragdina Günther, 1864

Synonyms
- Calotes smaragdinus (Günther, 1864)

Species of lizard

Bronchocela smaragdina, also commonly known as Günther's bloodsucker, is a Southeast Asian species of agamid lizard.

== Geographic range ==
- Cambodia
- Thailand
- Vietnam
