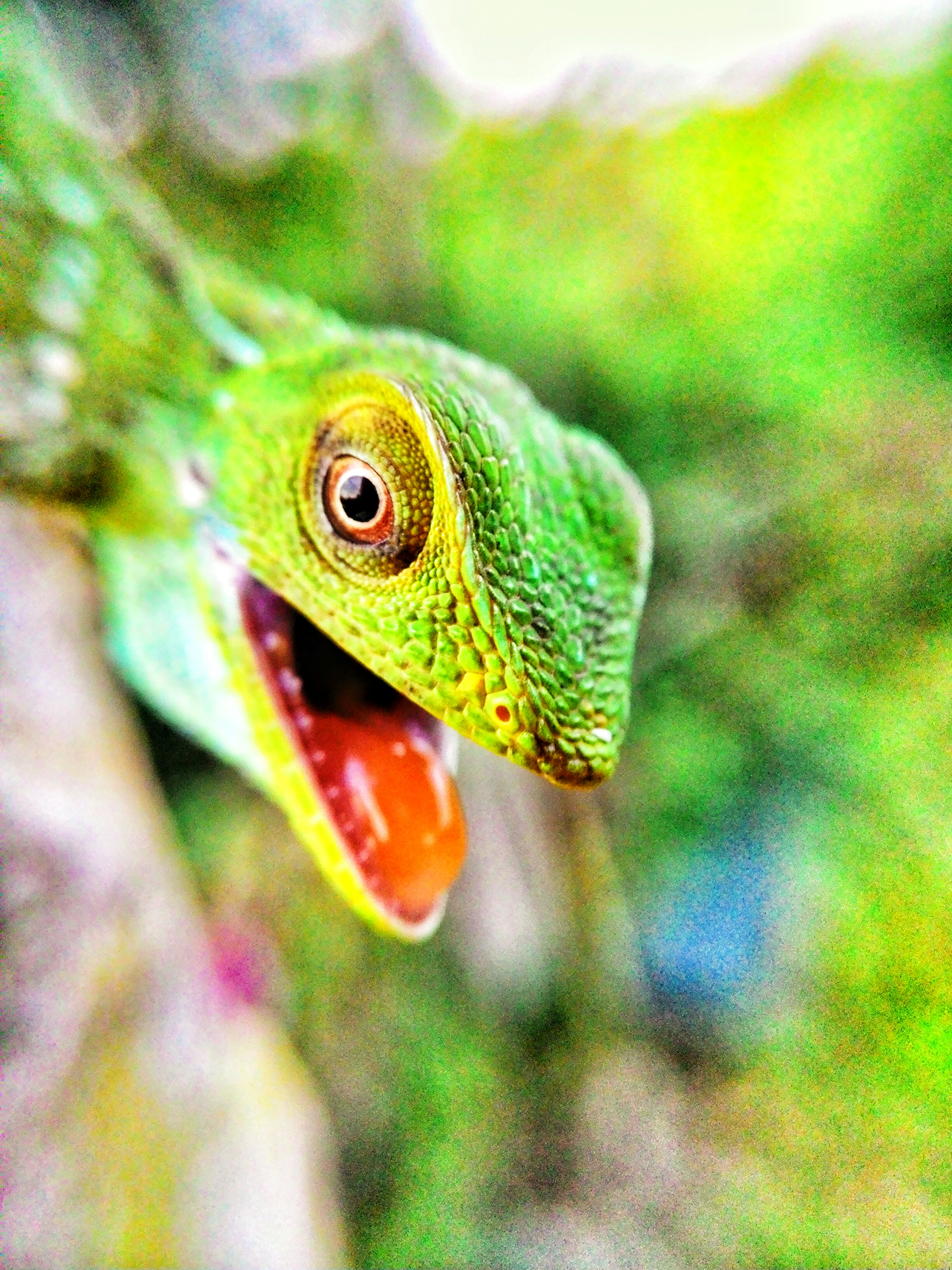

Conservation status
- Least Concern (IUCN 3.1)

Scientific classification
- Kingdom: Animalia
- Phylum: Chordata
- Class: Reptilia
- Order: Squamata
- Suborder: Iguania
- Family: Agamidae
- Genus: Bronchocela
- Species: B. jubata

Binomial name
- Bronchocela jubata A.M.C. Duméril & Bibron, 1837
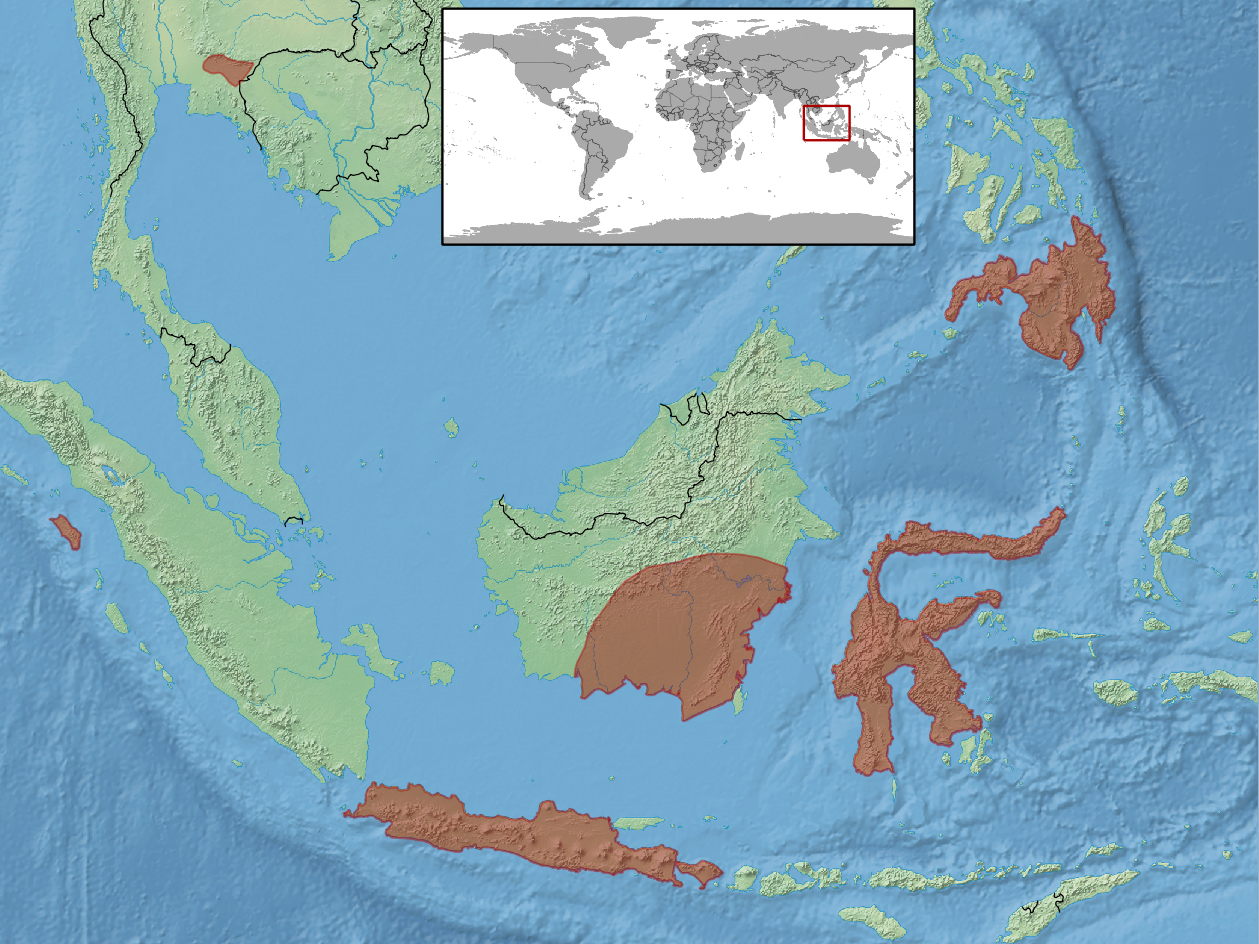

Synonyms
- Bronchocela jubata A.M.C. Duméril & Bibron, 1837; Calotes jubatus — Boulenger, 1885; Bronchocela jubata — Moody, 1980

= Bronchocela jubata =

Species of lizard

Bronchocela jubata, commonly known as the maned forest lizard, is a species of agamid lizard found mainly in Indonesia on the islands of Singkep, Java, Bali, parts of Malaysia Sulawesi, Karakelang, Salibabu; Nias Island, Singkap Island, Borneo (Kalimantan) also in Thailand, Cambodia and Philippines. Although in the past it was thought the species may be found in India, either on the mainland or in the Nicobars, this is not the case according to herpetologist Das. It is also known by the common name of "bloodsucker", although this is a misnomer.

== Description ==
Bronchocela jubata is 550 mm (22 in) in total length, with a long hanging tail making up four fifths of its total length. It has a jagged crest on its neck which more closely resemble hairs, as opposed to the crest of its close relative, B. cristatella, which more closely resembles the points on a crown. The crest consists of elongated scales, although it is flabby like skin.

The head is square in shape, and there is a soft sack under the chin. It has large, flexible eyelids made of fine speckled scales.

The dorsal area is coloured from light green to dark green, and the lizard can change to brown or black if feeling threatened. A rusty-coloured stain appears under the throat. More spots, often blurring to form a stripe, appear on the shoulder and the front lateral side. Towards the back of the lizard, the colour becomes duller.

The underside of the lizard is yellowish to white under the chin, neck, stomach and the back of the legs. The bottom of the hands and feet are a yellowish brown. The tail is coloured green at its base, with bluish stains. Towards the end of the tail, the colour becomes a dull brown with whitish spots on the tip.

The scales of Bronchocela jubata are hard, course and strong. The tail has an angular feel.

=== Taxonomic diagnosis ===
Head-scales above rather large, keeled, almost equal; two or three compressed scales behind the supraciliary edge; tympanum large, half or more than half the diameter of the orbit. Nine or ten upper and eight or nine lower labials; a row of slightly enlarged scales on each side of the chin parallel to the labials. A gular sac, with large keeled scales; no fold in front of the shoulder. Nuchal crest large, its spines falciform and directed backwards, the longest about as long as the diameter of the orbit; some rows of smaller spines at the base. Body strongly compressed, covered with large, keeled scales, 43-53 round the middle of the body; the scales of the first row next to the dorsal crest pointing upwards, those of the second row pointing straight backwards, the others downwards; dorsal crest less developed than nuchal, diminishing backwards. Ventral scales largest of all, strongly keeled. Tail very long, round, slightly compressed at the base and with a slight ridge there. Limbs long, the hind limb nearly reaches the nostril; digits long, third and fourth fingers equal, fifth toe much shorter than third. Green above, with yellow or red spots or bands. Length of head and body 130 mm.; tail 440 mm.

== Habits ==
Bronchocela jubata is generally to be found in low bushes or hidden in dense trees. It can frequently be seen having fallen from the bushes or trees while chasing its prey, although it will quickly run back into the security of the nearest bush or tree. The lizard preys on butterflies, moths, dragonflies, flies and other small insects. To catch its prey, Bronchocela jubata will generally wait in silence at the top of a tree, or it will rock slowly back and forth as if swaying in the breeze. It can also frequently be found utilising domestic electricity cables to cross from one place to another.

== Reproduction ==
Bronchocela jubata lays its eggs in loose earth, sand or humus. Like most members of the Agamidae, the mother lizard excavates the earth to form a hollow for the eggs with her snout. The eggs are white, waxy, and leathery in texture.

A study carried out in the Situgede jungle, near Bogor, noted that the eggs of Bronchocela jubata were buried in sandy soil beneath a layer of humus, directly beneath bushes in a fairly open part of the forest. The two eggs were elongated, approximately 7 x 40mm in length, placed side by side, and covered by a thin layer of soil. In Walat Mountain, Sukabumi, there were eggs covered by a thin layer of humus in the middle of a jungle path.
