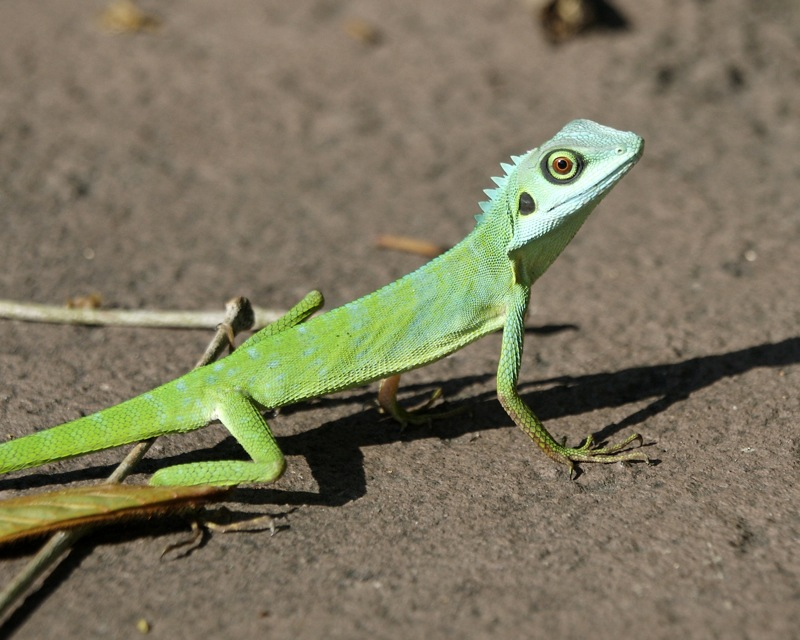

Scientific classification
- Kingdom: Animalia
- Phylum: Chordata
- Class: Reptilia
- Order: Squamata
- Suborder: Iguania
- Family: Agamidae
- Genus: Bronchocela
- Species: B. cristatella

Binomial name
- Bronchocela cristatella (Kuhl, 1820)

Synonyms
- Agama cristatella Kuhl, 1820; Bronchocela cristatella — Kaup, 1827; Calotes cristatellus — Boulenger, 1885; Bronchocela cristatella — Manthey, 1983

= Bronchocela cristatella =

Species of lizard

Bronchocela cristatella, also known as the green crested lizard, is a species of agamid lizard endemic to Southeast Asia.

== Geographic range ==
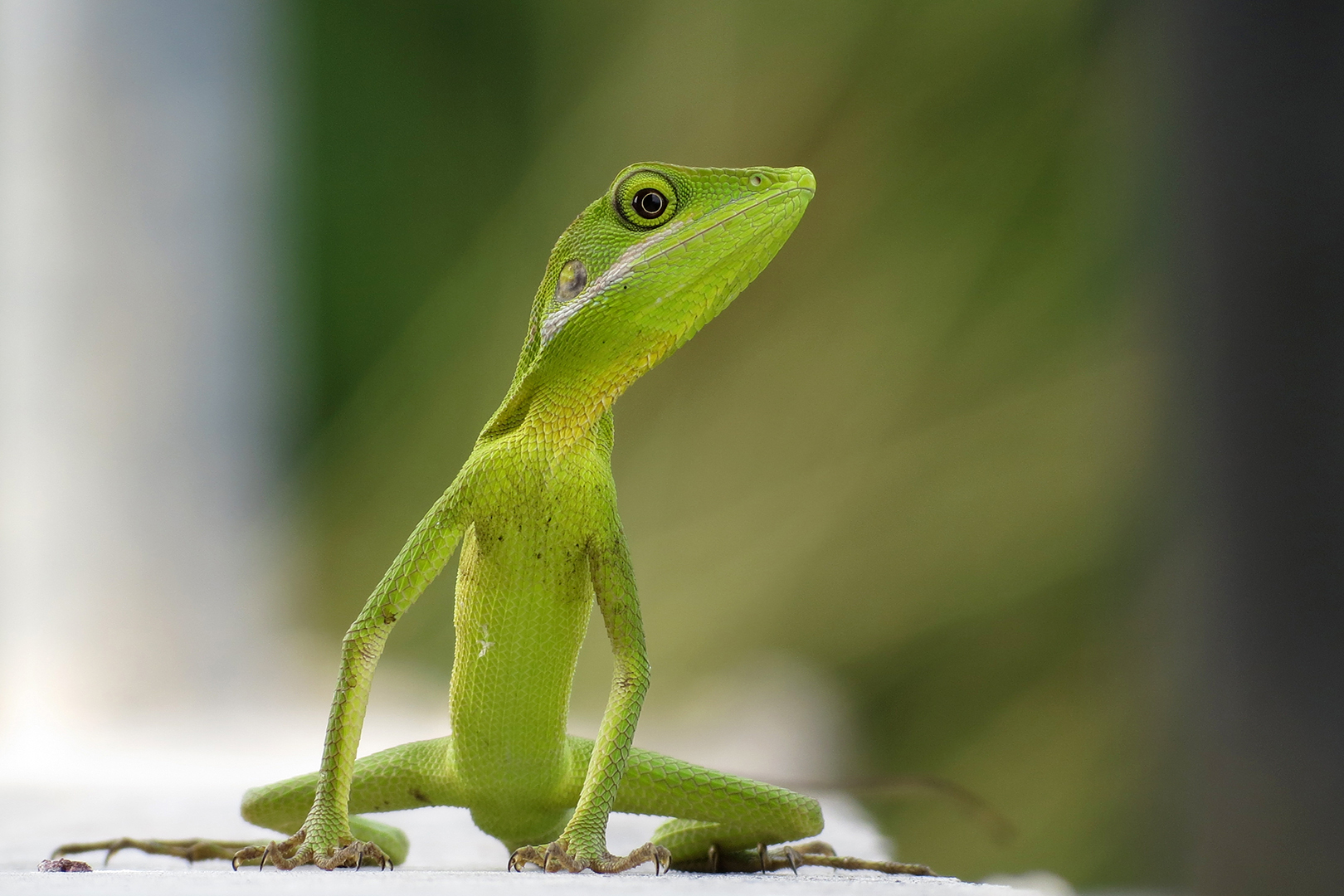
Bronchocela cristatella

B. cristatella is found in Malaysia (West Malaysia and Borneo), Singapore, Indonesia, Philippines (Palawan, Calamian Islands, Panay, Luzon), South Thailand, south Myanmar (Tenasserim Hills), and India (Nicobar Islands).

== Description ==
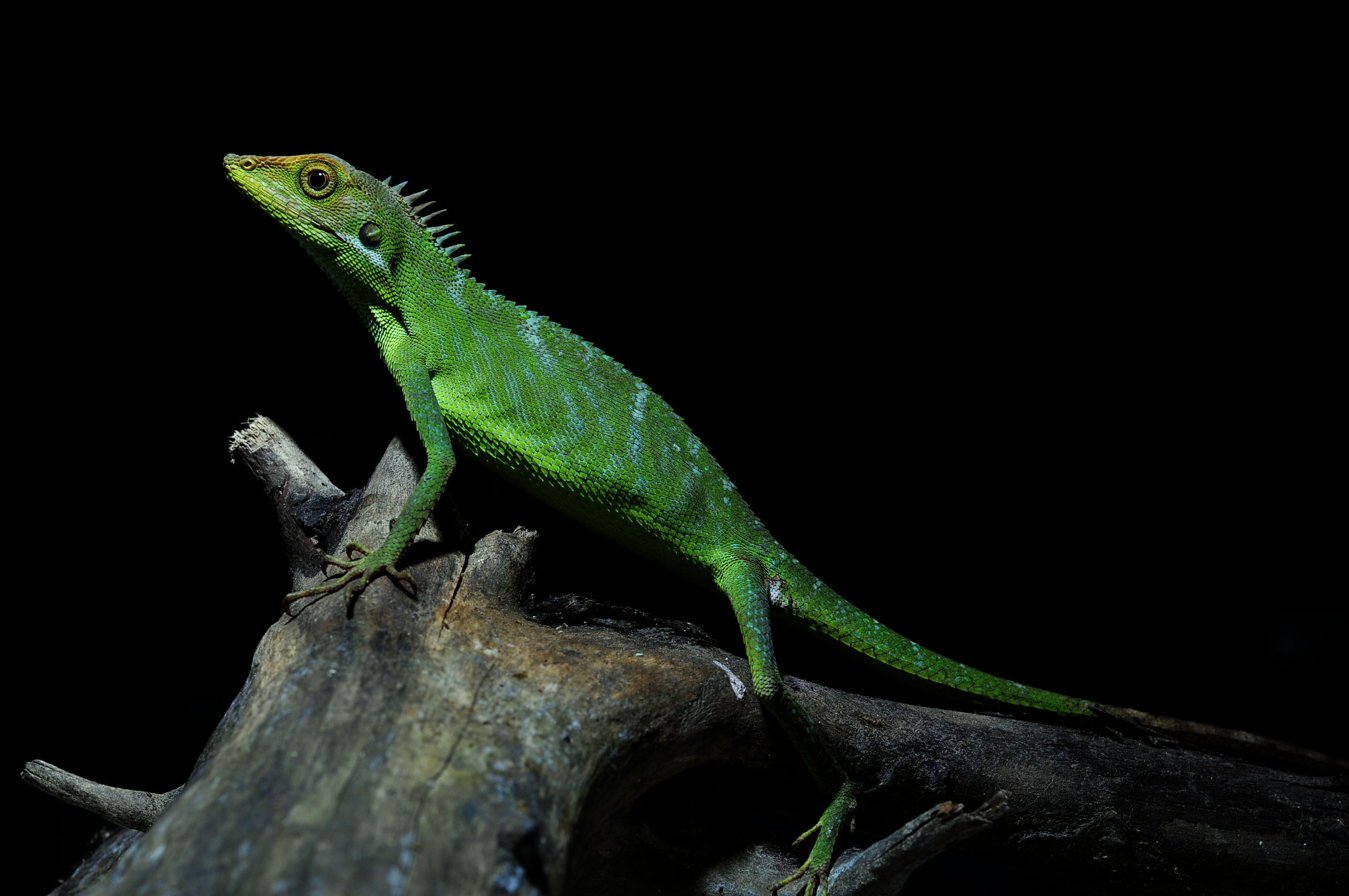
Bronchocela cristatella

This species is a bright green lizard, sometimes possessing a blue tint on the head. It is able to change colour, turning darker brown when threatened. There is a dark ring around each eye, and a dark spot at the back of the head. The males have a crest on the neck. It has a very long and thin tail (75% of total length). The body length is of 13 cm (5.1 in), and the total length (body + tail) is of 57 cm (22 in).

From C.A.L. Günther (1864) The Reptiles of British India.

Scales of the sides small, there being about forty in one of the transverse scries; ventral scales much larger, in fourteen longitudinal rows. A short scries of three or four larger scales forms a continuation of the superciliary margin; no other large scale on the temple. Nuchal crest low, formed by triangular spines; it is not continued on the back, where the vertebral scales arc scarcely prominent. The fourth hind toe is one-eighth longer than the third. Uniform grass-green. This species is very common in the Malayan countries and in numerous islands of the East Indian Archipelago—Sumatra, Java, Amboyna, Celebes, Borneo, Booroo, Philippines, &c. It moves and leaps with great quickness among the branches of trees. Cantor saw the colours of these lizards change suddenly to grey, brownish or blackish, sometimes with orange spots or with indistinct black network; large, isolated, round black spots appeared on the head or back or round the tympanum. It attains to a length of 20 inches, the tail measuring 16 inches.

== Habitat ==
B. cristatella is found in forests as well as parks and rural areas.

== Conservation status ==
In Singapore, the range of B. cristatella is declining as it is in competition with the introduced species Calotes versicolor (changeable lizard).
