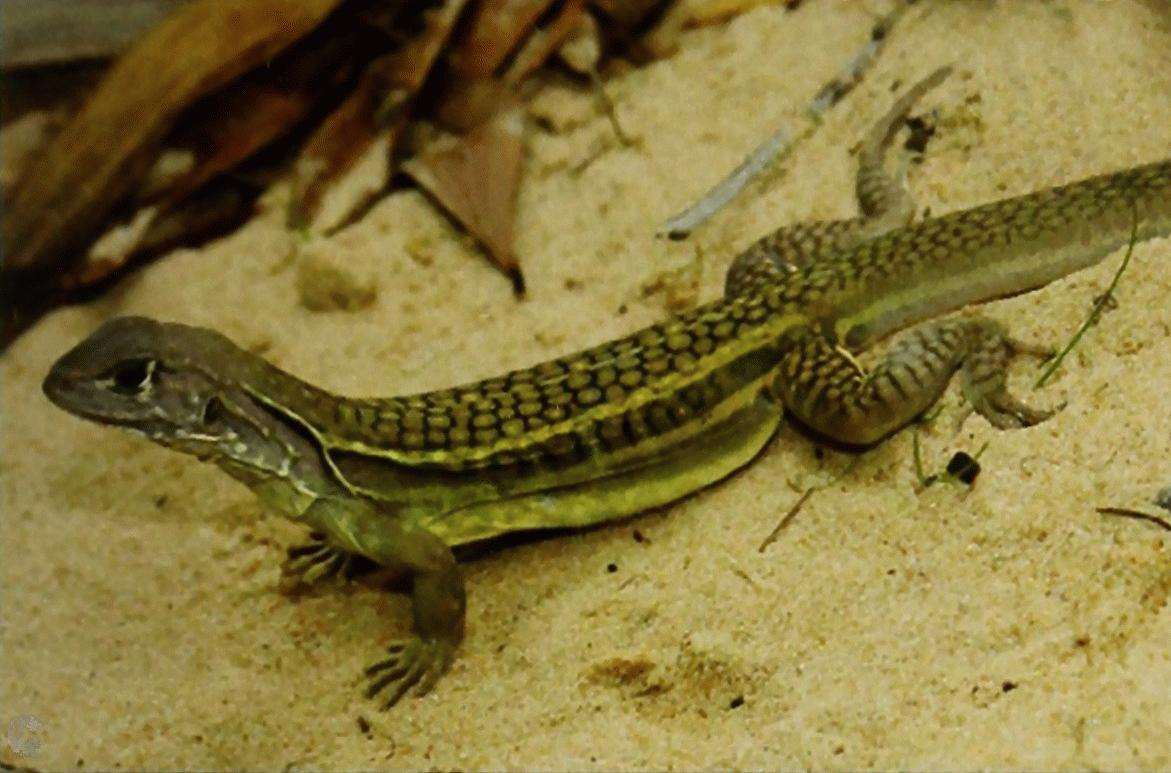

Conservation status
- Vulnerable (IUCN 3.1)

Scientific classification
- Kingdom: Animalia
- Phylum: Chordata
- Class: Reptilia
- Order: Squamata
- Suborder: Iguania
- Family: Agamidae
- Genus: Leiolepis
- Species: L. ngovantrii

Binomial name
- Leiolepis ngovantrii J. Grismer & L. Grismer, 2010

= Leiolepis ngovantrii =

Species of lizard

Leiolepis ngovantrii (Vietnamese: Nhông cát trinh sản, meaning "parthenogenic sand iguana") is a species of lizard in the family Agamidae. The species is all-female, reproducing clonally. The species is named after Vietnamese herpetologist Ngo Van Tri (born 1969) of the Vietnam Academy of Science and Technology, and is believed to be closely related to two other Vietnamese lizard species, Leiolepis guttata and Leiolepis guentherpetersi. This species is one of four unisexual Leiolepis species. However, the genus Leiolepis also has five bisexual species. This unisexuality is possibly due to mutation and hybridization.

== Description ==
Specimens of Leiolepis ngovantrii in the type series measure 95–127 mm (3.7–5.0 in) in snout-to-vent length (SVL) The lizard's back is covered with brown spots, with pairs of yellow stripes running along her sides. Her coloring provides adequate camouflage in coastal sandy soil, as well as in the mangrove forests during the dry season when grasses and leaves turn pale yellow.

== Scientific discovery ==
Though the Leiolepis ngovantrii has been long known to and enjoyed by locals in Vietnam's Mekong River Delta, scientists described the species in 2010 after seeing it sold and eaten in many remote Vietnamese village restaurants in Bà Rịa–Vũng Tàu province, South Vietnam.

== Habitat ==
The preferred natural habitat of Leiolepis ngovantrii is coastal dunes, at elevations from sea level to 30 m (98 ft).

== Behavior ==
Leiolepis ngovantrii is terrestrial and diurnal.
