= Reeves's butterfly lizard =

There are two species of lizard named Reeves's butterfly lizard:

- Leiolepis reevesii, endemic to Asia
- Leiolepis rubritaeniata, native to Thailand, Laos, Cambodia, and Vietnam
