= Leiolepis triploida =

Conservation status
- Data Deficient (IUCN 3.1)

Scientific classification
- Kingdom: Animalia
- Phylum: Chordata
- Class: Reptilia
- Order: Squamata
- Suborder: Iguania
- Family: Agamidae
- Genus: Leiolepis
- Species: L. triploida

Binomial name
- Leiolepis triploida Peters, 1971

Species of lizard

Leiolepis triploida, also known as the Thai butterfly lizard or Malaysian butterfly lizard, is a species of agamid lizard that is all-female (parthenogenetic). It is found in Southern Thailand and Peninsular Malaysia.

== Description ==
Leiolepis triploida measure 99–137 mm (3.9–5.4 in) in snout–vent length. It is a triploid species and reproduces asexually. Its likely maternal ancestor is Leiolepis boehmei, an asexual but diploid species; the two are morphologically similar but L. triploida is larger.
