= Cnemaspis neangthyi =

Conservation status
- Endangered (IUCN 3.1)

Scientific classification
- Kingdom: Animalia
- Phylum: Chordata
- Class: Reptilia
- Order: Squamata
- Suborder: Gekkota
- Family: Gekkonidae
- Genus: Cnemaspis
- Species: C. neangthyi

Binomial name
- Cnemaspis neangthyi J. Grismer, L. Grismer & Chav, 2010

Species of lizard

Cnemaspis neangthyi, also known commonly as Neang Thy's rock gecko, is an endangered species of lizard in the family Gekkonidae. The species is endemic to Cambodia.

== Etymology ==
The specific name, neangthyi, is in honor of Cambodian herpetologist Neang Thy (born 1970).

== Geographic range ==
Cnemaspis neangthyi is found in the Cardamom Mountains in Pursat Province, Cambodia.

== Habitat ==
The preferred natural habitat of Cnemaspis neangthyi is boulders and rock cliff faces in forest, at elevations around 145 m (476 ft).

== Description ==
The maximum recorded snout-to-vent length (SVL) for Cnemaspis neangthyi is 5.4 cm (2.1 in). Dorsally, it has a light-colored chevron between the shoulders. The tip of the tail is white with black specks.

== Behavior ==
Cnemaspis neangthyi is nocturnal, terrestrial, and saxicolous (rock-dwelling).

== Reproduction ==
Cnemaspis neangthyi is oviparous.
