= Larutia seribuatensis =

Conservation status
- Near Threatened (IUCN 3.1)

Scientific classification
- Kingdom: Animalia
- Phylum: Chordata
- Class: Reptilia
- Order: Squamata
- Family: Scincidae
- Genus: Larutia
- Species: L. seribuatensis

Binomial name
- Larutia seribuatensis Grismer, Leong, & Yaakob, 2003

Species of lizard

Larutia seribuatensis, also known as the two-lined two-toed skink or Seribuat larut skink, is a species of skink. It is endemic to the Seribuat Archipelago (Malaysia) and occurs on Tioman Island as well as its small neighbor, Tulai Island.
