= Larutia puehensis =

Conservation status
- Data Deficient (IUCN 3.1)

Scientific classification
- Kingdom: Animalia
- Phylum: Chordata
- Class: Reptilia
- Order: Squamata
- Family: Scincidae
- Genus: Larutia
- Species: L. puehensis

Binomial name
- Larutia puehensis Grismer, Leong, & Yaakob, 2003

Species of lizard

Larutia puehensis, also known as the Berumput two-toed skink, is a species of skink. It is only known from holotype collected from Gunung Berumput (=Mt. Berumput) in Pueh Mountains, Sarawak, Malaysian Borneo.
