= Larutia penangensis =

Conservation status
- Critically Endangered (IUCN 3.1)

Scientific classification
- Kingdom: Animalia
- Phylum: Chordata
- Class: Reptilia
- Order: Squamata
- Family: Scincidae
- Genus: Larutia
- Species: L. penangensis

Binomial name
- Larutia penangensis Grismer, Quah, Siler, Chan, Wood, Grismer, Sah, & Ahmad, 2011

Species of lizard

Larutia penangensis, known as the Penang Island larut skink, is a species of skink. It is endemic to Penang Island, Malaysia.
