= Larutia kecil =

Scientific classification
- Kingdom: Animalia
- Phylum: Chordata
- Class: Reptilia
- Order: Squamata
- Family: Scincidae
- Genus: Larutia
- Species: L. kecil

Binomial name
- Larutia kecil Fukuyama, Hikida, Hossman, & Nishikawa, 2019
- Larutia kecil is only known from Gunung Penrissen, Malaysian Borneo

Species of lizard

Larutia kecil is a species of skink. It is endemic to Sarawak, Malaysian Borneo, where it is known from Gunung Penrissen (=Mt. Penrissen). It is a small species within its genus, reaching 84 mm (3.3 in) in snout–vent length.
