= Larutia miodactyla =

Conservation status
- Vulnerable (IUCN 3.1)

Scientific classification
- Kingdom: Animalia
- Phylum: Chordata
- Class: Reptilia
- Order: Squamata
- Family: Scincidae
- Genus: Larutia
- Species: L. miodactyla

Binomial name
- Larutia miodactyla (Boulenger, 1903)
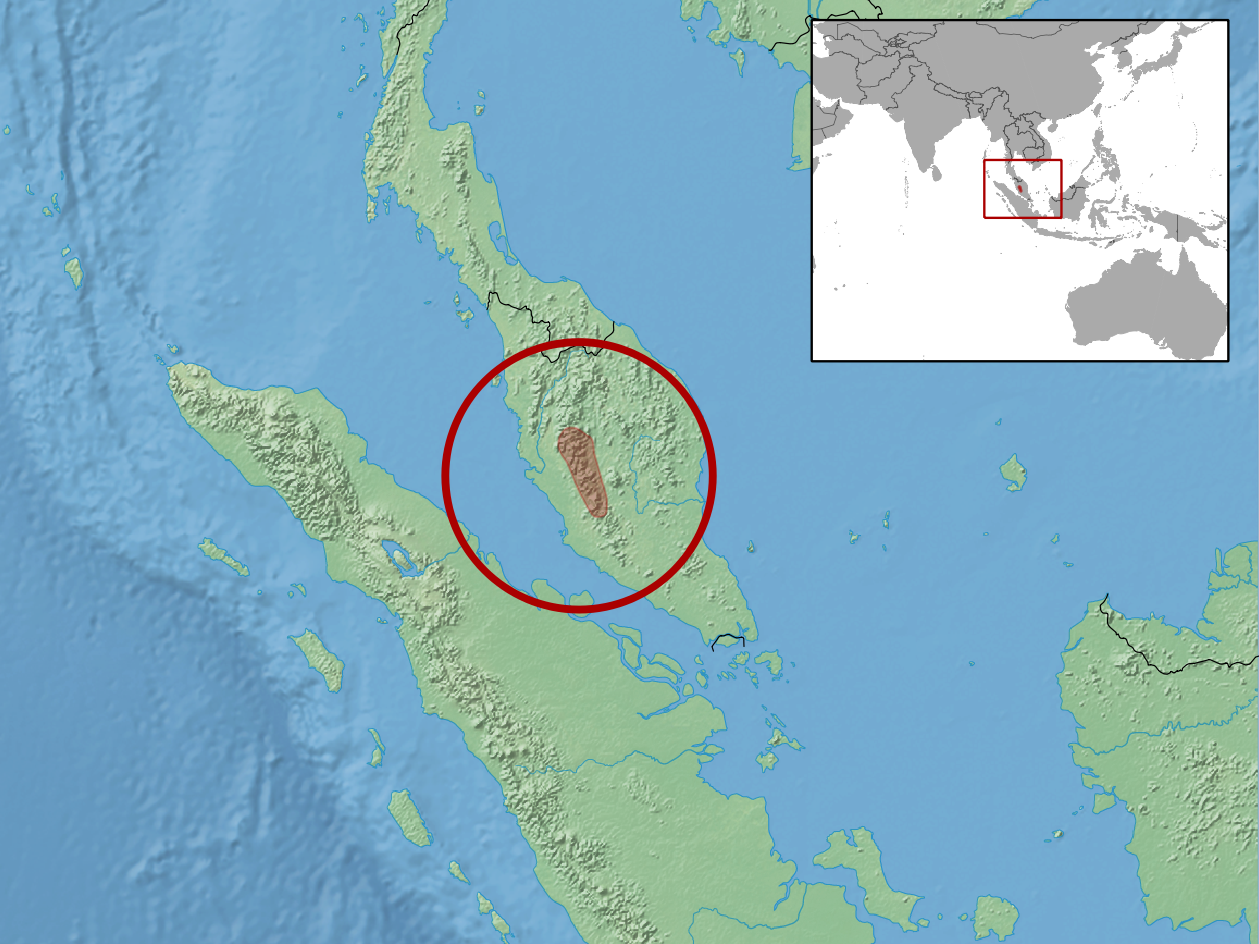

Species of lizard

Larutia miodactyla, the single finger larut skink or Titiwanga larut skink, is a species of skink. It is endemic to Peninsular Malaysia.
