= Larutia sumatrensis =

Conservation status
- Least Concern (IUCN 3.1)

Scientific classification
- Kingdom: Animalia
- Phylum: Chordata
- Class: Reptilia
- Order: Squamata
- Family: Scincidae
- Genus: Larutia
- Species: L. sumatrensis

Binomial name
- Larutia sumatrensis (Bleeker, 1860)
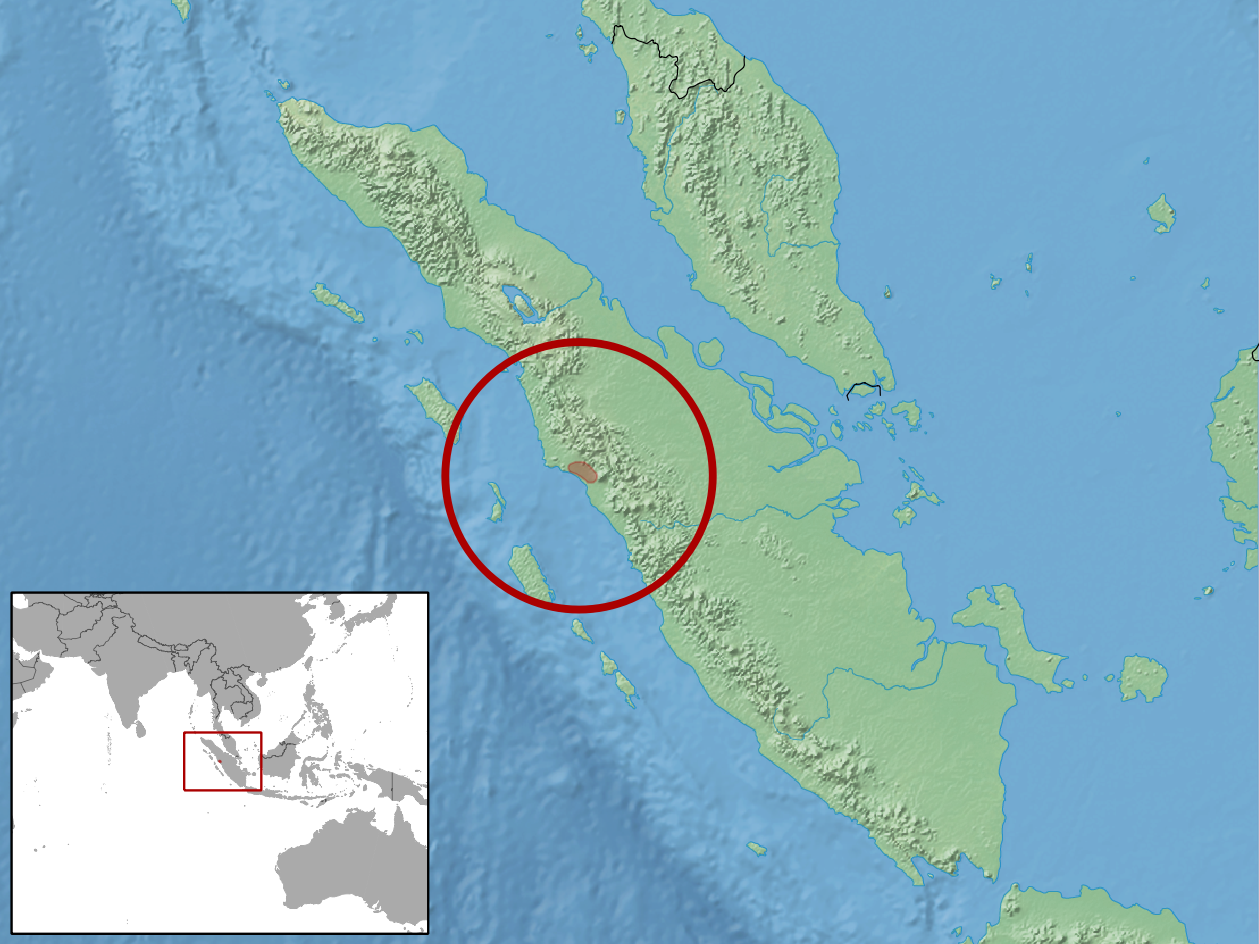

Species of lizard

Larutia sumatrensis is a species of skink. It is endemic to Sumatra (Indonesia).
