= John Reeves (naturalist) =

English naturalist (1774–1856)

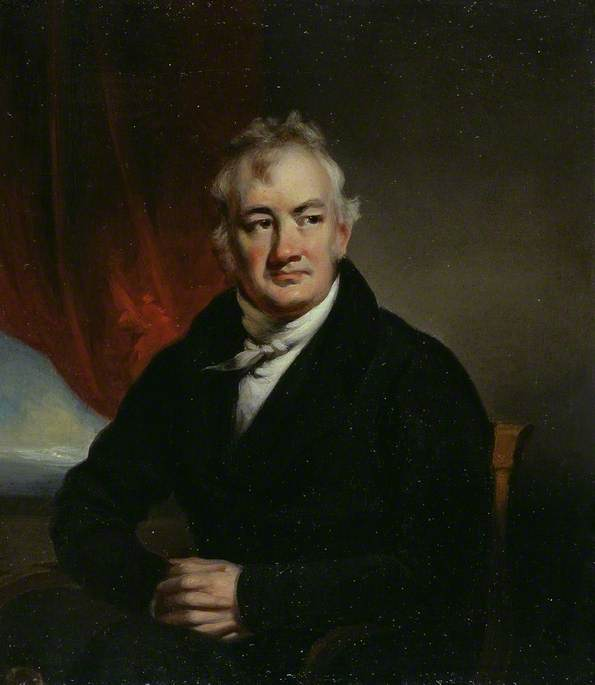

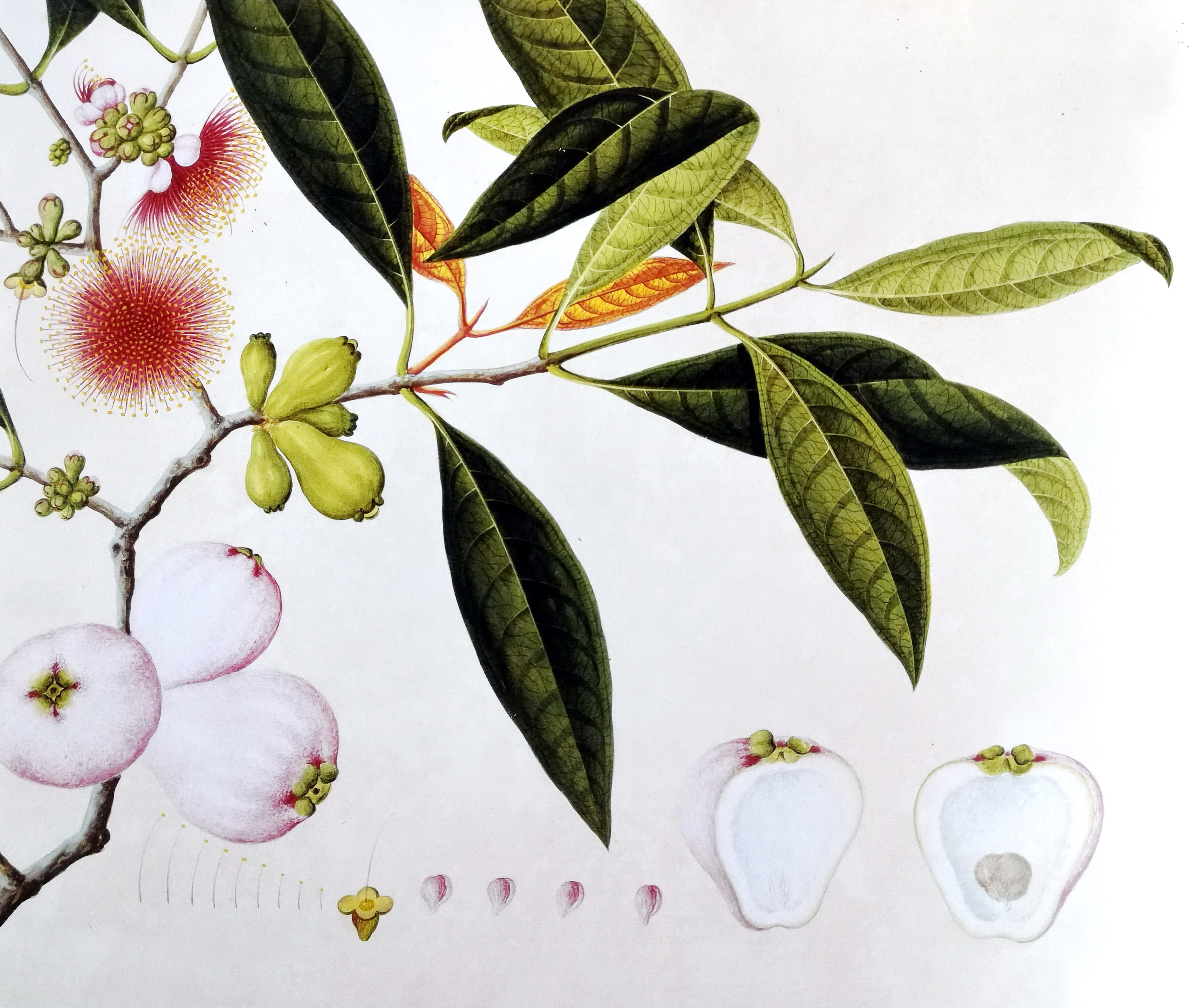
Syzygium malaccense painted by unknown Cantonese painter commissioned by John Reeves

John Reeves FRS FLS (1 May 1774 – 22 March 1856) was an English naturalist. He developed a notable collection of Chinese drawings of animals and plants. Reeves commissioned local Chinese artists to create the drawings, which are among the first examples of Chinese art done in the western style of scientific botanical and zoological illustration. Reeves was the son of Reverend Jonathan Reeves of West Ham, Essex. Orphaned young, he was educated at Christ's Hospital and started working with a tea merchant. His knowledge of teas got him an appointment of inspector of tea in 1808. In 1812 he was sent to China in the employment of the British East India Company. He was responsible for the introduction of a number of garden plants to the West including Wisteria. Reeves was a correspondent of the Horticultural Society of London to which he sent specimens. He also corresponded with Sir Joseph Banks, regularly sending him specimens. Reeves also took an interest in Chinese astronomy and herbal medicine, collaborating on these with the missionary and sinologist Robert Morrison. Reeves' son John Russell Reeves joined the tea business in 1827 and also took an interest in natural history and like his father, he too was elected into the Linnean and Royal Societies. Reeves senior returned to live in Clapham in 1831. He had sent specimens of the caterpillar fungus (Ophiocordyceps sinensis) to Britain.

Many of Reeves' Chinese drawings are held in the Lindley Library at the Royal Horticultural Society. Reeves is commemorated in the names of Reeves's muntjac and Reeves's pheasant. Four species of reptiles are also named in his honor: Gekko reevesii, Leiolepis reevesii, Mauremys reevesii, and Scincella reevesii.
