= Larutia trifasciata =

Conservation status
- Near Threatened (IUCN 3.1)

Scientific classification
- Kingdom: Animalia
- Phylum: Chordata
- Class: Reptilia
- Order: Squamata
- Suborder: Scinciformata
- Infraorder: Scincomorpha
- Family: Sphenomorphidae
- Genus: Larutia
- Species: L. trifasciata

Binomial name
- Larutia trifasciata (Tweedie, 1940)

Species of lizard

Larutia trifasciata, known as the three-banded larut skink, is a species of skink found in Malaysia.
