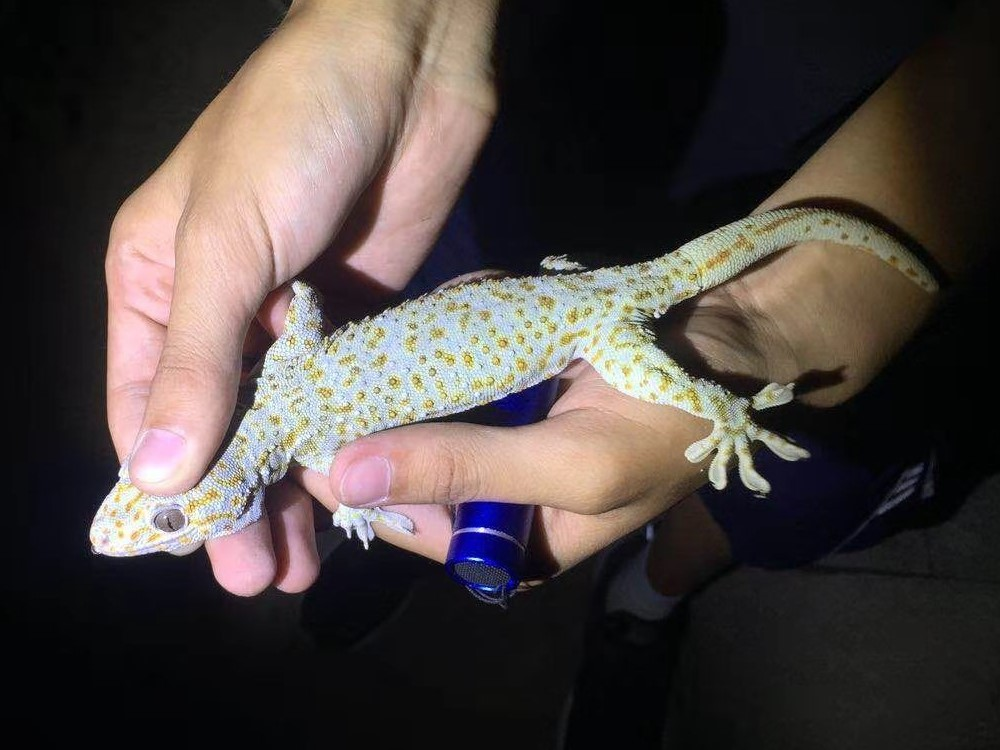

Conservation status
- Least Concern (IUCN 3.1)

Scientific classification
- Kingdom: Animalia
- Phylum: Chordata
- Class: Reptilia
- Order: Squamata
- Suborder: Gekkota
- Family: Gekkonidae
- Genus: Gekko
- Species: G. reevesii

Binomial name
- Gekko reevesii (Gray, 1831)

Synonyms
- Gecko [sic] reevesii Gray 1831; Gekko gecko Mertens, 1955; Gekko reevesii {{small Rösler et al., 2011}}; Gekko (Gekko) reevesii Wood et al., 2019

= Reeves's Tokay gecko =

Species of lizard

Reeves's tokay gecko (Gekko reevesii) is a species of lizard in the family Gekkonidae. The species is endemic to Asia.

== Etymology ==
The specific name, reevesii, is in honor of English naturalist John Reeves.

== Geographic range ==
G. reevesii is indigenous to China and northwestern Vietnam.
