= Larutia larutensis =

Conservation status
- Vulnerable (IUCN 3.1)

Scientific classification
- Kingdom: Animalia
- Phylum: Chordata
- Class: Reptilia
- Order: Squamata
- Family: Scincidae
- Genus: Larutia
- Species: L. larutensis

Binomial name
- Larutia larutensis (Boulenger, 1900)

Species of lizard

Larutia larutensis, also known as the black larut skink or Larut Hills larut skink, is a species of skink. It is endemic to Peninsular Malaysia.
