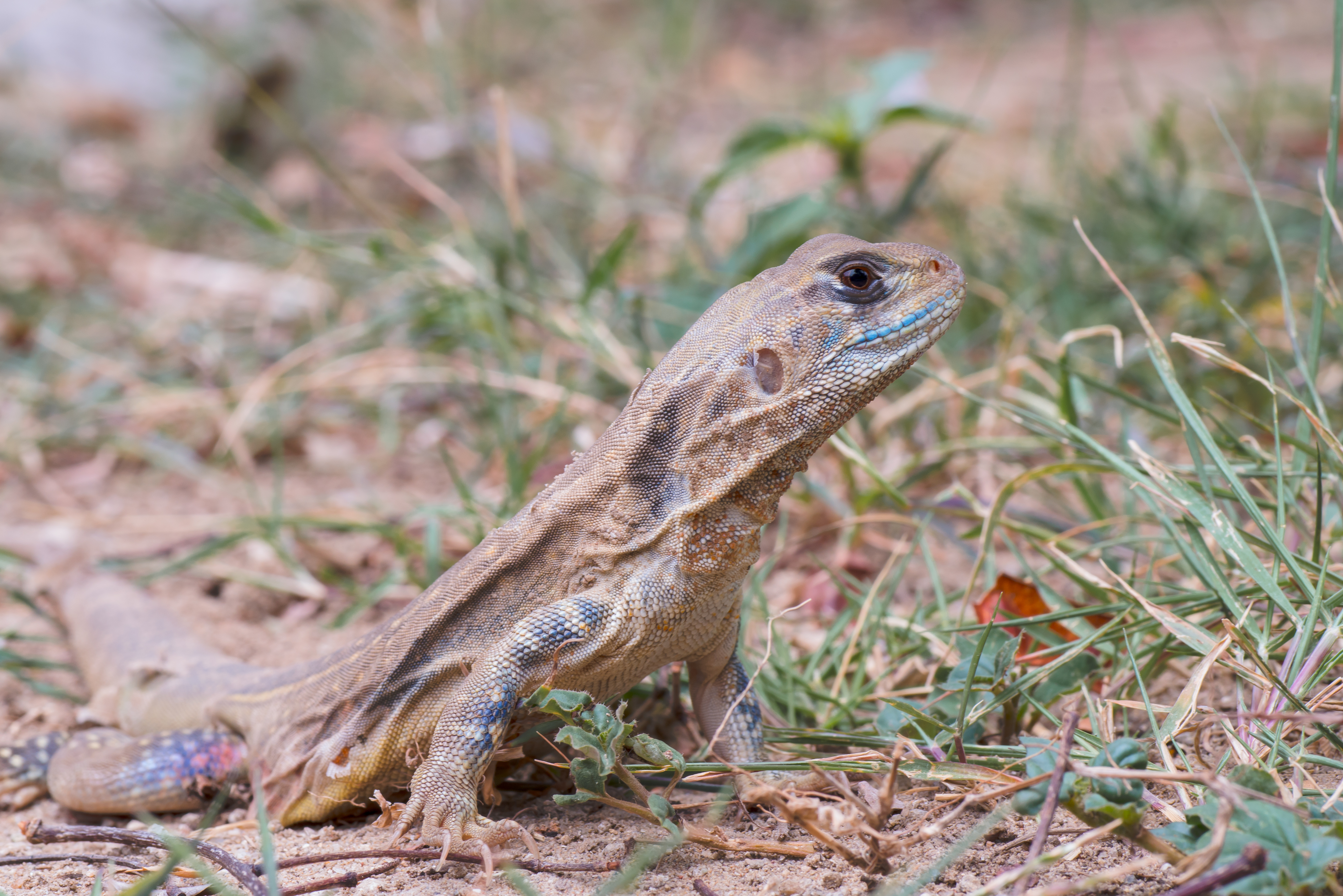

Conservation status
- Least Concern (IUCN 3.1)

Scientific classification
- Kingdom: Animalia
- Phylum: Chordata
- Class: Reptilia
- Order: Squamata
- Suborder: Iguania
- Family: Agamidae
- Genus: Leiolepis
- Species: L. belliana

Binomial name
- Leiolepis belliana (Hardwicke & Gray, 1827)

Synonyms
- Uromastix belliana Hardwicke & Gray, 1827; Leiolepis bellii Gray, 1845; Leiolepis belliana — Boulenger, 1890

= Common butterfly lizard =

Species of lizard

The common butterfly lizard (Leiolepis belliana), also called the butterfly agama or butterfly lizard, is a species of lizard in the family Agamidae. The species is native to Asia.

== Etymology ==
The specific name, belliana, is in honor of English zoologist Thomas Bell.

The common name butterfly lizard is from flaps of skin on their sides which can expand to look like butterfly wings.

== Geographic range ==
L. belliana can be found in Cambodia, Indonesia, Malaysia, Myanmar, Thailand, and Vietnam.

It has been observed as an invasive species in Florida as far back as 1992. It was originally introduced by a tropical fish dealer in the Miami area and populations there continue to spread. The ecological impacts on native Florida species are unknown.

== Description ==
L. belliana has a tan or olive green body and yellow spots on its back, with small orange and black lines on its sides and extendable side flaps. Male lizards will have bright red and black stripes during mating season. Adults can reach 15 inches in length.

== Ecology ==
=== Reproduction ===
L. belliana are strictly monogamous and share their burrow with their partner. Females can lay up to 8 eggs at a time. Babies are cared for in the parent's burrow for a few months before they dig their own burrows nearby.

=== Diet ===
The butterfly lizard feeds primarily on insects including grasshoppers, beetle larvae, and butterflies, though sometimes feeds on plants.

=== Habitat ===
L. belliana prefers open, dry areas and grasslands. It digs and lives in burrows averaging 30 cm (12 in) deep and 70 cm (28 in) long which it protects itself in during the night.

== Gallery ==
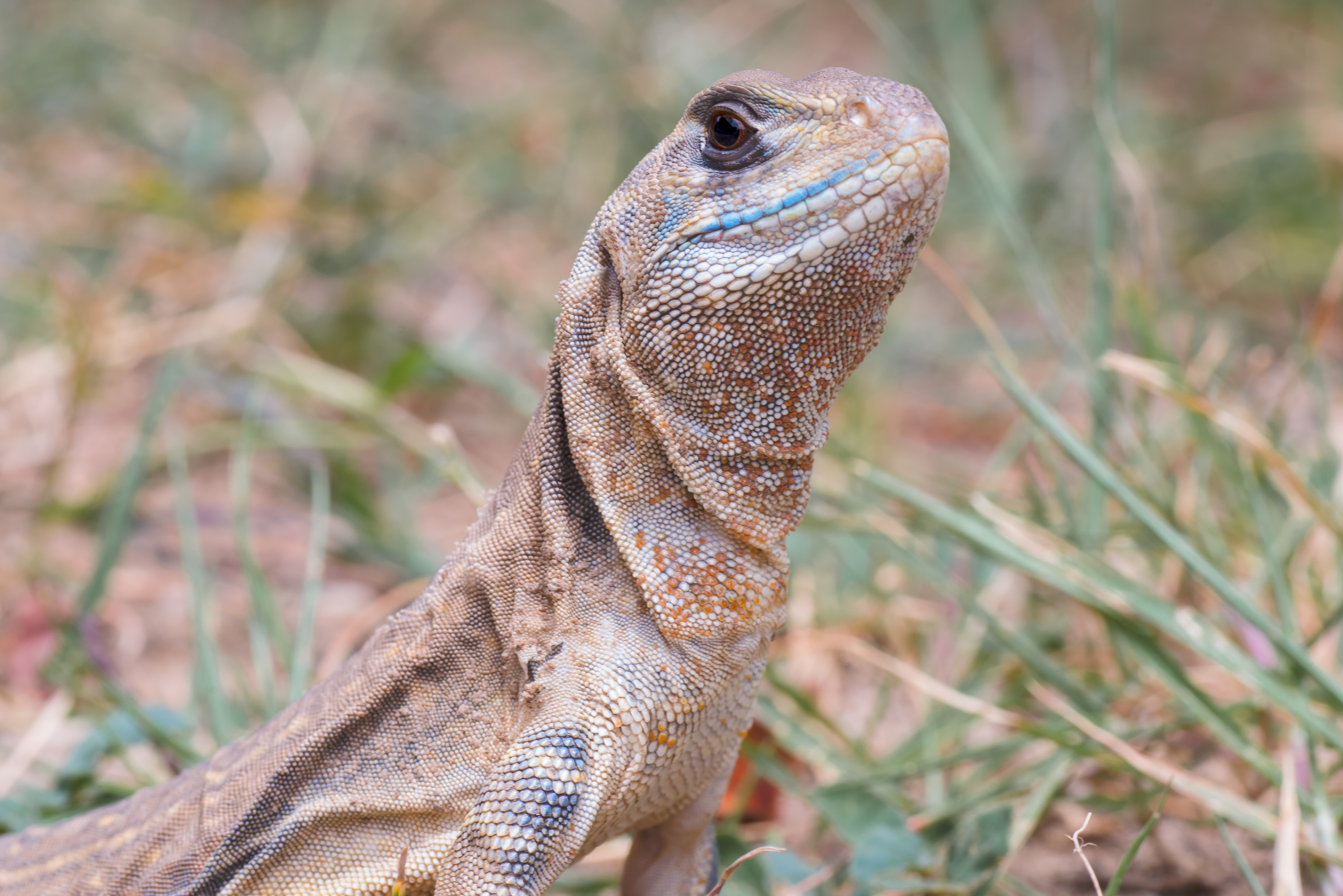

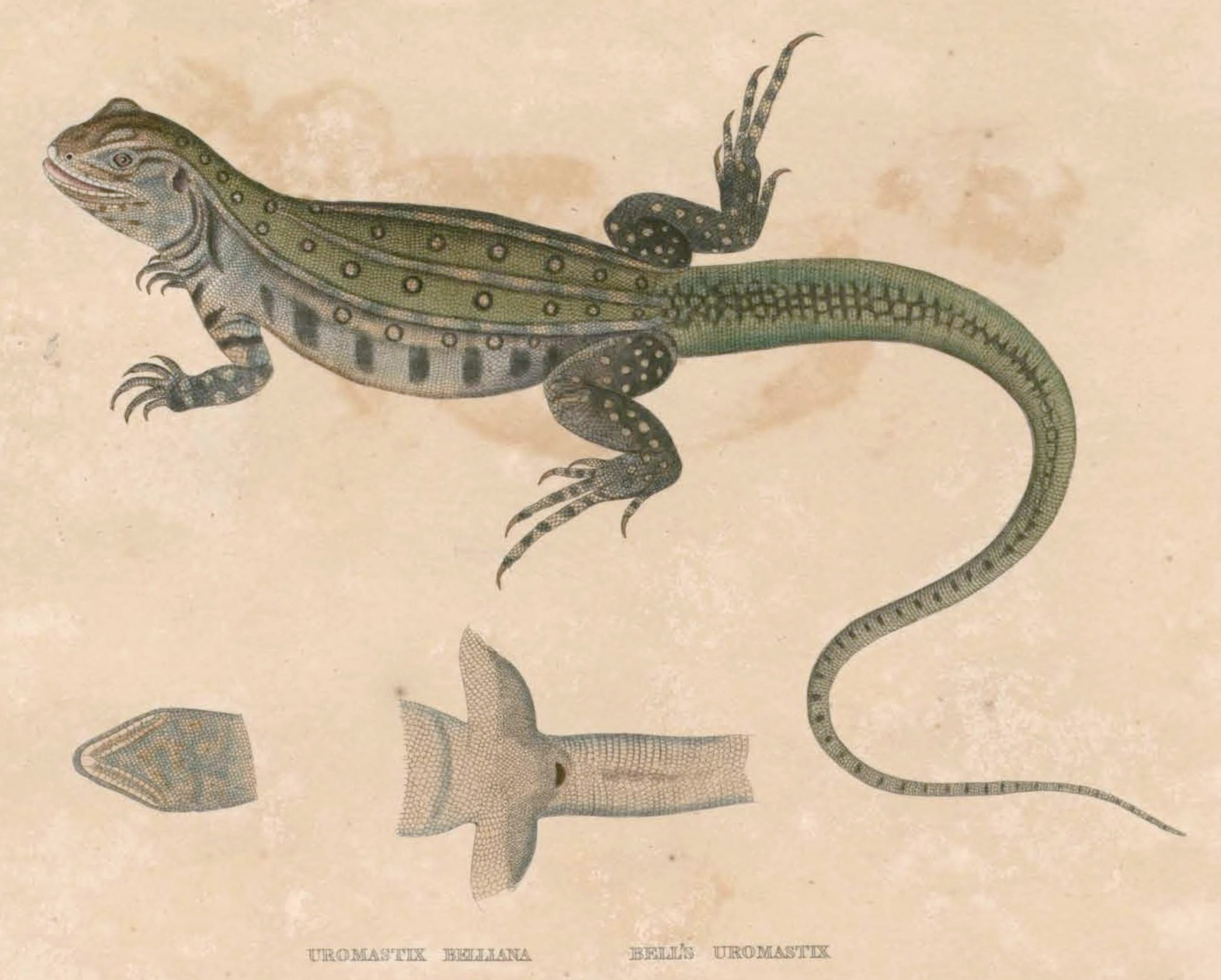
