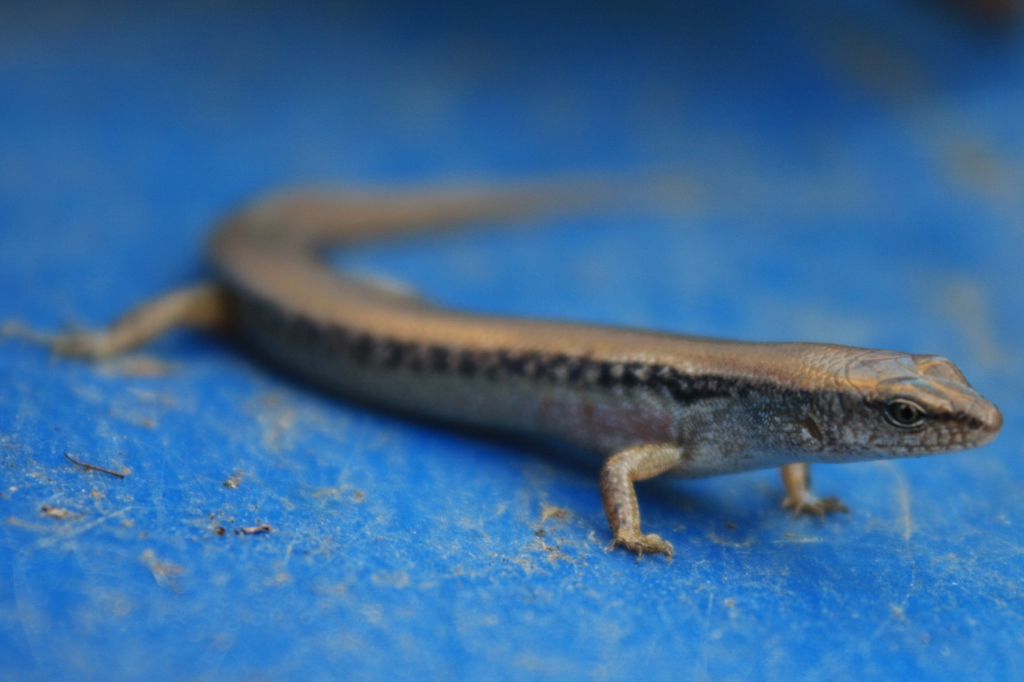

Scientific classification
- Kingdom: Animalia
- Phylum: Chordata
- Class: Reptilia
- Order: Squamata
- Family: Scincidae
- Genus: Scincella
- Species: S. reevesii

Binomial name
- Scincella reevesii (Gray, 1838)

Synonyms
- Tiliqua reevesii Gray, 1838; Eumeces reevesii — Günther, 1864; Lygosoma nigropunctatum Bocourt, 1878; Lygosoma kakhiensis Boulenger, 1887; Leiolopisma eunice Cochran, 1927; Leiolopisma reevesii — Schmidt, 1927; Leiolopisma smithi Cochran, 1941; Scincella reevesii — Mittleman, 1952; Leiolopisma pootipongi Taylor, 1962; Scincella ochracea Greer, 1974; Sphenomorphus reevesii — Das, 1997; Scincella reevesii — Linkem et al., 2011

= Scincella reevesii =

Species of lizard

Scincella reevesii (common name: Reeves's smooth skink) is a species of skink, a lizard in the family Scincidae. The species is endemic to Asia.

== Etymology ==
The specific name, reevesii, is in honor of English naturalist John Reeves.

== Geographic range ==
S. reevesii is found in southern China (Guangxi, Guangdong, Hainan, Hong Kong), Indochina (Thailand, Cambodia, Vietnam) and south to Western Malaysia, Myanmar, India, and Nepal. There is also a questionable record from Korea. Reports from Bangladesh represent Sphenomorphus maculatus.

== Reproduction ==
S. reevesii is ovoviviparous.
