= Leiolepis peguensis =

Conservation status
- Least Concern (IUCN 3.1)

Scientific classification
- Kingdom: Animalia
- Phylum: Chordata
- Class: Reptilia
- Order: Squamata
- Suborder: Iguania
- Family: Agamidae
- Genus: Leiolepis
- Species: L. peguensis

Binomial name
- Leiolepis peguensis Peters, 1971

Species of lizard

Leiolepis peguensis, the Burmese butterfly lizard, is a species of agamid lizard. It is found in Myanmar.
