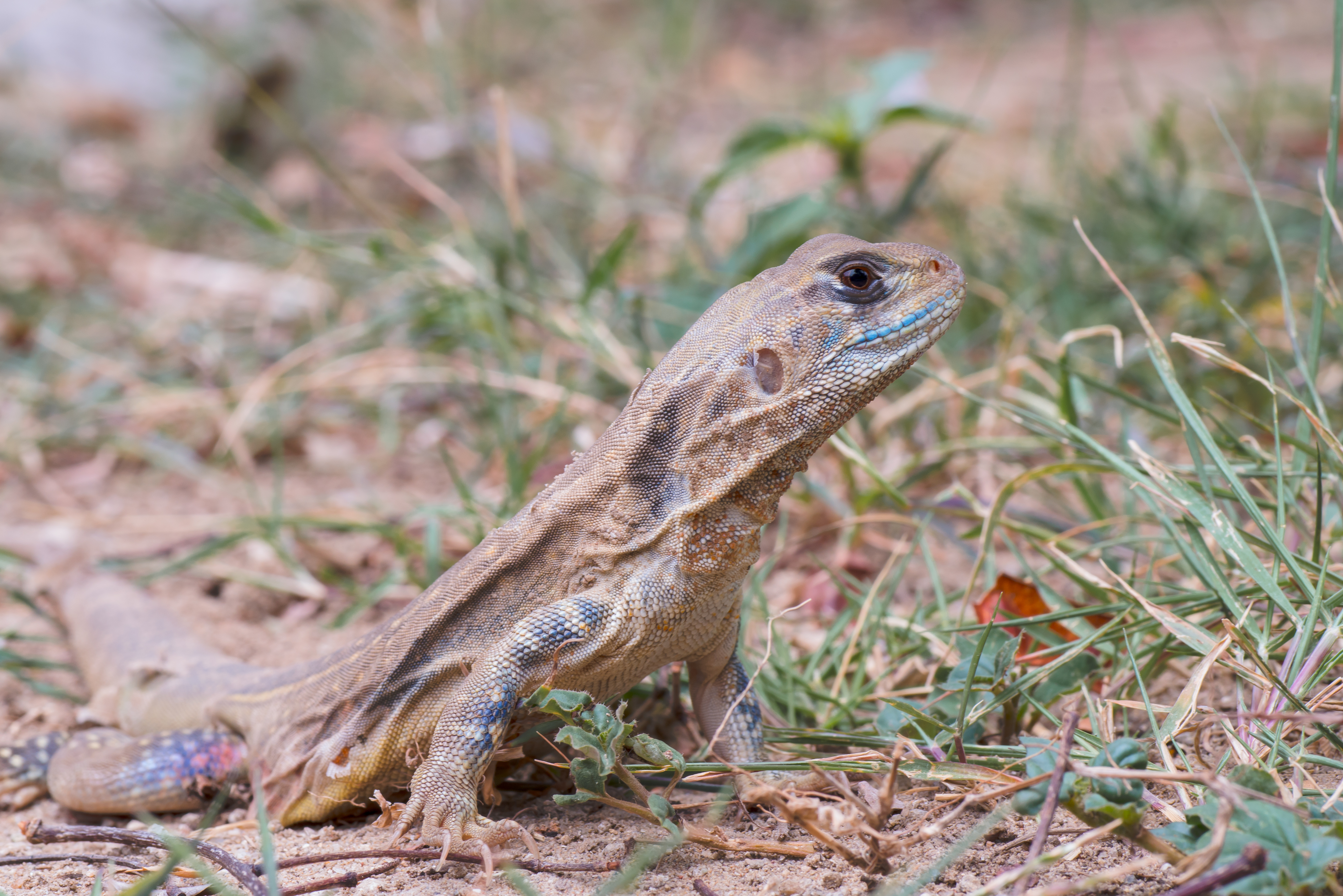
- Common butterfly lizard, L. belliana

Scientific classification
- Kingdom: Animalia
- Phylum: Chordata
- Class: Reptilia
- Order: Squamata
- Suborder: Iguania
- Family: Agamidae
- Subfamily: Leiolepidinae; Fitzinger, 1843
- Genus: Leiolepis; Cuvier, 1829

Species
- 11 spp., see text

= Leiolepis =

Genus of lizards

Leiolepis, commonly known as butterfly lizards or butterfly agamas (Thai: แย้), are group of agamid lizards. They are native to Peninsular Malaysia, Thailand, Myanmar, Laos, Cambodia, Indonesia, Ryukyu Islands (Japan), Vietnam, and Hainan (China). The genus includes both sexual and asexual species. Leiolepis is the sole genus of subfamily Leiolepidinae.

== Description and ecology ==
Leiolepis are moderately sized lizards with the largest snout-to-vent length of 18 cm (7.1 in). Sexual species show sexual dimorphism. They are diurnal and live in flat, open areas with loose soil, which allows them to construct long, interconnected burrows used for refuge. They are omnivorous.

== Species ==
Ten species are recognized as being valid.

- Sexual species:
  - L. belliana (Hardwicke & Gray, 1827) – common butterfly lizard
  - L. guttata Cuvier, 1829 – giant butterfly lizard, spotted butterfly lizard
  - L. ocellata (G. Peters, 1971) – ocellated butterfly lizard
  - L. peguensis G. Peters, 1971 – Burmese butterfly lizard
  - L. reevesii (Gray, 1831) – Chinese butterfly lizard, Reeves's butterfly lizard
  - L. rubritaeniata Mertens, 1961 – Reeves's butterfly lizard
  - L. glaurung Wanchai, Rujirawan, Murdoch, Aksornneam, Promnun, Kaatz, Gregory, Nguyen, Iderstein, Quah, L. L. Grismer, J. L. Grismer & Aowphol, 2024 - Khorat Plateau Butterfly Lizard
- Asexual species:
  - L. boehmei Darevsky & Kupriyanova, 1993 – Böhme's butterfly lizard
  - L. guentherpetersi Darevsky & Kupriyanova, 1993 – Peters's butterfly lizard
  - L. ngovantrii J. Grismer & L. Grismer, 2010 – Ngo Van Tri's lady butterfly lizard
  - L. triploida G. Peters, 1971 – Thai butterfly lizard, Malayan butterfly lizard

Nota bene: A binomial authority in parentheses indicates that the species was originally described in a genus other than Leiolepis.

Asexual species have arisen through hybridization of sexually-reproducing species.

=== Consumption ===
In the northeast region of Thailand it is popular to catch butterfly lizards and eat them. In the South Central Coast region of Vietnam, especially in Ninh Thuan Province, Leiolepis is considered a delicacy for its nutritional value and can fetch high prices on the market.

=== Diet ===
Butterfly Agamas commonly feast on insects (Worms, roaches, crickets, grasshoppers, larvae, beetles, moths) but can also eat fruits (Watermelon, apple, mango, papaya, dates, peaches, apricot) and vegetables (Collard greens, beet greens, mustard greens, broccoli, bell pepper, carrot, green bean). In captivity their meals should be dusted with a vitamin D3 calcium.

== Relationship to humans ==
=== Captivity ===
Butterfly lizards can commonly be found in the pet trade. Not much is known about their breeding or raising their babies so most of the ones found in the pet trade are wild caught.

=== Traditional game ===
In Prachuap Khiri Khan Province, Thailand, there is a traditional game called "yæ̂ lng rū" (แย้ลงรู; literally: "butterfly lizards hole down").
