= Ocellated butterfly lizard =

Conservation status
- Least Concern (IUCN 3.1)

Scientific classification
- Kingdom: Animalia
- Phylum: Chordata
- Class: Reptilia
- Order: Squamata
- Suborder: Iguania
- Family: Agamidae
- Genus: Leiolepis
- Species: L. ocellata

Binomial name
- Leiolepis ocellata Peters, 1971

Species of lizard

Leiolepis ocellata, the ocellated butterfly lizard, is a species of agamid lizard. It is found in Myanmar and Thailand.
