= Russell Train's marble gecko =

Conservation status
- Vulnerable (IUCN 3.1)

Scientific classification
- Kingdom: Animalia
- Phylum: Chordata
- Class: Reptilia
- Order: Squamata
- Suborder: Gekkota
- Family: Gekkonidae
- Genus: Gekko
- Species: G. russelltraini

Binomial name
- Gekko russelltraini Ngo, Bauer, Wood & J. Grismer, 2009

Species of lizard

Russell Train's marble gecko (Gekko russelltraini) is a species of lizard in the family Gekkonidae. The species is endemic to southeastern Vietnam.

== Etymology ==
The specific name, russelltraini, is in honor of American lawyer Russell Errol Train, who was Chairman and Chairman Emeritus of the World Wildlife Fund in the USA.

== Habitat ==
The preferred natural habitats of G. russelltraini are forest and dry caves, at altitudes of 100–500 m (330–1,640 ft).

== Description ==
G. russelltraini is moderate-sized for its genus. Adults have a snout-to-vent length (SVL) of 7–8.3 cm (2.8–3.3 in).
