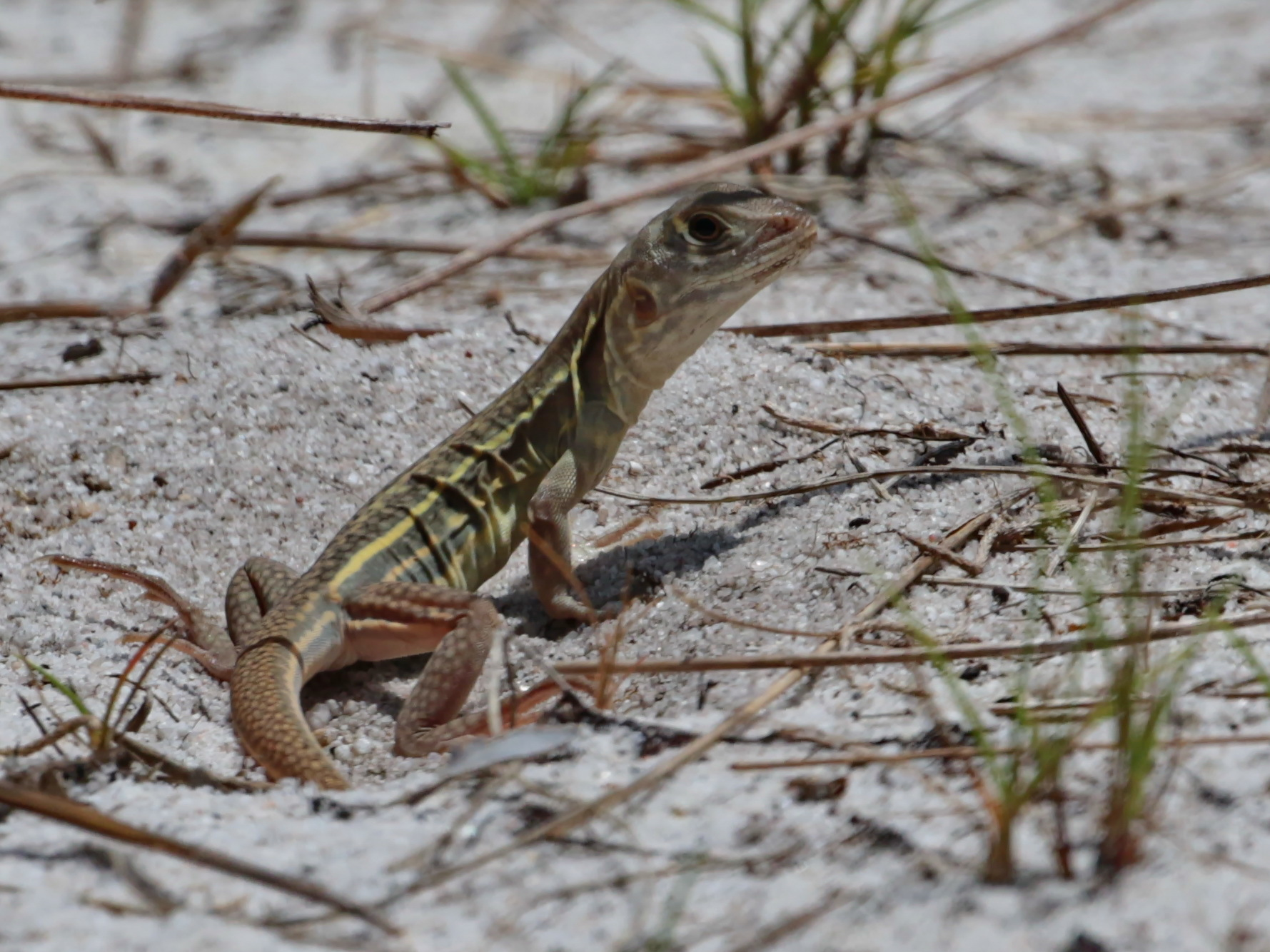

Conservation status
- Vulnerable (IUCN 3.1)

Scientific classification
- Kingdom: Animalia
- Phylum: Chordata
- Class: Reptilia
- Order: Squamata
- Suborder: Iguania
- Family: Agamidae
- Genus: Leiolepis
- Species: L. boehmei

Binomial name
- Leiolepis boehmei Darevsky & Kupriyanova, 1993
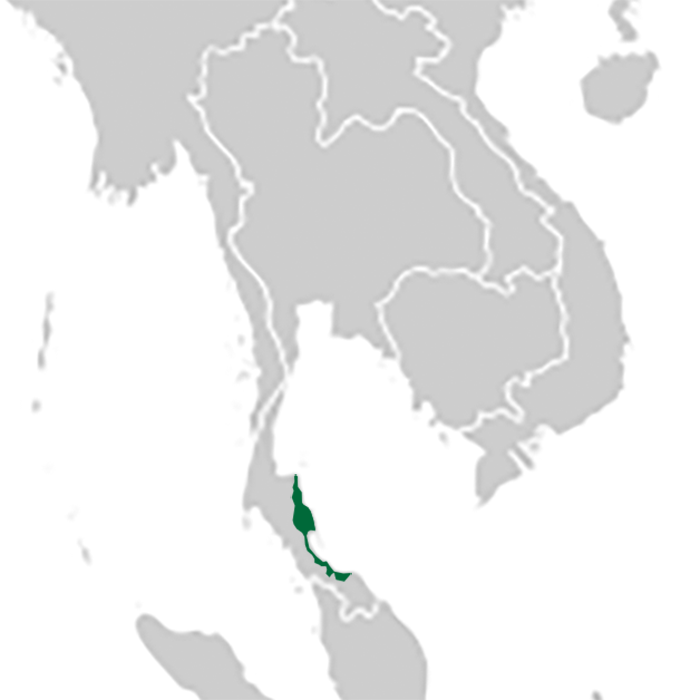

= Leiolepis boehmei =

Species of lizard

Leiolepis boehmei, also known commonly as Böhme's butterfly lizard and Böhmes Schmetterlingsagame in German, is a species of lizard in the family Agamidae. The species is endemic to Thailand.

== Etymology ==
The specific name, boehmei, is in honor of German herpetologist Wolfgang Böhme.

== Geographic range ==
L. boehmei is found in southern Thailand.

== Habitat ==
The preferred natural habitat of L. boehmei is coastal areas with beach forest or sand dunes.

== Description ==
Medium-sized for its genus, L. boehmei may attain a snout-to-vent length (SVL) of 12 cm (4.7 in). The tail is long, slightly more than twice SVL. Dorsally, it is dark olive. Ventrally, it is grayish.

== Behavior ==
L. boehmei is terrestrial and fossorial.

== Reproduction ==
L. boehmi is a unisexual, all female, diploid species, which reproduces by parthenogenesis.
