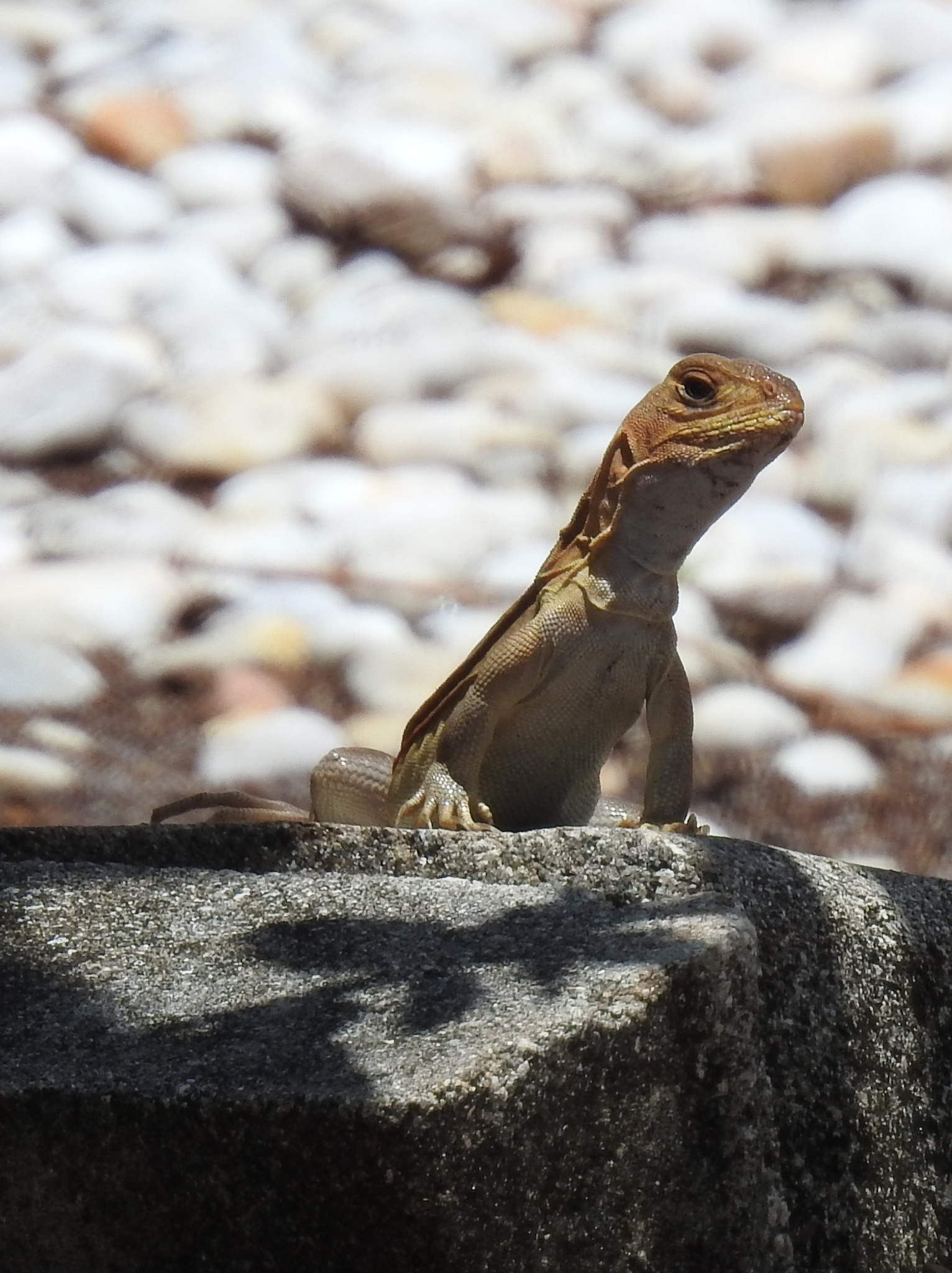

Conservation status
- Least Concern (IUCN 3.1)

Scientific classification
- Kingdom: Animalia
- Phylum: Chordata
- Class: Reptilia
- Order: Squamata
- Suborder: Iguania
- Family: Agamidae
- Genus: Leiolepis
- Species: L. rubritaeniata

Binomial name
- Leiolepis rubritaeniata Mertens, 1961

= Leiolepis rubritaeniata =

Species of lizard

Leiolepis rubritaeniata, Reeves's butterfly lizard or the red-banded butterfly lizard, is a species of agamid native to Thailand, Laos, Cambodia and Vietnam.

== Reproduction ==
L. rubritaeniata is oviparous.
