= Larutia =

Scientific classification
- Domain: Eukaryota
- Kingdom: Animalia
- Phylum: Chordata
- Class: Reptilia
- Order: Squamata
- Family: Scincidae
- Subfamily: Sphenomorphinae
- Genus: Larutia; Bohme, 1981

Genus of lizards

Larutia is a small genus of limbless skinks in the family Scincidae.

== Species ==
- Larutia kecil Fukuyama, Hikida, Hossman, & Nishikawa, 2019
- Larutia larutensis (Boulenger, 1900) – black larut skink, Larut Hills larut skink
- Larutia miodactyla (Boulenger, 1903) – single finger larut skink, Titiwanga larut skink
- Larutia nubisilvicola Chan-ard, Cota, Mekchai & Lhaoteaw, 2011
- Larutia penangensis Grismer et al., 2011 – Penang Island larut skink
- Larutia puehensis Grismer, Leong, & Yaakob, 2003 – Berumput two-toed skink
- Larutia seribuatensis Grismer, Leong, & Yaakob, 2003 – two-lined two-toed skink, Seribuat larut skink
- Larutia sumatrensis Bleeker, 1860
- Larutia trifasciata (Tweedie, 1940) – three-banded larut skink
