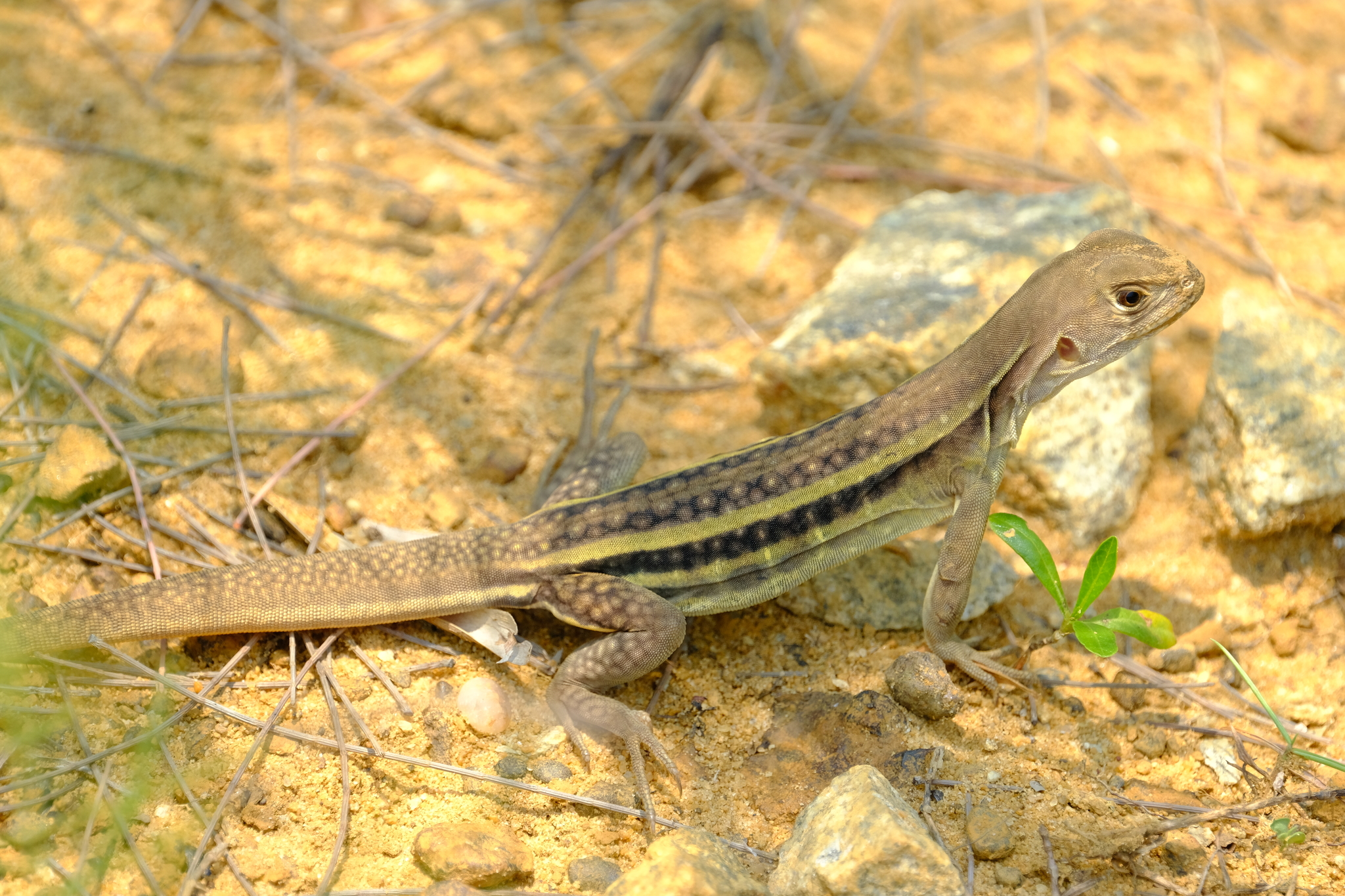
- L. guentherpetersi in Tam Nghĩa, Núi Thành, Vietnam

Conservation status
- Endangered (IUCN 3.1)

Scientific classification
- Kingdom: Animalia
- Phylum: Chordata
- Class: Reptilia
- Order: Squamata
- Suborder: Iguania
- Family: Agamidae
- Genus: Leiolepis
- Species: L. guentherpetersi

Binomial name
- Leiolepis guentherpetersi Darevsky & Kupriyanova, 1993

= Leiolepis guentherpetersi =

Species of lizard

Leiolepis guentherpetersi, also known commonly as Peters' butterfly lizard or Peters's butterfly lizard, is an endangered species of lizard in the subfamily Leiolepidinae of the family Agamidae. The species is endemic to Vietnam.

== Etymology ==
The specific name, guentherpetersi, is in honor of German herpetologist Günther Peters.

== Description ==
Relatively large for its genus, Leiolepis guentherpetersi may attain a snout-to-vent length (SVL) of 15.5 cm (6.1 in).

== Geographic distribution ==
Leiolepis guentherpetersi is found in coastal central Vietnam.

== Habitat ==
The preferred natural habitat of Leiolepis guentherpetersi is sparsely vegetated dunes, at elevations from near sea level to 45 m (148 ft).

== Reproduction ==
Leiolepis guentherpetersi is parthenogenetic and ovoviviparous. Litter size is 1–3 young.
