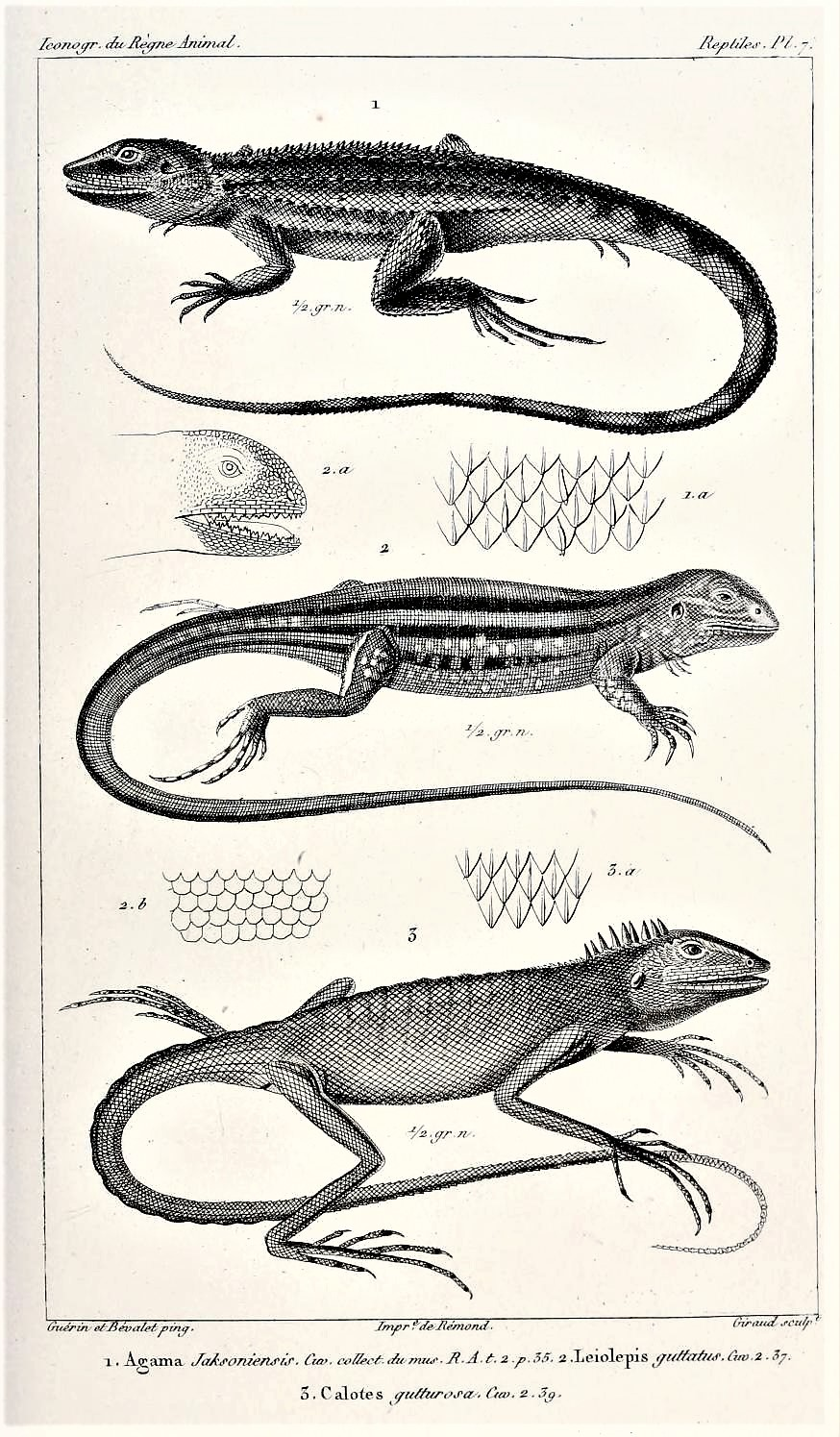

Conservation status
- Data Deficient (IUCN 3.1)

Scientific classification
- Kingdom: Animalia
- Phylum: Chordata
- Class: Reptilia
- Order: Squamata
- Suborder: Iguania
- Family: Agamidae
- Genus: Leiolepis
- Species: L. guttata

Binomial name
- Leiolepis guttata Cuvier, 1829

= Giant butterfly lizard =

Species of lizard

The giant butterfly lizard (Leiolepis guttata) is a rarely seen species of lizard found in parts of Southeast Asia. It is the largest member of the genus Leiolepis.
