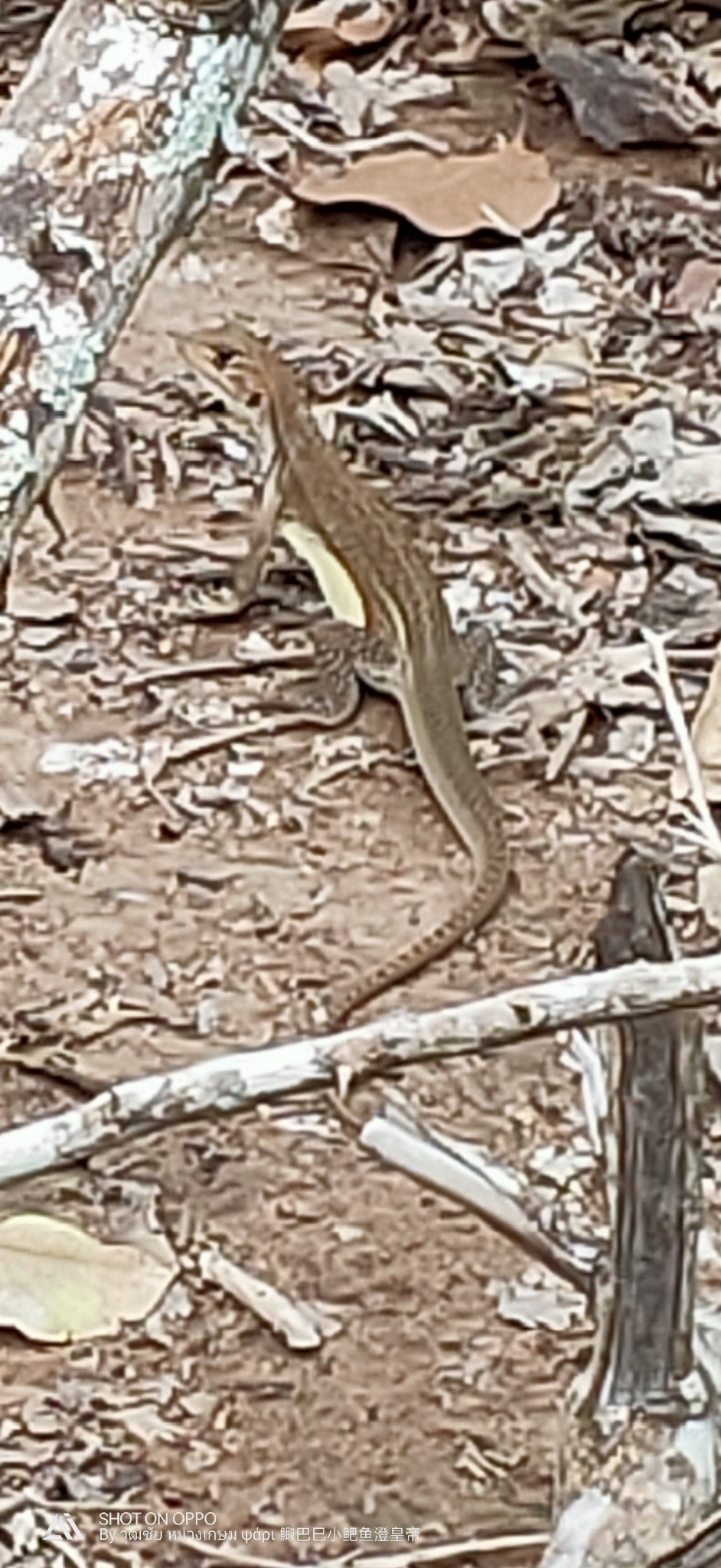

Conservation status
- Least Concern (IUCN 3.1)

Scientific classification
- Kingdom: Animalia
- Phylum: Chordata
- Class: Reptilia
- Order: Squamata
- Suborder: Iguania
- Family: Agamidae
- Genus: Leiolepis
- Species: L. reevesii

Binomial name
- Leiolepis reevesii (Gray, 1831)

Synonyms
- Uromastyx Reveesii Gray, 1831; Leiolepis Reveesii — Gray, 1845; Leiolepis reevesii — Theobald, 1868; Leiolepis belliana reevesii — Mertens, 1961; Leiolepis reevesii — Cox et al., 1998; Leiolepis reevesii — Chan-ard et al., 1999; Leiolepis reevesii — Sang et al., 2009; Leiolepis reevesii — Hartmann et al., 2012

= Leiolepis reevesii =

Reeves' Butterfly Lizard

Species of lizard

Leiolepis reevesii, commonly known as Reeves's butterfly lizard, is a species of lizard in the family Agamidae. The species is endemic to south-eastern Asia.

== Etymology ==
The specific name, reevesii, is in honor of English naturalist John Reeves.

== Geographic range ==
L. reevesii is found in China, Malaysia, Vietnam, Cambodia and Thailand.
