= Jesse Leland Grismer =

American herpetologist (born 1983)

- Born: 9 March 1983 (age 43); California, United States
- Education: Louisiana State University (B.Sc.); Villanova University (M.Sc.); University of Kansas (Ph.D.)
- Known for: Discovery and description of new reptile and amphibian species Research on biogeography and evolution of lizards and snakes
- Scientific career
- Fields: Herpetology
- Workplaces: Auburn University; University of California, Los Angeles
- Thesis: The Fragmentation of Gondwanaland: Influence on the Historical Biogeography and Morphological Evolution within Dragon Lizards (Squamata: Agamidae) (2016)

Jesse Leland Grismer, often written as Jesse L. Grismer, (born 9 March 1983) is an American herpetologist. He is a research associate in the Department of Biological Sciences at Auburn University and at the La Kretz Center for California Conservation Science at the University of California, Los Angeles.

== Biography ==
Grismer is the son of herpetologist Larry Lee Grismer and his wife Marta. In 2007, he earned a Bachelor of Science degree in biological sciences from Louisiana State University. He completed a Master of Science degree in biology at Villanova University in 2010. In August 2016, he received his Ph.D. from the University of Kansas with a dissertation titled The Fragmentation of Gondwanaland: Influence on the Historical Biogeography and Morphological Evolution within Dragon Lizards (Squamata: Agamidae).

His research focuses on the discovery and description of new species in Central Asia and the South Pacific, scale morphology of vipers, boas, and skinks, patterns of distribution and colonization across Pacific archipelagos, the evolution of parthenogenesis in Southeast Asian butterfly lizards, and conservation genetics of herpetofauna in Southern California.

In 2002 and 2003, Grismer worked as a herpetological consultant on two projects for the World Wildlife Fund in Malaysia, conducting surveys in the Cameron Highlands and Genting Highlands in Pahang, the Ulu Muda forest in Kedah, and the Temengor Forest Reserve in Perak.

Together with his father, Grismer has described species in the genera Acanthosaura, Cnemaspis, Cyrtodactylus, Gyiophis, Hemiphyllodactylus, Larutia, Leiolepis, Lygosoma, Pseudocalotes, Trimeresurus and Tytthoscincus. With Aaron M. Bauer, Grismer described the gecko species Gekko russelltraini in 2009.

Grismer is a member of the Society for the Study of Amphibians and Reptiles.

In 2002, Grismer appeared on the National Geographic Television series Snake Wranglers. In 2004, he and his father featured in the Animal Planet documentary Reptile Kings: Search for the Lost Viper.
