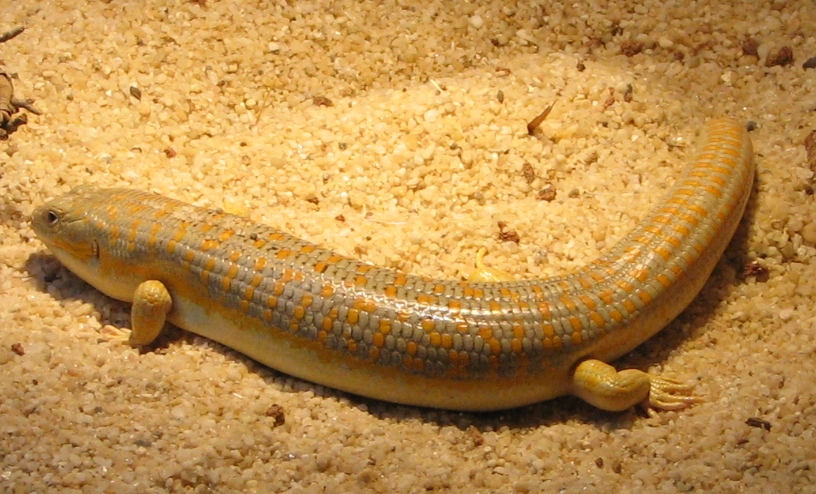
- Eumeces schneiderii

Scientific classification
- Kingdom: Animalia
- Phylum: Chordata
- Class: Reptilia
- Order: Squamata
- Family: Scincidae
- Subfamily: Scincinae
- Genus: Eumeces; Wiegmann, 1834

Synonyms
- Novoeumeces Griffith et al., 2000

= Eumeces =

Genus of lizards

The genus Eumeces (family Scincidae) comprises four African to Middle-Eastern skink species.

== Systematics ==
Recently two taxonomic revisions have been made regarding the 19th century genus Eumeces. They both resulted in similar results; the genus is paraphyletic and must be "sliced up" into several different genera. Griffith et al. (2000) proposed that the type species for Eumeces, E. pavimentatus, which is considered by many to be a subspecies of Eumeces schneiderii, should be changed to Lacerta fasciata, so that the genus name Eumeces would stay with the most species-rich clade. However, this petition has not been verified by the International Commission on Zoological Nomenclature. Schimtz et al. argued that Griffith et al. violated the Code and rejected the proposal on good grounds. Thus only the African species of the Eumeces schneiderii group belong to the genus Eumeces.

Within Eumeces the following species are recognized:

- Eumeces algeriensis – Algerian skink
- Eumeces blythianus – Blyth's skink
- Eumeces cholistanensis
- Eumeces indothalensis – striped mole skink
- Eumeces persicus – Persian striped skink
- Eumeces schneiderii – Schneider's skink
- Eumeces zarudnyi

Some species that were formerly considered Eumeces have now been assigned to new genera:

Now in Plestiodon:

- Plestiodon anthracinus, coal skink
- Plestiodon barbouri, Barbour's skink (Japan)
- Plestiodon brevirostris, short-nosed skink (Mexico)
- Plestiodon callicephalus, North American mountain skink
- Plestiodon capito
- Plestiodon chinensis, Chinese skink (East Asia: China, Korea, Japan)
- Plestiodon colimensis (Mexico)
- Plestiodon copei (Mexico)
- Plestiodon coreensis, Korean big skink (Korea)
- Plestiodon dugesii (Mexico) - rare
- Plestiodon egregius, mole skink
- Plestiodon elegans, elegant skink, five-striped blue-tailed skink (juvenile), or Shanghai skink (East Asia)
- Plestiodon fasciatus, common five-lined skink
- Plestiodon gilberti, Gilbert's skink (North America)
- Plestiodon inexpectatus, southeastern five-lined skink
- Plestiodon kishinouyei, Kishinoue's giant skink
- Plestiodon lagunensis, San Lucan skink
- Plestiodon laticeps, broad-headed skink
- Plestiodon latiscutatus, Okada's Five-lined Skink (Japan)
- Plestiodon liui (Asia)
- Plestiodon longirostris, Bermuda rock skink
- Plestiodon lynxe, oak forest skink (Mexico)
- Plestiodon marginatus, Ryūkyū five-lined skink (Okinawa and Amami Islands)
- Plestiodon multilineatus
- Plestiodon multivirgatus, many-lined skink
  - Plestiodon (multivirgatus) gaigeae, variable skink (North America) - sometimes Eumeces (multivirgatus) epipleurotus
- Plestiodon obsoletus, Great Plains skink
- Plestiodon ochoterenae
- Plestiodon okadae, Okada's five-lined skink (Japan)
- Plestiodon parviauriculatus, northern pygmy skink (Mexico)
- Plestiodon parvulus, southern pygmy skink (Mexico)
- Plestiodon popei (Asia)
- Plestiodon quadrilineatus, four-lined Asian skink
- Plestiodon septentrionalis, prairie skink - includes Eumeces obtusirostris
- Plestiodon skiltonianus, western skink
- Plestiodon stimpsonii, Yaeyama seven-lined skink (Japan)
- Plestiodon sumichrasti (Mexico)
- Plestiodon tamdaoensis
- Plestiodon tetragrammus, four-lined skink
- Plestiodon tunganus

Now in Eurylepis:

- Eumeces indothalensis - now Eurylepis indothalensis
- Eumeces poonaensis - now Eurylepis poonaensis
- Eumeces taeniolatus - now Eurylepis taeniolata

Now in Mesoscincus:

- Eumeces altamirani - now Mesoscincus altamirani
- Eumeces managuae - now Mesoscincus managuae
- Eumeces schwartzei - now Mesoscincus schwartzei
