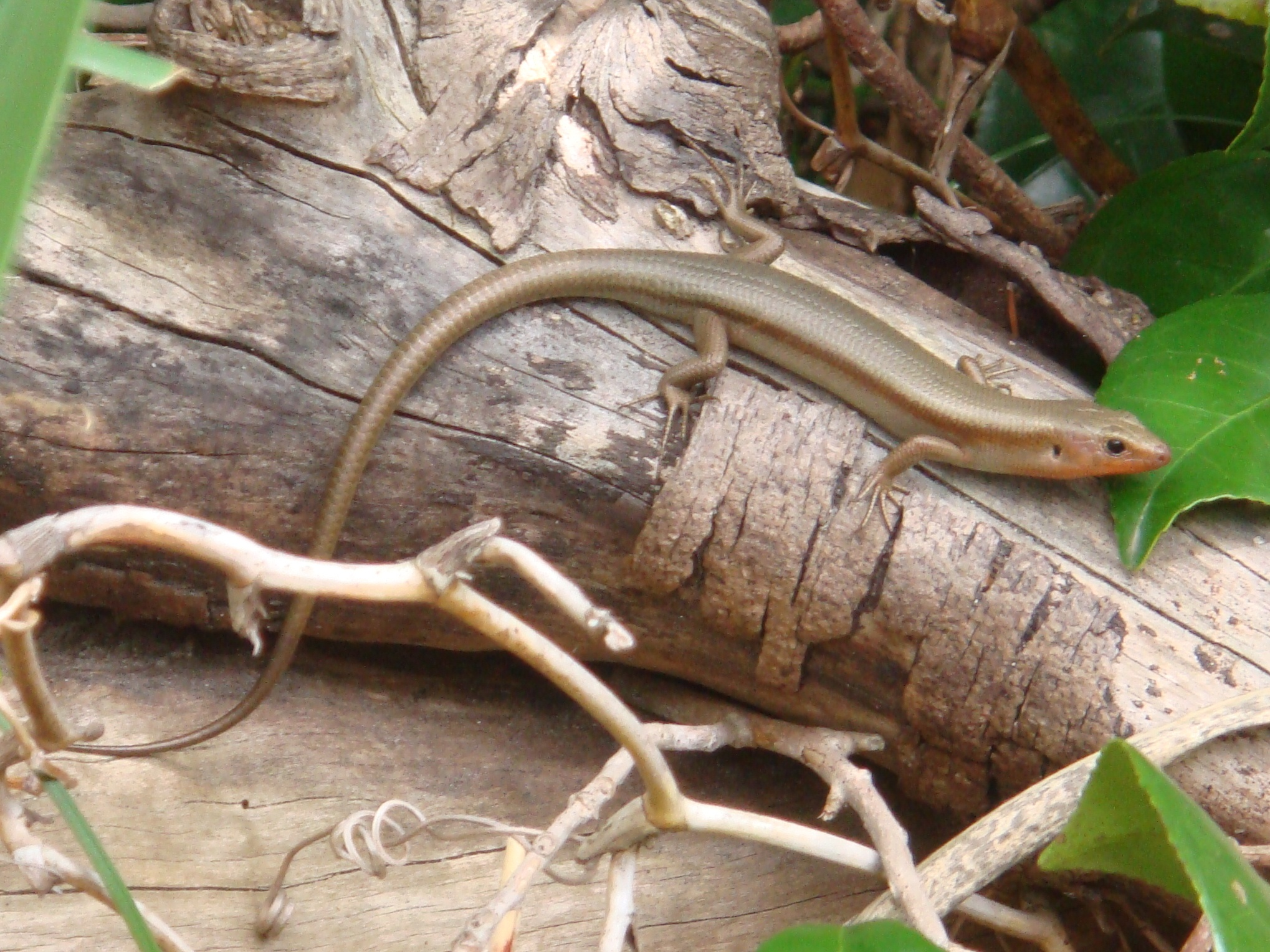
- Adult Plestiodon latiscutatus on Shikine-jima, northern Izu Islands

Conservation status
- Least Concern (IUCN 3.1)

Scientific classification
- Kingdom: Animalia
- Phylum: Chordata
- Class: Reptilia
- Order: Squamata
- Family: Scincidae
- Genus: Plestiodon
- Species: P. latiscutatus

Binomial name
- Plestiodon latiscutatus Hallowell, 1861
- Range of P. latiscutatus.

Synonyms
- Eumeces latiscutatus — Stejneger, 1907; Eumeces latiscutatus okadae Stejneger, 1907 (fide Motokawa & Hikida, 2003); Eumeces latiscutatus — Taylor, 1936; Eumeces okadae — Taylor, 1936; Eumeces okadae — Hikida, 1979; Eumeces latiscutatus — Bauer et al., 1995; Eumeces latiscutatus — Griffith, Ngo & Murphy, 2000; Eumeces okadae — Griffith, Ngo & Murphy, 2000; Eumeces latiscutatus — Szcerbak, 2003; Plestiodon latiscutatus — Schmitz et al., 2004; Plestiodon okadae — Schmitz et al., 2004; Eumeces latiscutatus — Goris & Maeda, 2004; Plestiodon latiscutatus — Okamoto & Hikida, 2012

= Plestiodon latiscutatus =

Species of reptile

Plestiodon latiscutatus, also known commonly as the Far Eastern skink, Okada's five-lined skink, and Okada-Tokage (オカダトカゲ) in Japanese, is a species of lizard in the subfamily Scincinae of the family Scincidae. The species is endemic to Japan.

== Taxonomy ==
The species Plestiodon latiscutatus was first described by the American herpetologist Edward Hallowell in 1861. There are no recognized subspecies. During the 20th century it was placed in the genus Eumeces, which as of 2026 contains African and Middle-Eastern skinks. It was long called Eumeces okadae, a synonym of P. latiscutatus according to the rules of nomenclature and priority.

== Description ==
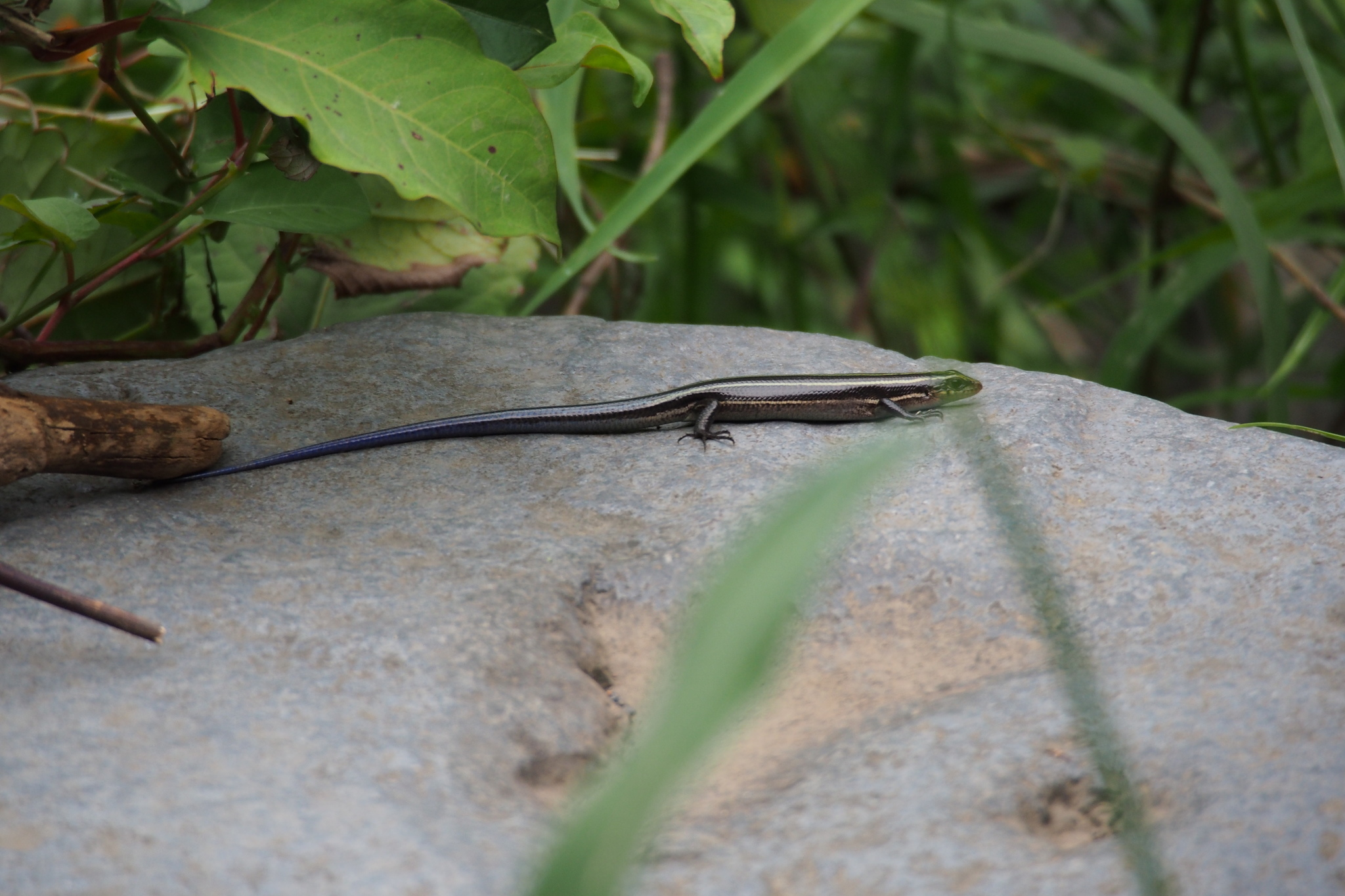
Younger P. latiscutatus in northern Izu Peninsula with still bluish tail and striped pattern

The total length (tail included) of Plestiodon latiscutatus is 15–24 cm (5.9–9.4 in), and the snout-to-vent length (SVL) is 6–9 cm (2.4–3.5 in). Similar species are P. japonicus and P. finitimus. The color of P. latiscutatus is more greenish than that of P. japonicus. Juveniles have a blue tail which is also more greenish than that of P. japonicus, and the striped pattern of P. latiscutatus disappears sooner. On the outer Izu islands P. latiscutatus usually has more rows of body scales than P. japonicus. Overall the two species are best distinguished by their geographic ranges.

== Behavior ==
Plestiodon latiscutatus preys on earthworms, spiders, ants, Amphipoda, and other invertebrates. The mating season is in spring, from mid-April to late May. Females lay clutches of four to twelve eggs every two years. The size of the clutches varies from island to island with a higher number of eggs per clutch on islands with low population densities of the species. The female cares for the eggs until they hatch as in all Japanese species of Plestiodon. While remaining with the eggs, the female rolls them about in the nest. Experiments in which the female was instead removed from their nests showed that the eggs usually didn't survive.

== Geographic range and threats ==
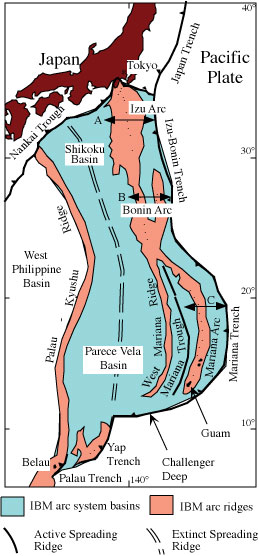
Izu–Bonin–Mariana Arc with the Izu Peninsula in the North

It is found on the Izu Islands and the Izu Peninsula. The IUCN lists the species as least concern. However, some subpopulations on the Izu islands Miyake-jima, Hachijō-jima and Aogashima have been in decline due to the introduction of Japanese weasels as a predator species in order to control rats. There is also hybridization on Hachijō-jima with introduced P. japonicus. On the Japanese Red List the species is therefore listed as species with Locally endangered Population on these three islands. The majority population on the Izu Peninsula is considered as stable.

The ranges of two Plestiodon species border P. latiscutatus: P. japonicus is found in southwestern Honshū with the exception of the Izu Peninsula and on Shikoku and Kyushu as well as surrounding islands. On the Izu Islands P. japonicus is only found on Hachijō-jima, where it was introduced. P. finitimus is dirstributed north to P. latiscutatus on Honshū and Hokkaido. The species border runs in the northwest of the Izu Peninsula along the lower Fuji River which is located southwest of Fuji-san. On the northeastern side of Izu Peninsula and southeast of Fuji-san it runs along Sakawa River. This coincides with a former sea that is assumed to have separated the Izu Peninsula which is located on the Philippine Sea Plate from the rest of modern-day Honshū until the mid-Pleistocene. Similar biogeographic borders exist for the woodlouse species Ligia oceanica and for land-snails. The three Plestiodon species only overlap in a small range and show clear differences in mitochondrial DNA sequence.

Other species of the genus found in Japan are distributed on the Nansei Islands:

- P. barbouri on Amami Islands and Okinawa Islands
- P. elegans on Senkaku Islands and Taiwan, Southeast-China and North-Vietnam
- P. kishinouyei on Miyako and Yaeyama Islands
- P. kuchinoshimensis auf Kuchinoshima in the northern Tokara Islands
- P. marginatus on Okinawa, Amami and Tokara Islands
- P. oshimensis on Amami and Tokara Islands
- P. stimpsonii on Yaeyama Islands
- P. takarai on four of the Senkaku Islands
