= Ousima skink =

There are two species of skink named Ousima skink:

- Plestiodon marginatus
- Plestiodon oshimensis
