= Far Eastern skink =

There are two species of skink named Far Eastern skink:

- Plestiodon latiscutatus, endemic to Japan
- Plestiodon finitimus, endemic to Japan and Russia
