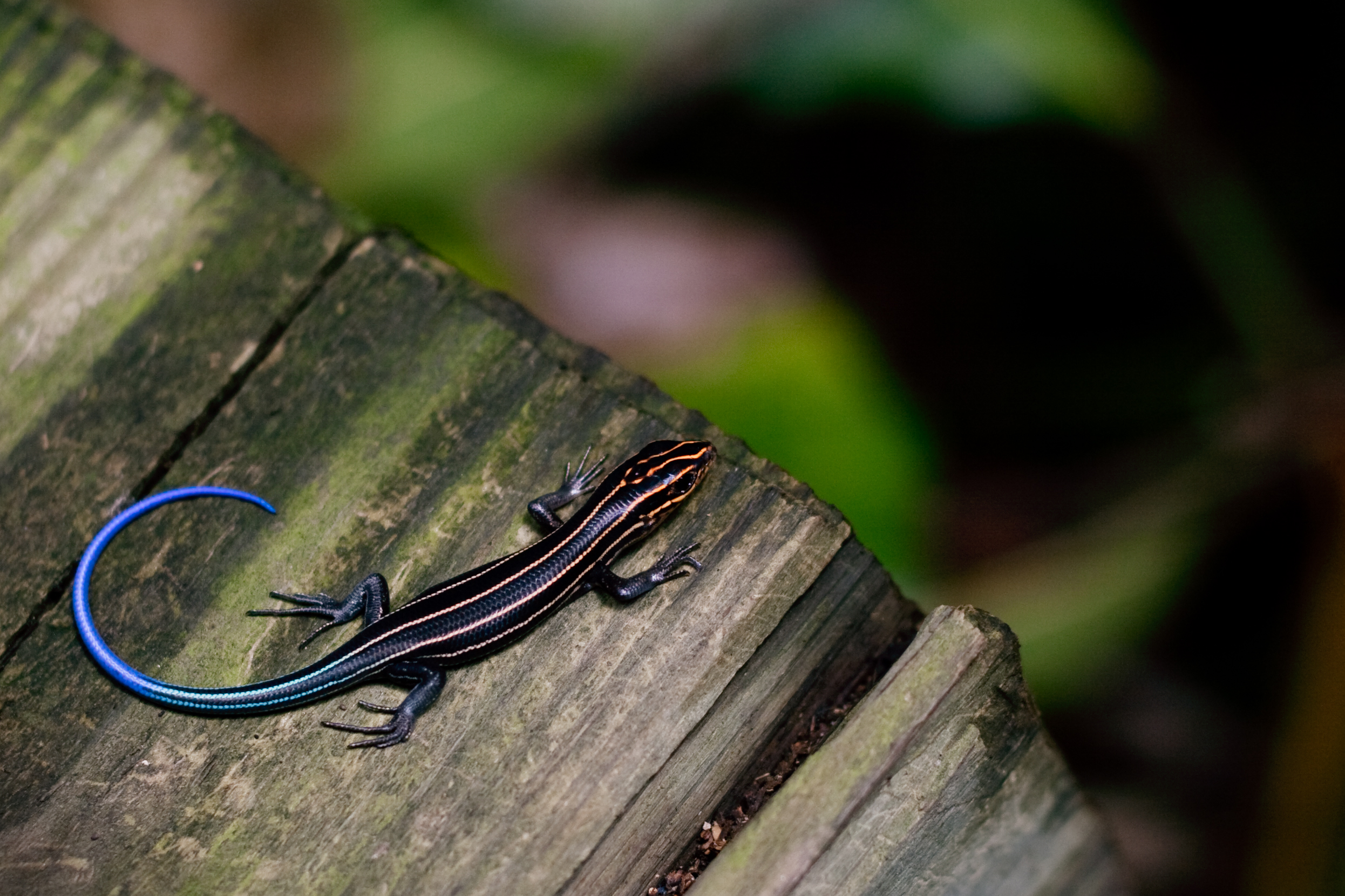
- Plestiodon fasciatus

Scientific classification
- Kingdom: Animalia
- Phylum: Chordata
- Class: Reptilia
- Order: Squamata
- Family: Scincidae
- Subfamily: Scincinae
- Genus: Plestiodon; A.M.C. Duméril & Bibron, 1839

= Plestiodon =

Genus of lizards

Plestiodon is a genus of lizards in the family Scincidae (skinks). The genus contains many species formerly classified under the genus Eumeces, except those now placed in Mesoscincus. They are secretive, agile animals with a cylindrical body covered with smooth, shiny scales. They are distributed from East Asia to throughout North America from southern Canada south to Mexico, including oceanic islands such as Bermuda.

== Defensive mechanism ==
The conspicuous coloring of species of Plestiodon is a survival trait: it attracts a predator's attention to the tail of the animal, which will break off when grabbed. A skink thus often manages to escape and hide under some rock, log, or fallen leaves while the predator still contemplates the wildly thrashing severed tail. (This is an instance of what is called autotomy: voluntarily shedding a body part in order to escape, and later regenerating the body part.) After the tail regenerates, it usually has the same color as the rest of the body and is typically shorter than the original tail. In some species, regrown tails are pinkish. A regrown tail has a cartilaginous rod for support instead of vertebrae.

== Reproduction ==
Plestiodon are all oviparous. The female lays eggs once a year after the breeding season in spring. The clutch size varies and is typically around 5 to 10 eggs. The hatchlings appear in late summer.

== Thermoregulation ==
Like other reptiles, Plestiodon skinks are "cold-blooded" — they are ectothermic animals: their metabolism cannot regulate their body temperature. To warm up, they often bask in the sun. In colder climates, they hibernate in winter in burrows below the frost line. In hot climates, they are active mainly in the morning and evening, staying under cover during the hottest hours of the day to avoid overheating.

== Systematics ==
Recently two taxonomic revisions have been made regarding the 19th century genus Eumeces. They both resulted in similar results; the genus is paraphyletic and must be "sliced up" into several different genera. Griffith et al. (2000) proposed that the type species for Eumeces, E. pavimentatus, which is considered by many to be a subspecies of Eumeces schneiderii, should be changed to Lacerta fasciata, so that the genus name Eumeces would stay with the most species-rich clade. However this petition has not been verified by the International Commission on Zoological Nomenclature. Schmitz et al. argued that Griffith et al. violated the Code and rejected the proposal on good grounds. Thus only the African species of the Eumeces schneiderii group still belong to the genus Eumeces.

Species that are now in Plestiodon:

- Plestiodon anthracinus Baird, 1849 – coal skink
- Plestiodon barbouri (Van Denburgh, 1912) – Barbour's eyelid skink
- Plestiodon bilineatus (W. Tanner), 1958 – two-lined short-nosed skink
- Plestiodon brevirostris (Günther, 1860) – short-nosed skink
- Plestiodon callicephalus (Bocourt, 1879) – mountain skink
- Plestiodon capito (Bocourt, 1879) – Gail's eyelid skink
- Plestiodon chinensis (Gray, 1838) – Chinese blue-tailed skink
- Plestiodon colimensis (Taylor, 1935) – Colima skink
- Plestiodon copei (Taylor, 1933) – Cope's skink
- Plestiodon coreensis (Doi & Kamita, 1937) – Smith's skink
- Plestiodon dicei (Ruthven & Gaige, 1933) – Dice's short-nosed skink
- Plestiodon dugesii (Thominot, 1883) – Dugès's skink
- Plestiodon egregius Baird, 1858 – mole skink
- Plestiodon elegans (Boulenger, 1887) – five-striped blue-tailed skink, Shanghai elegant skink
- Plestiodon fasciatus (Linnaeus, 1758) – five-lined skink
- Plestiodon finitimus Okamoto & Hikida, 2012 – Far Eastern skink
- Plestiodon gilberti (Van Denburgh, 1896) – Gilbert's skink
- Plestiodon indubitus (Taylor, 1933) – Mexican short-nosed skink
- Plestiodon inexpectatus (Taylor, 1932) – southeastern five-lined skink
- Plestiodon japonicus (W. Peters, 1864)
- Plestiodon kishinouyei (Stejneger, 1901) – Kishinouye's giant skink
- Plestiodon kuchinoshimensis Kurita & Hikida, 2014
- Plestiodon lagunensis (Van Denburgh, 1895) – San Lucan skink
- Plestiodon laticeps (Schneider, 1801) – broad-headed skink
- Plestiodon latiscutatus Hallowell, 1861 – Far Eastern skink, Japanese five-lined skink
- Plestiodon leucostictus (Hikida, 1988) – Chinese blue-tailed skink
- Plestiodon liui (Hikida & Zhao, 1989)
- Plestiodon longiartus García-Vázquez, Pavón-Vázquez, Feria-Ortiz & Nieto-Montes de Oca, 2021
- Plestiodon longirostris Cope, 1861 – Bermuda skink, longnose skink, or the rock lizard
- Plestiodon lotus Pavón-Vázquez et al., 2017
- Plestiodon lynxe (Wiegmann, 1834) – oak forest skink
- Plestiodon marginatus Hallowell, 1861 – Okinawa blue-tailed skink, Ousima skink
- Plestiodon multilineatus (W. Tanner, 1957) – Chihuahuan skink
- Plestiodon multivirgatus Hallowell, 1857 – many-lined skink
- Plestiodon nietoi Feria-Ortiz & García-Vázquez, 2012
- Plestiodon obsoletus Baird & Girard, 1852 – Great Plains skink
- Plestiodon ochoterenae (Taylor, 1933) – Guerreran skink
- Plestiodon oshimensis (Thompson, 1912) – Ousima skink
- Plestiodon parviauriculatus (Taylor, 1933) – northern pygmy skink
- Plestiodon parvulus (Taylor, 1933) – southern pygmy skink
- Plestiodon popei (Hikida, 1989) – Pope's skink
- Plestiodon quadrilineatus Blyth, 1853 – four-striped skink, Hong Kong skink
- Plestiodon reynoldsi (Stejneger, 1910) – Florida sand skink
- Plestiodon septentrionalis Baird, 1858 – prairie skink
- Plestiodon skiltonianus Baird & Girard, 1852 – western skink
- Plestiodon stimpsonii (Thompson, 1912) – Stimpson's skink
- Plestiodon sumichrasti (Cope, 1867) – Sumichrast's skink
- Plestiodon takarai Kurita, Ota & Hikida, 2017 – Senkaku skink
- Plestiodon tamdaoensis (Bourret, 1937) – Vietnam skink
- Plestiodon tetragrammus Baird, 1859 – four-lined skink
- Plestiodon tunganus (Stejneger, 1924)

Nota bene: A binomial authority in parentheses indicates that the species was originally described in a genus other than Plestiodon.

Species that are now in Eurylepis:

- Eumeces poonaensis – now Eurylepis poonaensis
- Eumeces taeniolatus – now Eurylepis taeniolata

Species that are now in Mesoscincus:

- Eumeces altamirani – now Mesoscincus altamirani
- Eumeces managuae – now Mesoscincus managuae
- Eumeces schwartzei – now Mesoscincus schwartzei

=== Plestiodon brevirostris group ===
The Plestiodon brevirostris group consists of 14 species.

- Plestiodon bilineatus, Plestiodon copei, Plestiodon dicei, Plestiodon dugesii, Plestiodon indubitus, Plestiodon lynxe, and Plestiodon parviauriculatus – highlands of the central Mexican Plateau, Sierra Madre Occidental, Sierra Madre Oriental, and Trans-Mexican Volcanic Belt
- Plestiodon lotus – Balsas Basin
- Plestiodon colimensis and Plestiodon parvulus – Pacific lowlands from northwestern Michoacán to Sonora
- Plestiodon sumichrasti – the Atlantic versant from central Veracruz south and east through northern Guatemala and Belize to Honduras
- Plestiodon brevirostris – Sierra Madre del Sur
- Plestiodon nietoi and Plestiodon ochoterenae – Sierra Madre del Sur, in south-central Guerrero and from central Guerrero to western Oaxaca
