= Plestiodon indubitus =

Scientific classification
- Domain: Eukaryota
- Kingdom: Animalia
- Phylum: Chordata
- Class: Reptilia
- Order: Squamata
- Family: Scincidae
- Genus: Plestiodon
- Species: P. indubitus

Binomial name
- Plestiodon indubitus (Taylor, 1933)

Synonyms
- Eumeces indubitus Taylor, 1933; Eumeces brevirostris indubitus — Dixon, 1969; Plestiodon brevirostris indubitus — Liner, 2007; Plestiodon indubitus — Feria-Ortiz, et al. 2011

Species of reptile

Plestiodon indubitus, the Mexican short-nosed skink, is a species of skink. It is endemic to Mexico and is known from the states of Guerrero, Morelos, Michoacán, and Jalisco. However, its relationships with other species formerly considered subspecies of Plestiodon brevirostris are not fully resolved.
