= Plestiodon nietoi =

Scientific classification
- Domain: Eukaryota
- Kingdom: Animalia
- Phylum: Chordata
- Class: Reptilia
- Order: Squamata
- Family: Scincidae
- Genus: Plestiodon
- Species: P. nietoi

Binomial name
- Plestiodon nietoi Feria-Ortiz & Garcia-Vázquez, 2012

Species of reptile

Plestiodon nietoi is a species of skink. It is endemic to the Sierra Madre del Sur in Guerrero, Mexico.

Plestiodon nietoi can grow to 77 mm (3.0 in) in snout–vent length.
