= Plestiodon lotus =

Scientific classification
- Kingdom: Animalia
- Phylum: Chordata
- Class: Reptilia
- Order: Squamata
- Family: Scincidae
- Genus: Plestiodon
- Species: P. lotus

Binomial name
- Plestiodon lotus Pavón-Vázquez, Nieto-Montes de Oca, Mendoza-Hernández, Centenero-Alcalá, Santa Cruz-Padilla, & Jiménez-Arcos, 2017

Species of reptile

Plestiodon lotus is a species of skink. It is endemic to the Balsas River basin, Mexico.

Plestiodon lotus occurs in oak and tropical deciduous forests, where it can be found under rocks or fallen logs, but sometimes active on leaf litter.
