= Eumeces cholistanensis =

Scientific classification
- Domain: Eukaryota
- Kingdom: Animalia
- Phylum: Chordata
- Class: Reptilia
- Order: Squamata
- Family: Scincidae
- Genus: Eumeces
- Species: E. cholistanensis

Binomial name
- Eumeces cholistanensis Masroor, 2009

Species of lizard

Eumeces cholistanensis is a species of skink endemic to Pakistan.
