= Eumeces blythianus =

Conservation status
- Least Concern (IUCN 3.1)

Scientific classification
- Kingdom: Animalia
- Phylum: Chordata
- Class: Reptilia
- Order: Squamata
- Family: Scincidae
- Genus: Eumeces
- Species: E. blythianus

Binomial name
- Eumeces blythianus (Anderson, 1871)

Synonyms
- Mabouia blythiana Anderson, 1871; Eumeces blythianus — Boulenger, 1887; Novoeumeces blythianus — Griffith et al., 2000; Eumeces schneideri blythianus — Schmitz et al., 2004

Species of lizard

Eumeces blythianus, commonly known as Blyth's skink, is a species of lizard in the family Scincidae. The species is native to South Asia.

== Etymology ==
The specific name, blythianus, is in honor of English zoologist Edward Blyth (1810–1873), Curator of the Museum of the Asiatic Society of Bengal.

== Geographic range ==
E. blythianus is found in Afghanistan, India (Punjab), and Pakistan.

== Reproduction ==
The mode of reproduction of E. blythianus is unknown.
