= Eumeces zarudnyi =

Scientific classification
- Domain: Eukaryota
- Kingdom: Animalia
- Phylum: Chordata
- Class: Reptilia
- Order: Squamata
- Family: Scincidae
- Genus: Eumeces
- Species: E. zarudnyi

Binomial name
- Eumeces zarudnyi (Nikolsky, 1900)

Species of lizard

Eumeces zarudnyi is a species of skink found in Iran, Afghanistan, and Pakistan.

== Etymology ==
The specific name, zarudnyi, is in honor of Russian zoologist Nikolai Zarudny.
