= Eumeces indothalensis =

Scientific classification
- Kingdom: Animalia
- Phylum: Chordata
- Class: Reptilia
- Order: Squamata
- Family: Scincidae
- Genus: Eumeces
- Species: E. indothalensis

Binomial name
- Eumeces indothalensis Khan & Khan, 1997

Species of lizard

The striped mole skink (Eumeces indothalensis) is a species of skink endemic to Pakistan.
