= Plestiodon bilineatus =

Scientific classification
- Domain: Eukaryota
- Kingdom: Animalia
- Phylum: Chordata
- Class: Reptilia
- Order: Squamata
- Family: Scincidae
- Genus: Plestiodon
- Species: P. bilineatus

Binomial name
- Plestiodon bilineatus (Tanner, 1958)

Species of reptile

Plestiodon bilineatus, also known as the Mexican shortnose skink, or the two-lined short-nosed skink, is a species of lizard endemic to Mexico.

== Description ==
P. bilineatus can reach a snout-to-vent length (SVL) of 71 mm. Light stripes run down from its head to tail.

== Reproduction ==
P. bilineatus is viviparous, with a litter size of 2–7 neonates.

== Habitat ==
The Mexican short-nose skink is endemic to the Pacific Coast and Sierra Madre Occidental pine-oak forests in Durango, Mexico.
