= Eumeces persicus =

Scientific classification
- Kingdom: Animalia
- Phylum: Chordata
- Class: Reptilia
- Order: Squamata
- Family: Scincidae
- Genus: Eumeces
- Species: E. persicus

Binomial name
- Eumeces persicus Faizi, Rastegar-Pouyani, Rastegar-Pouyani, Nazarov, Heidari, Zangi, Orlova, & Poyarkov, 2017

Species of lizard

The Persian striped skink (Eumeces persicus) is a species of skink endemic to Iran.
