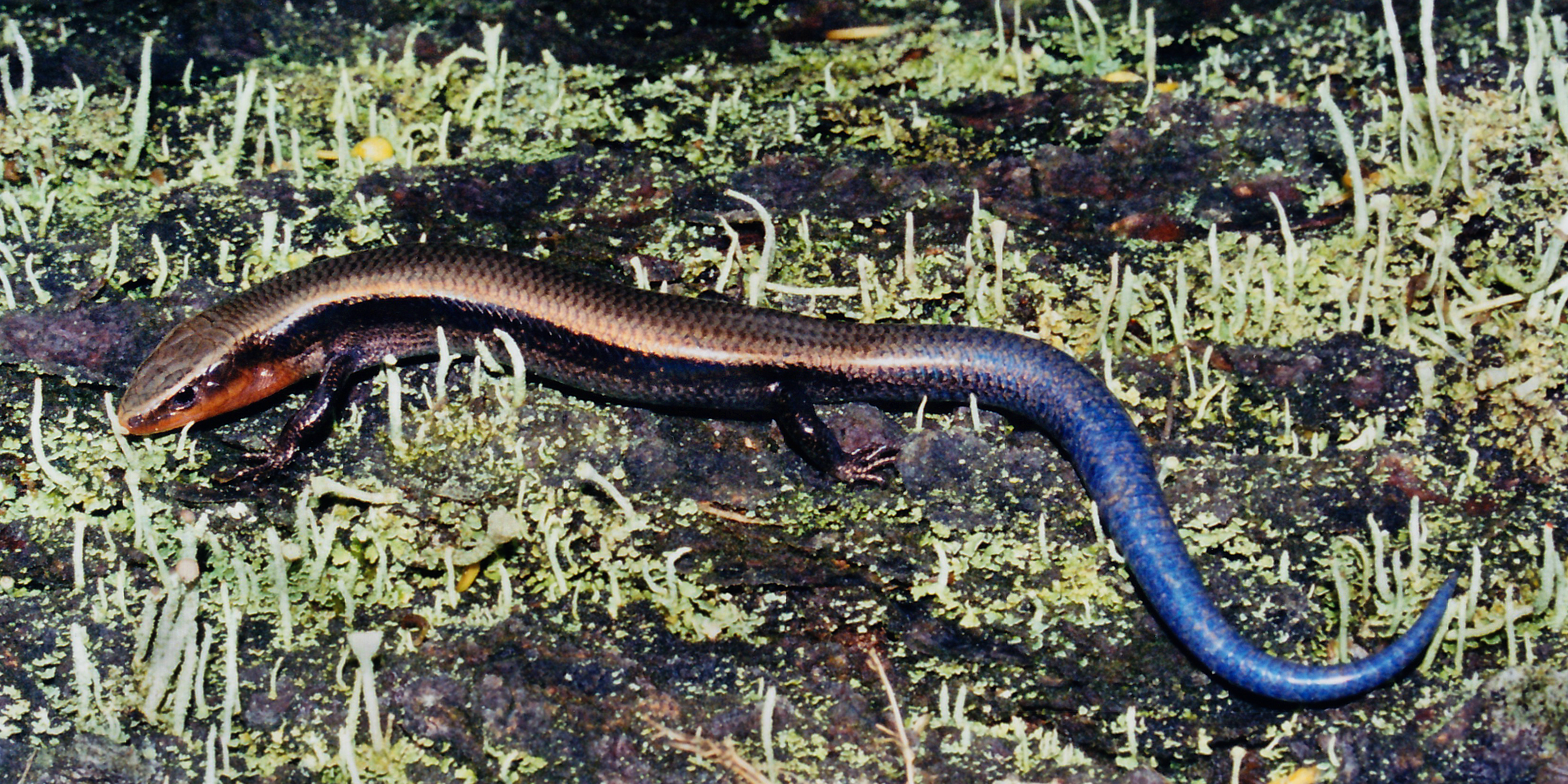

Scientific classification
- Domain: Eukaryota
- Kingdom: Animalia
- Phylum: Chordata
- Class: Reptilia
- Order: Squamata
- Family: Scincidae
- Genus: Plestiodon
- Species: P. dicei

Binomial name
- Plestiodon dicei (Ruthven & Gaige, 1933)

= Plestiodon dicei =

Species of reptile

Plestiodon dicei, or Dice's short-nosed skink, is a species of lizard which is endemic to Mexico. It was named in honor of Lee R. Dice, who collected the holotype in 1930 while conducting a faunal survey in the Sierra de San Carlos, Tamaulipas, Mexico. It was considered a subspecies of Plestiodon brevirostris for many decades. Plestiodon dicei occurs in northeastern Mexico, in the Sierra Madre Oriental in Coahuila, Nuevo Leon, San Luis Potosi, and Tamaulipas, with isolated populations in the Sierra de San Carlos and the Sierra de Tamaulipas.
