= Sceloporus dugesii =

Conservation status
- Least Concern (IUCN 3.1)

Scientific classification
- Kingdom: Animalia
- Phylum: Chordata
- Class: Reptilia
- Order: Squamata
- Suborder: Iguania
- Family: Phrynosomatidae
- Genus: Sceloporus
- Species: S. dugesii

Binomial name
- Sceloporus dugesii Bocourt, 1874

Species of lizard

Sceloporus dugesii, also known commonly as Dugès' spiny lizard and la lagartija espinosa de Dugès del este in Mexican Spanish, is a species of lizard in the family Phrynosomatidae. The species is endemic to Mexico.

== Etymology ==
The specific name, dugesii, is in honor of French-born Mexican naturalist Alfredo Dugès, who is considered to be the "father" of Mexican herpetology.

== Geographic range ==
S. dugesii is found in western Mexico, in the Mexican States of Colima, Guanajuato, Jalisco, Michoacán, and Nayarit.

== Habitat ==
The preferred natural habitat of S. dugesii is rocky areas in forest and shrubland.

== Behavior ==
S. dugesii is terrestrial and saxicolous (rock-dwelling).

== Reproduction ==
S. dugesii is ovoviviparous.
