= Plestiodon capito =

Conservation status
- Least Concern (IUCN 3.1)

Scientific classification
- Kingdom: Animalia
- Phylum: Chordata
- Class: Reptilia
- Order: Squamata
- Suborder: Scinciformata
- Infraorder: Scincomorpha
- Family: Scincidae
- Genus: Plestiodon
- Species: P. capito

Binomial name
- Plestiodon capito (Bocourt, 1879)

Species of lizard

Plestiodon capito, commonly known as Gail's eyelid skink, is a species of lizard, a member of the Plestiodon skinks, and endemic to China.
