= Plestiodon tamdaoensis =

Conservation status
- Least Concern (IUCN 3.1)

Scientific classification
- Kingdom: Animalia
- Phylum: Chordata
- Class: Reptilia
- Order: Squamata
- Suborder: Scinciformata
- Infraorder: Scincomorpha
- Family: Scincidae
- Genus: Plestiodon
- Species: P. tamdaoensis

Binomial name
- Plestiodon tamdaoensis (Bourret, 1937)

Species of reptile

Plestiodon tamdaoensis, the Vietnam skink, is a species of lizard which is found in Vietnam and China.
