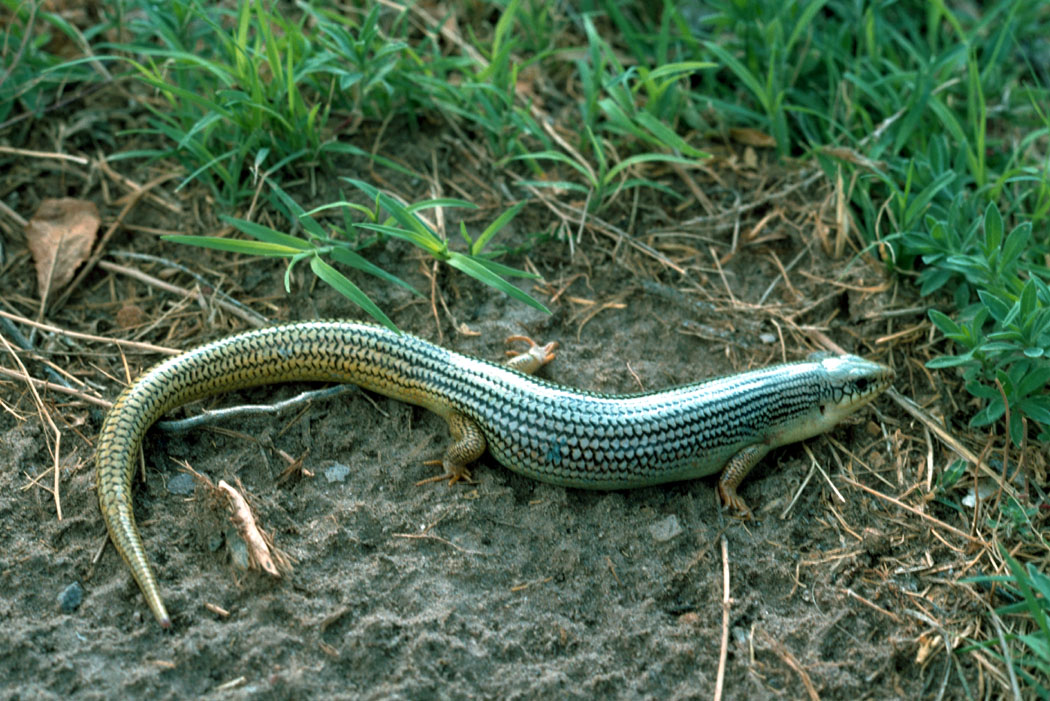

Conservation status
- Least Concern (IUCN 3.1)

Scientific classification
- Kingdom: Animalia
- Phylum: Chordata
- Class: Reptilia
- Order: Squamata
- Family: Scincidae
- Genus: Plestiodon
- Species: P. obsoletus

Binomial name
- Plestiodon obsoletus Baird & Girard, 1852
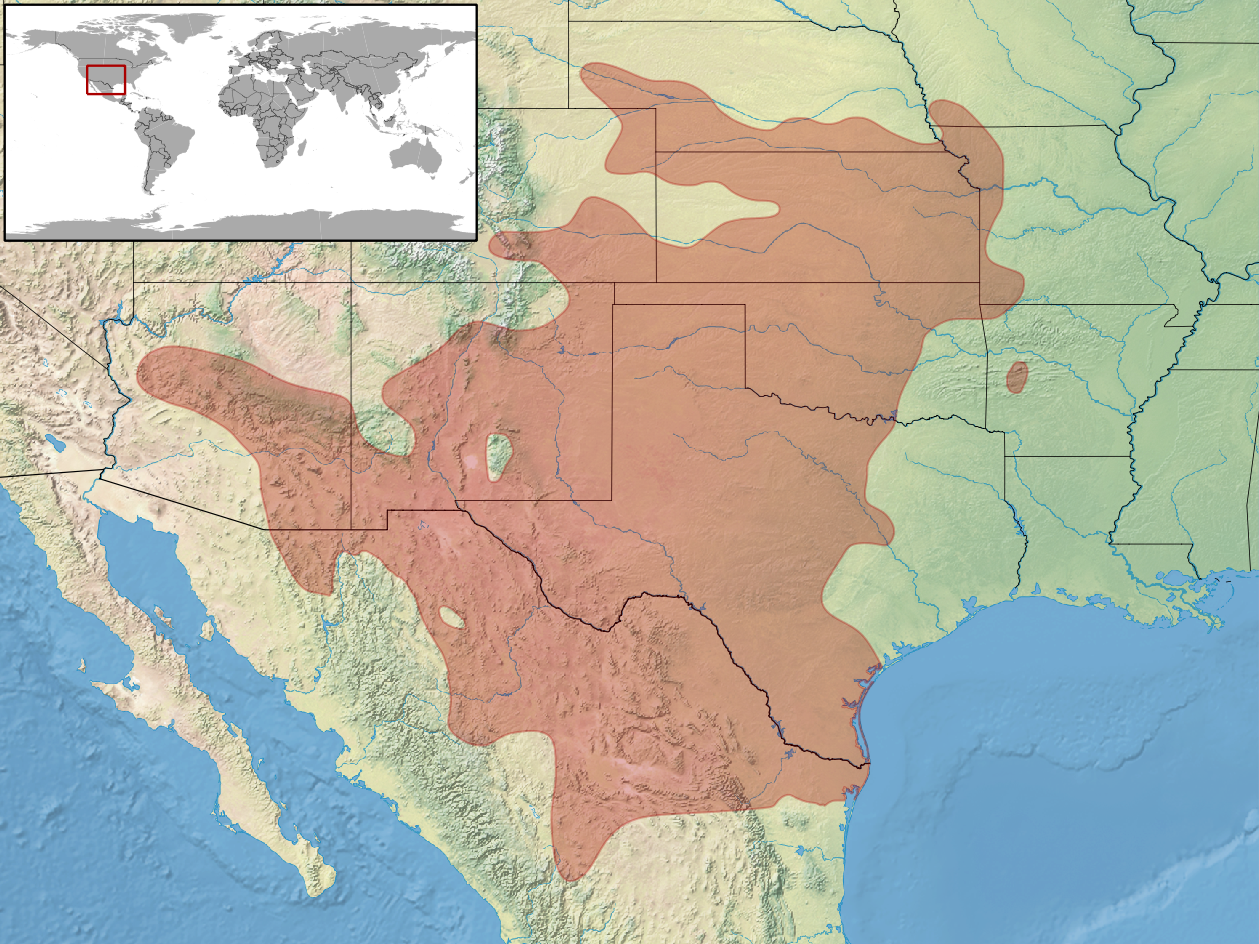

Synonyms
- Plestiodon obsoletum Baird & Girard, 1852; Eumeces obsoletus — Cope, 1875

= Great Plains skink =

Species of lizard

The Great Plains skink (Plestiodon obsoletus) is a species of lizard endemic to North America.

== Description ==
The Great Plains skink, together with the broad-headed skink, is the largest skink of the genus Plestiodon. It reaches a length of 9 to 13 cm from snout to vent (SVL) or up to nearly 34 cm total length (including the tail).

This lizard is light gray or beige in color; its dorsal scales have black or dark brown edges. The scales on the sides run diagonally. The belly is yellow. Juveniles are black with white spots on the lips and the head and have a blue or bluish tail.

== Geographic range ==
The Great Plains skink is very common on the Great Plains, ranging from southeastern Wyoming and Nebraska (and also Fremont County, Iowa) southward to eastern Arizona, New Mexico, Texas, and into Mexico.

== Habitat ==
This skink lives in open plains habitat or the eastern foothills of the Rocky Mountains, in areas near water, e.g. irrigation ditches. In southeastern Colorado, it occurs in elevation up to about 1900 m (7200 ft); in northern Colorado, only at elevations below about 1400 m (4500 ft).

== Reproduction ==
The mating season of the Great Plains skink is in April or May. The female lays between 5 and 32 eggs (on the average about 12) in early summer, which she guards until they hatch in late summer.
