= Plestiodon liui =

Conservation status
- Data Deficient (IUCN 3.1)

Scientific classification
- Kingdom: Animalia
- Phylum: Chordata
- Class: Reptilia
- Order: Squamata
- Family: Scincidae
- Genus: Plestiodon
- Species: P. liui

Binomial name
- Plestiodon liui (Hikida & Zhao, 1989)

Synonyms
- Eumeces liui Hikida & Zhao, 1989

Species of reptile

Plestiodon liui is a species of lizard in the subfamily Scincinae of the family Scincidae (skinks). The species is endemic to China.

== Etymology ==
The specific name, liui, is in honor of Chinese herpetologist Ch'eng-chao Liu.

== Geographic range ==
P. liui is found south of the Yangtze River in the Chinese provinces of Hubei, Jiangsu, and Zhejiang.

== Habitat ==
The preferred natural habitat of P. liui is unknown.

== Reproduction ==
The mode of reproduction of P. liui is unknown.
