= Plestiodon multilineatus =

Conservation status
- Data Deficient (IUCN 3.1)

Scientific classification
- Kingdom: Animalia
- Phylum: Chordata
- Class: Reptilia
- Order: Squamata
- Suborder: Scinciformata
- Infraorder: Scincomorpha
- Family: Scincidae
- Genus: Plestiodon
- Species: P. multilineatus

Binomial name
- Plestiodon multilineatus (Tanner, 1957)
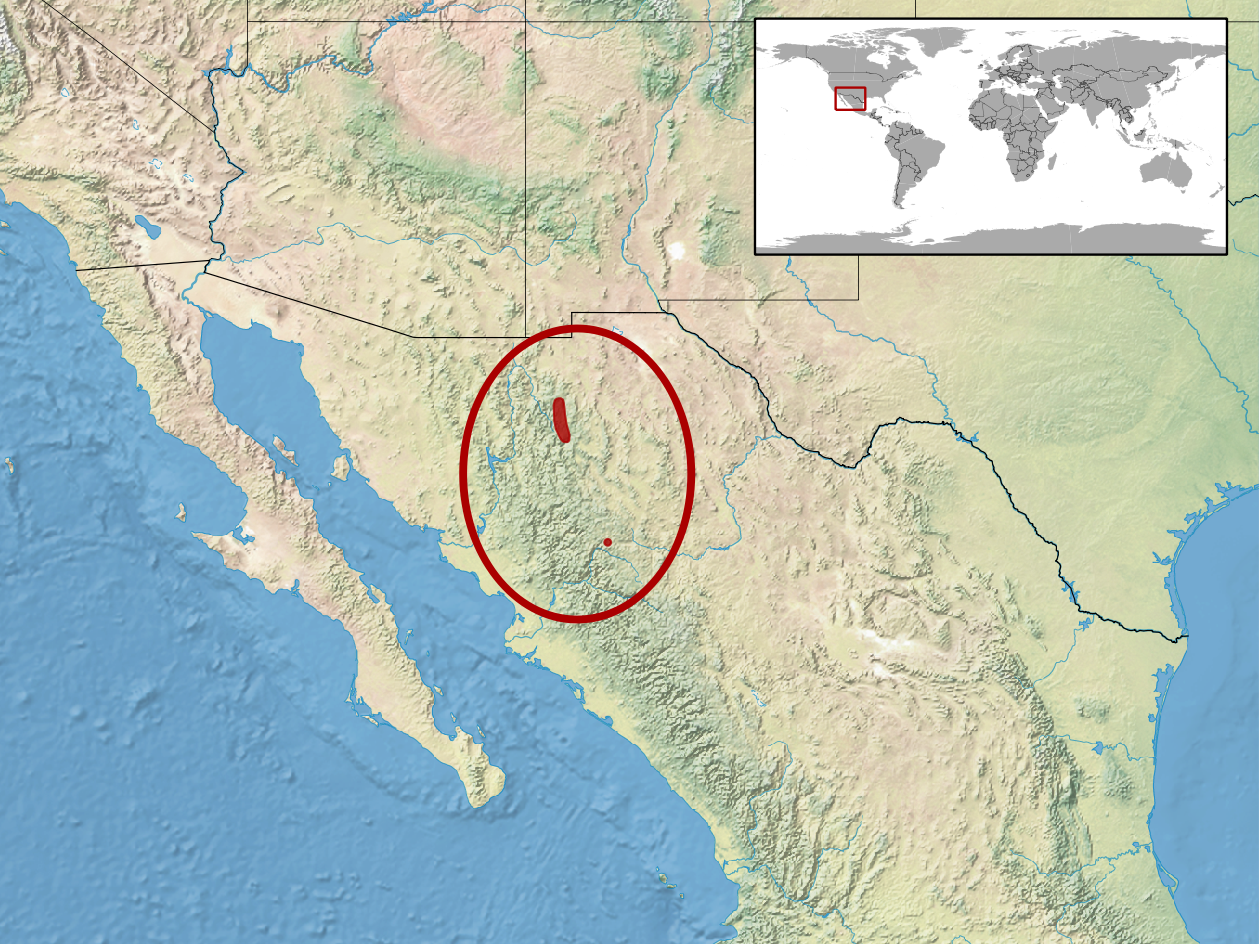

Synonyms
- Eumeces multilineatus Tanner, 1957

Species of reptile

Plestiodon multilineatus, the Chihuahuan skink, is a species of skink. It is endemic to the state of Chihuahua, Mexico.

Plestiodon multilineatus can grow to 70 mm (2.8 in) in snout–vent length.
