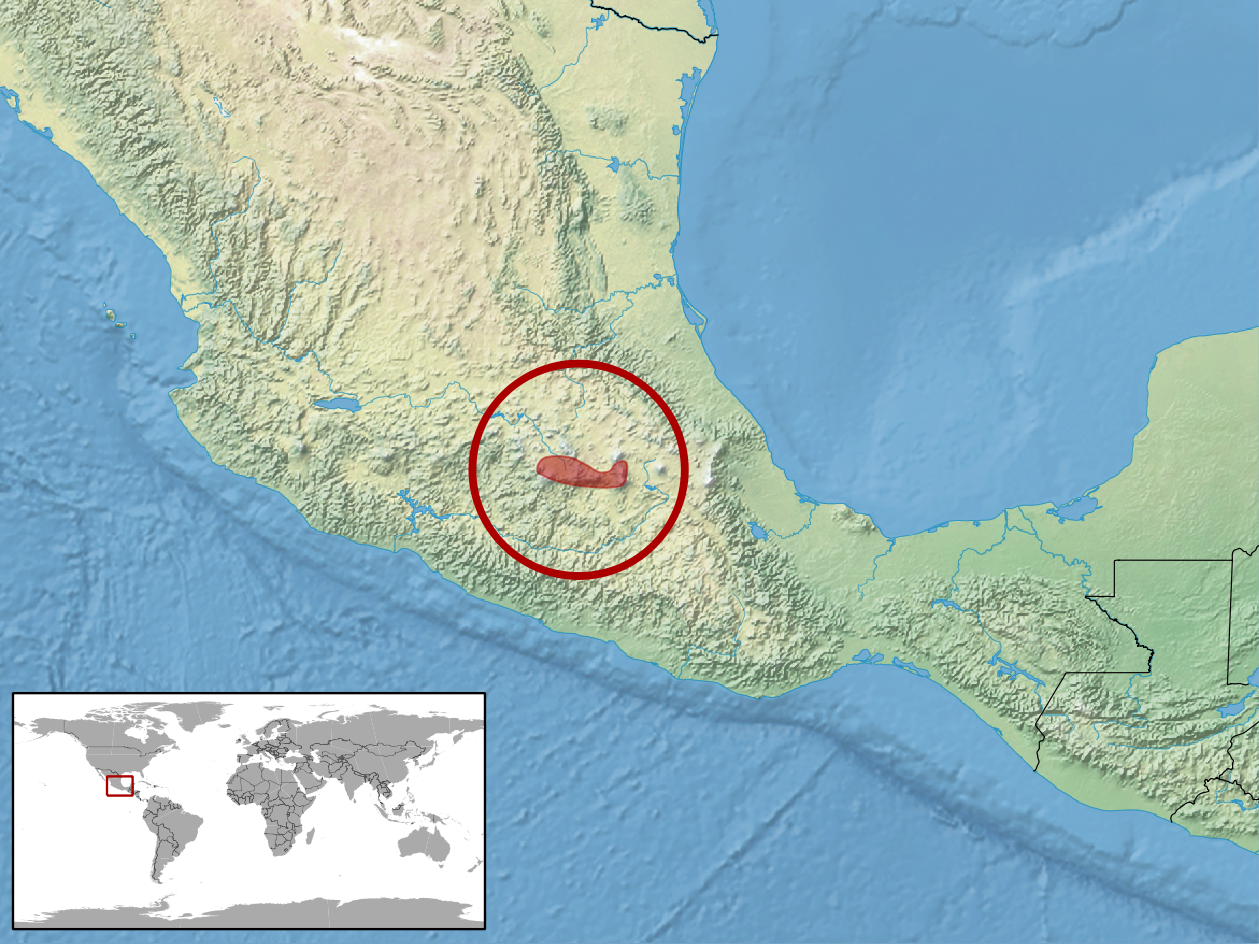
- Geographic distribution of Plestiodon copei

Conservation status
- Least Concern (IUCN 3.1)

Scientific classification
- Kingdom: Animalia
- Phylum: Chordata
- Class: Reptilia
- Order: Squamata
- Family: Scincidae
- Genus: Plestiodon
- Species: P. copei

Binomial name
- Plestiodon copei (Taylor, 1933)

Synonyms
- Eumeces copei Taylor, 1933; Plestiodon copei — Schmitz, Mausfeld & Embert, 2004

= Plestiodon copei =

Species of reptile

Plestiodon copei, also known commonly as Cope's skink, is a species of lizard in the family Scincidae. The species is endemic to Mexico.

== Etymology ==
The specific name, copei, is in honor of Edward Drinker Cope, who was an American herpetologist and paleontologist.

== Geographic range ==
Native to central Mexico, P. copei is found in the Distrito Federal and in the Mexican states of México, Morelos, Michoacán, Puebla, and Veracruz.

== Habitat ==
The preferred natural habitat of P. copei is pine and pine-oak forest.

== Reproduction ==
P. copei is viviparous.
