= Plestiodon lynxe =

Conservation status
- Least Concern (IUCN 3.1)

Scientific classification
- Kingdom: Animalia
- Phylum: Chordata
- Class: Reptilia
- Order: Squamata
- Family: Scincidae
- Genus: Plestiodon
- Species: P. lynxe

Binomial name
- Plestiodon lynxe (Wiegmann, 1834)
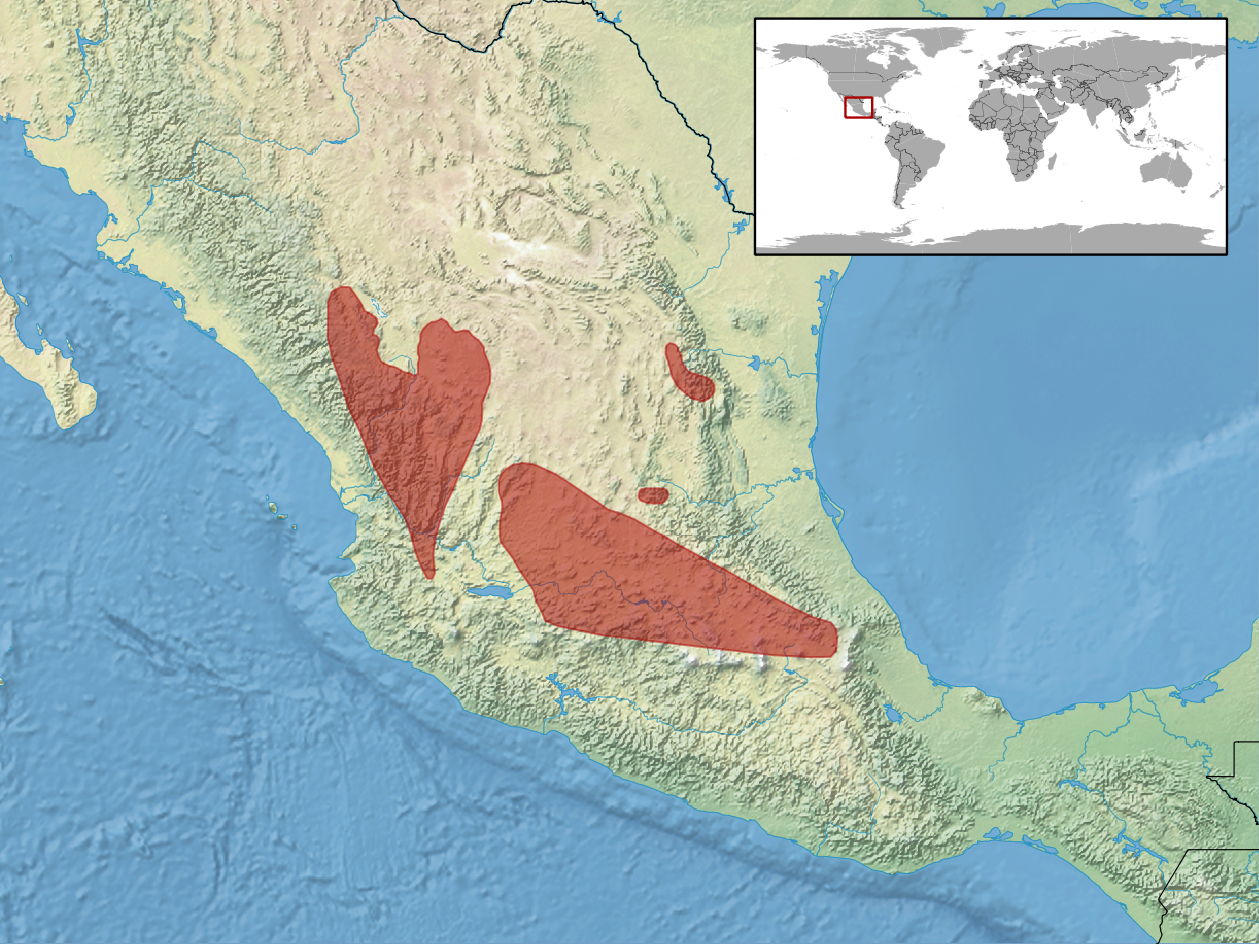

Synonyms
- Euprepes lynxe Wiegmann, 1834; Eumeces lynxe — W. Peters, 1864; Plestiodon lynxe — Schmitz et al., 2004

Species of reptile

Plestiodon lynxe, also known commonly as the oak forest skink, is a species of lizard in the family Scincidae. The species is endemic to Mexico. There are three recognized subspecies.

== Habitat ==
The preferred natural habitat of P. lynxe is oak forest or pine-oak forest, at altitudes of 1,800–2,700 m (5,900–8,900 ft).

== Diet ==
P. bellii preys upon insects and other arthropods.

== Reproduction ==
P. lynxe is viviparous. Maximum recorded litter size is five neonates.

== Subspecies ==
Three subspecies are recognized as being valid, including the nominotypical subspecies.

- Plestiodon lynxe bellii Gray, 1845
- Plestiodon lynxe furcirostris (Cope, 1885)
- Plestiodon lynxe lynxe (Wiegmann, 1834)

Nota bene: A trinomial authority in parentheses indicates that the subspecies was originally described in a genus other than Plestiodon.

== Etymology ==
The subspecific name, bellii, is in honor of English zoologist Thomas Bell.
