= Plestiodon coreensis =

Conservation status
- Data Deficient (IUCN 3.1)

Scientific classification
- Kingdom: Animalia
- Phylum: Chordata
- Class: Reptilia
- Order: Squamata
- Suborder: Scinciformata
- Infraorder: Scincomorpha
- Family: Scincidae
- Genus: Plestiodon
- Species: P. coreensis

Binomial name
- Plestiodon coreensis (Doi & Kamita, 1937)

Synonyms
- Eumeces coreensis Doi & Kamita, 1937

Species of reptile

Plestiodon coreensis, also known as Smith's skink, is a species of skink. It is endemic to North Korea. It is only known from two localities in extreme northwestern North Korea, near the Chinese border, where it was last collected more than 80 years ago. It is a little known species occurring in an area that is difficult to survey.
