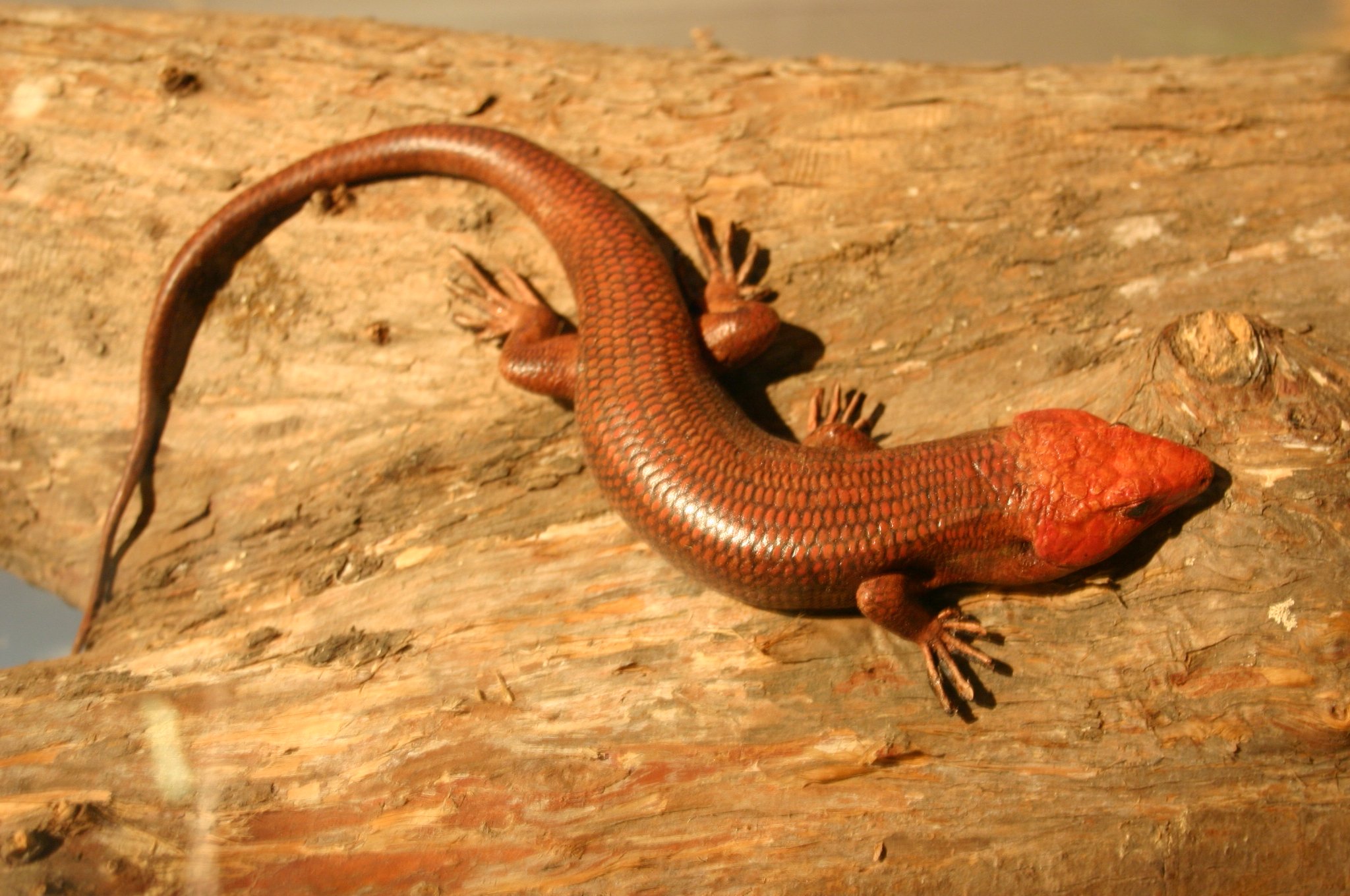

Conservation status
- Least Concern (IUCN 3.1)

- Secure (NatureServe)

Scientific classification
- Kingdom: Animalia
- Phylum: Chordata
- Class: Reptilia
- Order: Squamata
- Family: Scincidae
- Genus: Plestiodon
- Species: P. laticeps

Binomial name
- Plestiodon laticeps (Schneider, 1801)
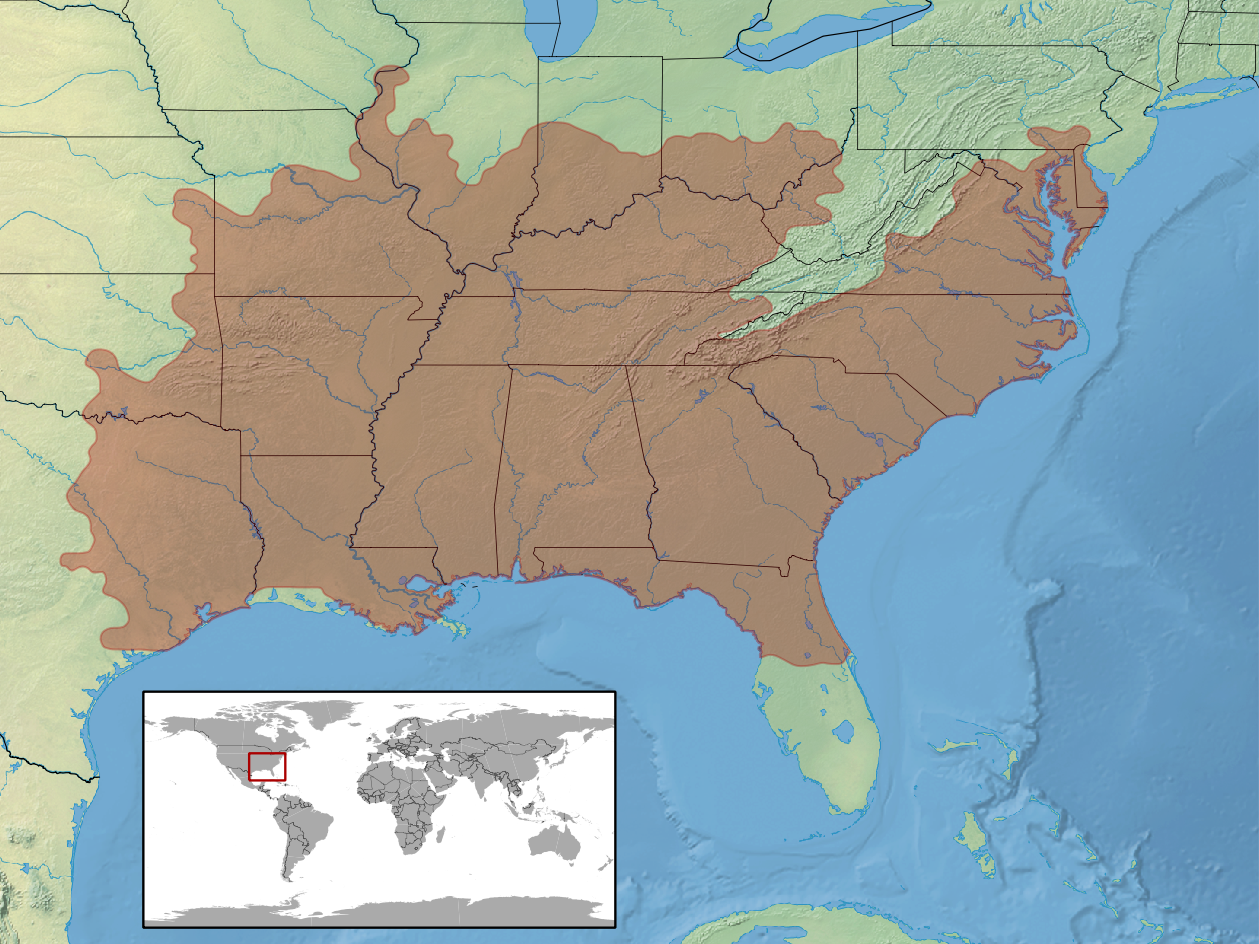

Synonyms
- Scincus laticeps Schneider, 1801; Plestiodon laticeps — A.M.C. Duméril & Bibron, 1839; Eumeces laticeps — Taylor, 1936; Plestiodon laticeps — Collins & Taggart, 2009

= Plestiodon laticeps =

Broad-headed skink

Species of reptile

The broad-headed skink or broadhead skink (Plestiodon laticeps) is species of lizard, endemic to the southeastern United States. The broadhead skink occurs in sympatry with the five-lined skink (Plestiodon fasciatus) and Southeastern five-lined skink (Plestiodon inexpectatus) in forest of the Southeastern United States. All three species are phenotypically similar throughout much of their development and were considered a single species prior to the mid-1930s.

== Description ==
Together with the Great Plains skink it is the largest of the "Plestiodon skinks", growing from a total length of 15 cm (5.9 in) to nearly 33 cm (13 in).

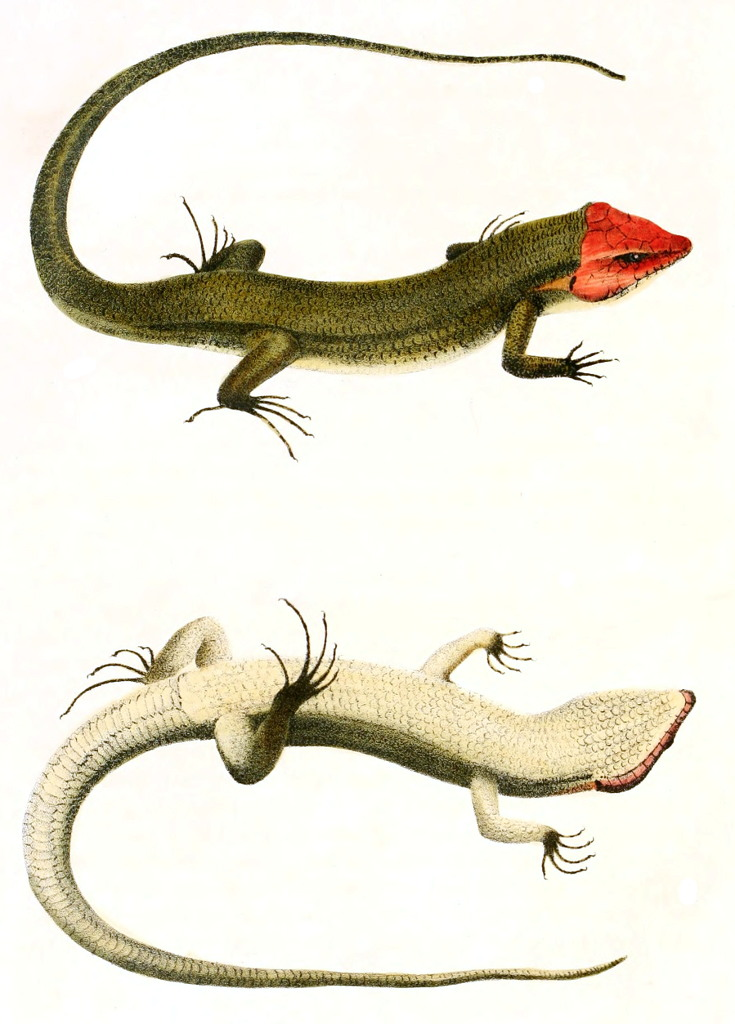
A male broad-headed skink, illustration from Holbrook's North American Herpetology, 1842.

The broad-headed skink gets its name from the wide jaws, giving the head a triangular appearance. Adult males are brown or olive brown in color and have bright orange heads during the mating season in spring. Females have five light stripes running down the back and the tail, similar to the Five-lined Skink. However, they can be distinguished by having five labial scales around the mouth, whereas Five-lined skinks have only four. Females can also retain their blue juvenile tails, unlike males. Juveniles are black and with 5 (sometimes 7 in eastern parts of range) white or yellowish stripes and a blue tail.

== Habitat ==
Broad-headed skinks are semi-arboreal lizards that are strongly associated with live oak trees. It does not appear that the lizards have a preference for tree size, rather they prefer trees with holes. Juveniles stay closer to the ground on low or fallen branches. Males have been known to guard preferred trees that are surrounded with dense brushes to limit attack by predators and harbor prey. Dead and decaying trees are important habitat resources for nesting. Fallen logs are also essential because during the winter following the breeding season it is seen that small groups of broad-headed skink gather in hibernacula under the ground or in rotting logs. The occurrence of the species was seen to correlate with the presence of black walnut (Juglans nigra).

== Behavior ==
Broad-headed skinks are the most arboreal of the North American Plestiodon. They forage on the ground, but also easily and often climb trees for shelter, to sleep, or to search for food. Broad-headed skinks often feed on what are called "hidden prey"; prey items that can only be located by searching under debris, soil or litter. Broad-headed skinks are preyed on by a variety of organisms including carnivorous birds, larger reptiles, and mammals. Skinks prefer to flee by climbing a nearby tree or seeking shelter under foliage. When rapidly approached, however, these skinks will run a greater distance length to find a more secure spot, than a lizard that is approached slowly who would seek shelter under leaf litter. These skinks exhibit tail autotomy when caught by a predator. The tails break away and continue to move, distracting the predator and allowing the skink to flee. This species is capable of detecting integumentary chemical stimuli from two species of snakes that are sympatric predators of lizards. Typically, females will flee before males do when found in pairs. Males during the breeding season tend to stand their ground, likely due to the possibility of losing a mate. Broad-headed Skinks rely on coloration and directional stimuli to determine which end of their prey item to attack. When consuming large invertebrates, they often carry them to shelter to avoid being preyed upon during the prey handling time.

== Diet ==
Broad-headed skinks consume a wide variety of different organisms, but mostly consume insects, insect larvae, gastropods, and spiders. They are diurnal (daytime) feeders, and will actively hunt their prey. Their diet consists of what is available at the time of day they are feeding. Broad-headed skinks have been documented consuming Anolis lizards, as well as cannibalizing juvenile broad-headed skinks. Their larger body size allows for them to consume a wider range of prey. They are very opportunistic hunters, and they use strategy to determine the desirability of their prey. They have been seen avoiding predators and dismissing food when too dangerous. Smaller prey is easier to grab, and they can eat it right away, whereas larger prey takes longer and might put them at risk of being predated on. Because handling time increases with prey size, larger prey are not necessarily the most profitable.

== Reproduction ==
Males typically are larger than females. Large males guard females during breeding season using aggressive behavior with other males, and remain in pairs for long periods of time for foraging, basking, and mating. The larger the female, the more eggs she will lay. Males thus often try to mate with the largest female they can find, and they sometimes engage in severe fights with other males over access to a female. Large adult males in South Carolina will guard females within their territories and chase away smaller males. Females will also mate with the largest males they can find, a result of the Good Genes Hypothesis. Females only have a preference on body size of males when reproducing, they tend to look over the more dominant feature of bright orange heads on this species. Females emit a pheromone from glands in the base of the tail when they are sexually receptive and males can find them by tracking their chemical trails through tongue-flicking. Males show higher tongue flicking rates when exposed to conspecific females verses heterospecific females when mating and will terminate behavioral interaction without initiating courtship if the pheromones do not match the species. Males can get particularly aggressive during mating season and even display mate guarding. Mate guarding thus lasts through a major portion of the mating season, which appears to be limited to about two weeks. Mate guarding can be costly, many suffer injuries and fatality at the hands of guarding their female. When pregnant, females experience a decrease in running (25%) and endurance (50%), thus switch to a less active or conspicuous role on the surface to avoid predators. The female lays between 8 and 22 eggs, which she guards and protects until they hatch in June or July. Female broadhead skinks will lay their clutch in decaying log cavities, and they have been observed to create a sort of nest by packing down debris within their cavities. The hatchlings have a total length of 6 centimetres (2.4 in) to 8 centimetres (3.1 in).

== Geographic range ==
Broad-headed skinks are widely distributed in the southeastern states of the United States, from the East Coast to Kansas and eastern Texas and from Ohio to the Gulf Coast.

== Nonvenomous ==
These skinks (along with the similar Plestiodon fasciatus) are sometimes wrongly thought to be venomous. Broad-headed skinks are nonvenomous.

== See also ==
- Gilbert's Skink – similar morphology
