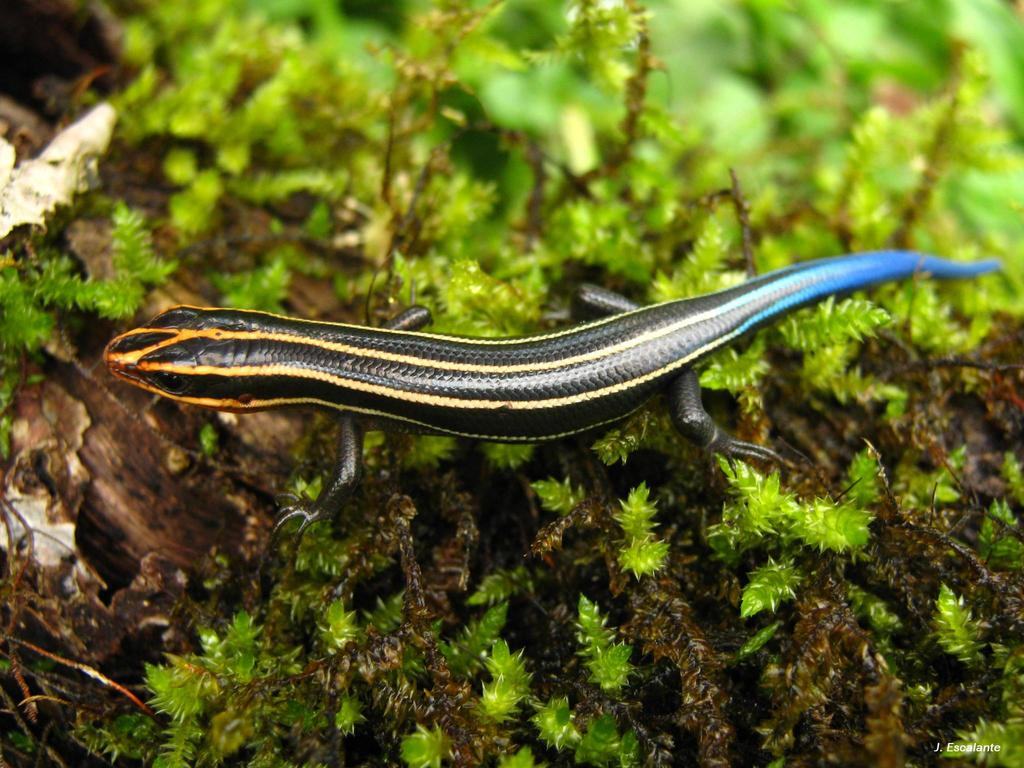

Conservation status
- Least Concern (IUCN 3.1)

Scientific classification
- Domain: Eukaryota
- Kingdom: Animalia
- Phylum: Chordata
- Class: Reptilia
- Order: Squamata
- Family: Scincidae
- Genus: Plestiodon
- Species: P. sumichrasti

Binomial name
- Plestiodon sumichrasti (Cope, 1867)

= Plestiodon sumichrasti =

Species of reptile

Plestiodon sumichrasti, Sumichrast's skink, is a species of lizard which is endemic to Mexico.
