= Alfredo Dugès =

French-born Mexican physician and naturalist

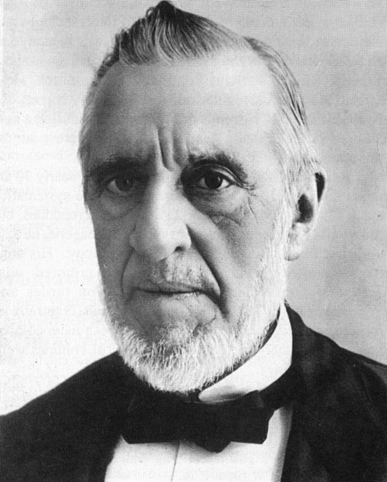
Alfredo Dugès (1826–1910)

Alfredo Dugès (born Alfred Auguste Delsescautz Dugès; 16 April 1826 – 7 January 1910) was a French-born, Mexican physician and naturalist born in Montpellier. He was the son of zoologist Antoine Louis Dugès (1797–1838). Alfredo Dugès is largely remembered for his extensive studies of Mexican herpetology.

He studied medicine at the University of Paris, and in 1852 emigrated to Mexico. He settled in Guanajuato, where he worked as an obstetrician, also giving classes in natural history at the Escuela de Estudios Superiores de Guanajuato. With his brother, entomologist Eugenio Dugès (1826–1895), he organized frequent field trips in order to collect specimens.

Dugès published numerous scientific papers in several fields including herpetology, botany, and entomology. At Guanajuato, he was director of the local museum, later named the Museo Alfredo Dugès (es) in his honor. In Mexico, he described 40 new species of reptiles and amphibians, of which nearly half are considered valid today. As a botanist, he is the taxonomic authority of the genus Barcena (family Rhamnaceae).

Dugès is commemorated in the scientific names of five taxa (three species and two subspecies) of reptiles: Diadophis punctatus dugesi, Geophis dugesii, Phrynosoma orbiculare dugesi, Plestiodon dugesii, and Sceloporus dugesii.

== See also ==
- Category:Taxa named by Alfredo Dugès

== Books about Alfredo Dugès ==
- "Early foundations of Mexican herpetology; an annotated and indexed bibliography of the herpetological publications of Alfredo Dugès, 1826-1910", by Hobart M. Smith and Rozella B. Smith.
