= Plestiodon takarai =

Conservation status
- Data Deficient (IUCN 3.1)

Scientific classification
- Kingdom: Animalia
- Phylum: Chordata
- Class: Reptilia
- Order: Squamata
- Family: Scincidae
- Genus: Plestiodon
- Species: P. takarai

Binomial name
- Plestiodon takarai Kurita, Ota, & Hikida, 2017

Species of reptile

Plestiodon takarai, the Senkaku skink, is a species of lizard. It is endemic to the Senkaku Islands, Japan.
