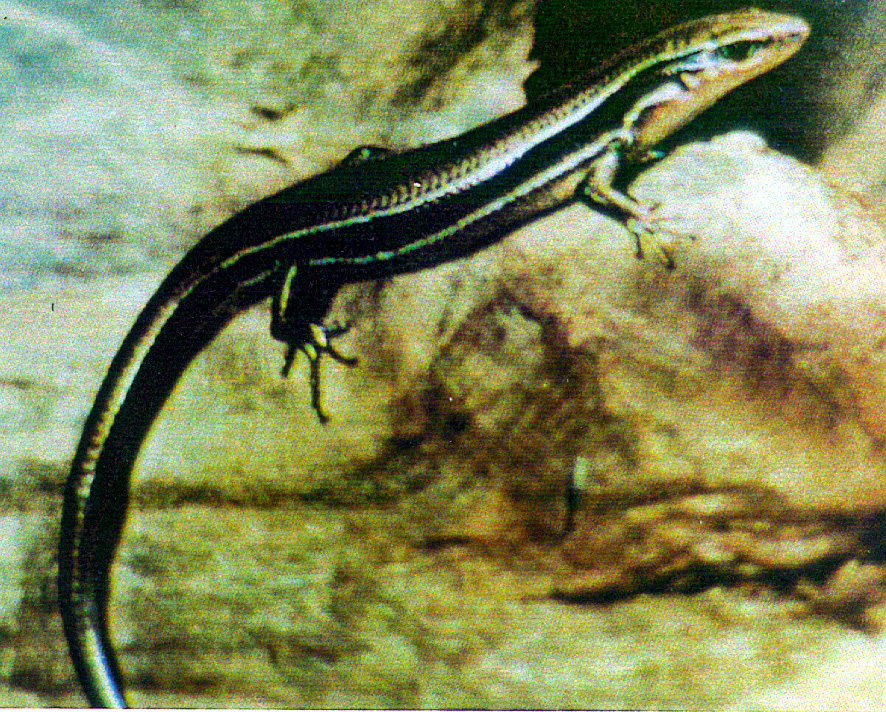

Conservation status
- Least Concern (IUCN 3.1)

Scientific classification
- Kingdom: Animalia
- Phylum: Chordata
- Class: Reptilia
- Order: Squamata
- Family: Scincidae
- Genus: Plestiodon
- Species: P. anthracinus

Binomial name
- Plestiodon anthracinus Baird, 1850
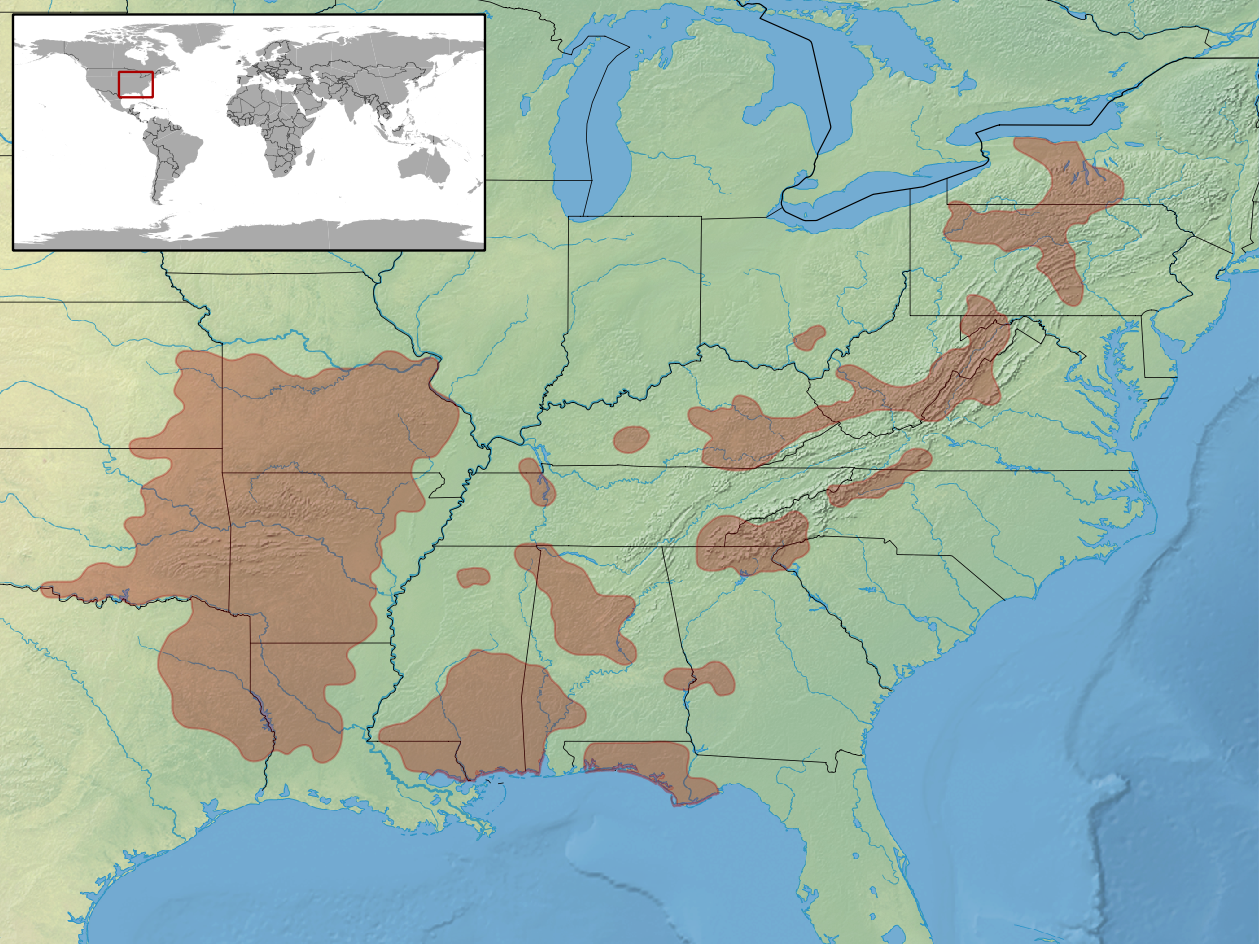

Synonyms
- Plestiodon anthracinus Baird, 1850; Eumeces anthracinus — Taylor, 1936; Plestiodon anthracinus — Schmitz et al., 2004

= Plestiodon anthracinus =

Species of reptile

Plestiodon anthracinus, the coal skink, is a species of lizard which is endemic to the United States.

== Description ==
It is a mid-sized lizard with short well developed legs, and overlap when addressed in most specimens, except gravid females. It grows to 13–18 cm (5.1–7.1 in) in total length with a maximum snout-to-vent length (SVL) of 7 cm (2.8 in). It is a four-lined skink whose light stripes extend onto the tail. The broad dark lateral stripe is 4–4.5 scales wide and there are no light lines on top of the head. The dorsolateral light stripe is on the edges of the 3rd and 4th scale rows, counting from midline of back. One postmental scale is present. The sides of the head of the male are reddish during spring breeding season, at least in some parts of the range.

== Taxonomy ==
Two subspecies of the coal skink are recognized, including the nominotypical subspecies:

- Northern coal skink – Plestiodon anthracinus anthracinus Baird, 1850
- Southern coal skink – Plestiodon anthracinus pluvialis (Cope, 1880)

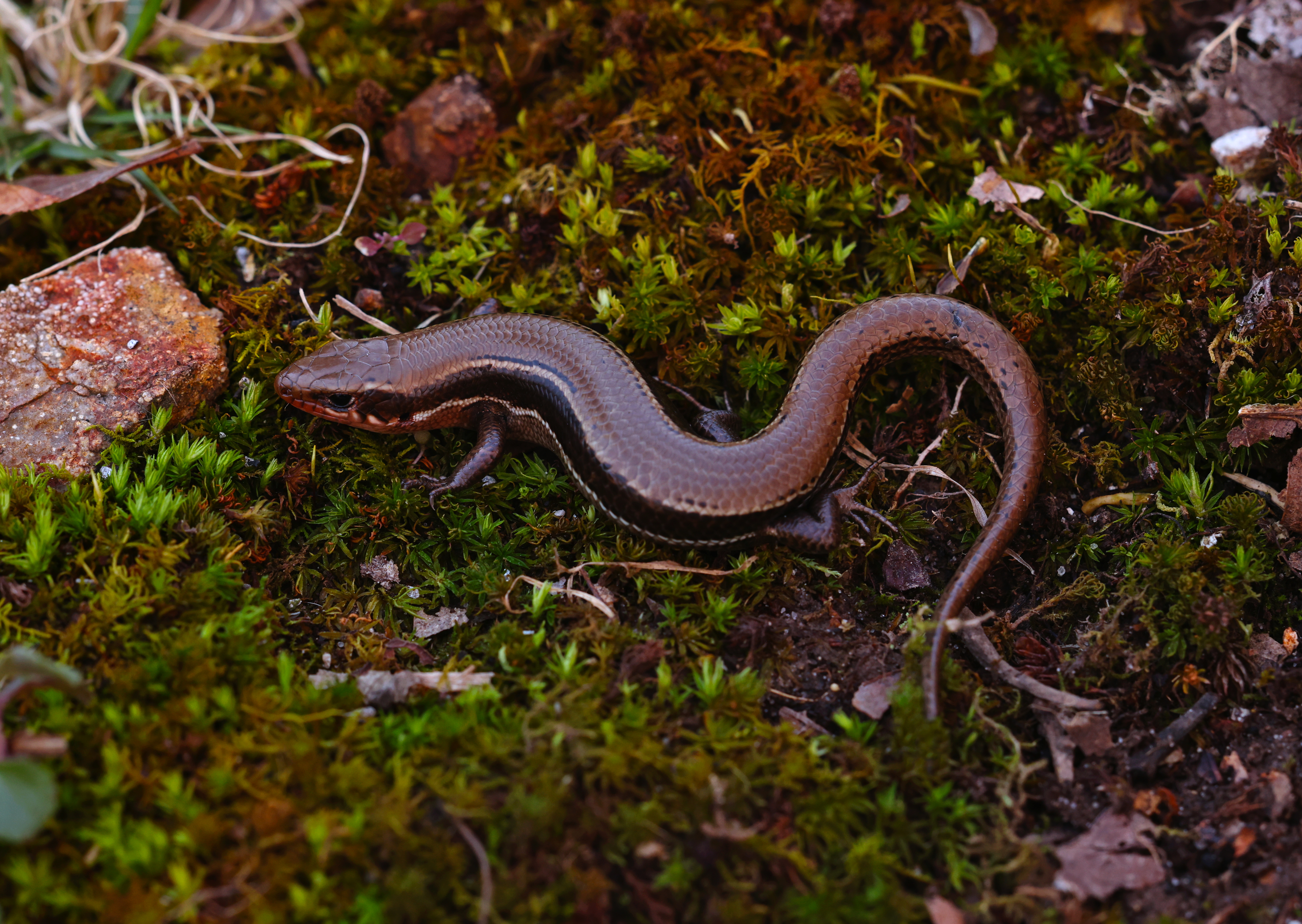

The (northern) coal skink was first described by Baird in 1850; the southern subspecies P. a. pluvialis was identified by Cope in 1880. They are the near the ancestral form for the fasciatus group.

The southern coal skink as a subspecies has posterior supralabials with light centers and dark edges, producing a spotted appearance. There are 26 or more rows of scales around the middle of the body.

== Reproduction ==
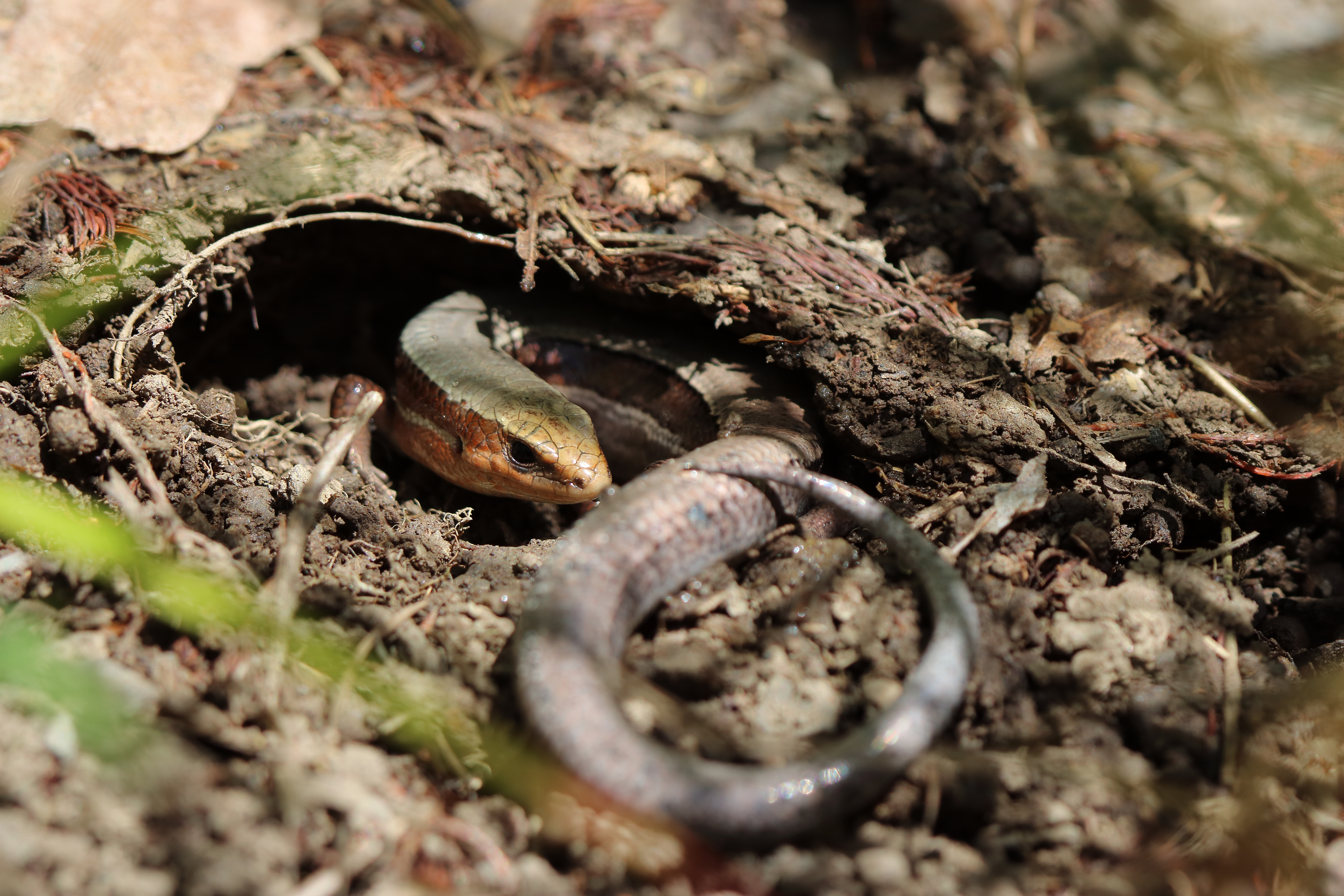
A coal skink's burrow

The coal skink mates in spring or early summer, laying a clutch of 8 or 9 eggs. Their eggs are typically around 10–11 mm in length. Courting for this species usually involves the male's initial investigation and recognition of a potential female through pheromonal cues. The young hatch after four to five weeks and are about 5 cm (2.0 in) long. The hatchlings have a blue tail; those of the northern coal skink are striped like the adults, but young southern coal skinks have black bodies with at the utmost faint traces of stripes.

== Habitat and Geographic range ==
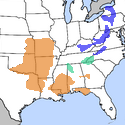
Coal skink distribution

The more humid portions of wooded hillsides with abundant leaf litter or loose stones are favorite habitats. Coal skinks' habitat may also include areas around springs, rocky bluffs overlooking creek valleys, and mesic sites. If pursued, they will take refuge in shallow water, going to the bottom and hiding under stones or debris.

The northern coal skink (blue in the figure) occurs in western New York and central Pennsylvania and in isolated colonies in the Appalachians. The southern coal skink (orange) can be found on the eastern Gulf coast from the Florida panhandle to Louisiana as well as west of the Mississippi from eastern Kansas and central Missouri to eastern Texas and northern Louisiana. Scattered intermingled occurrences of both subspecies (green in the figure) occur in Alabama and in Georgia. Their current natural threats include a number of small mammals, snakes, and larger species of lizards. Human influence has also been known to pose a threat to this species, due to habitat decrease and degradation for a number of reptile species.

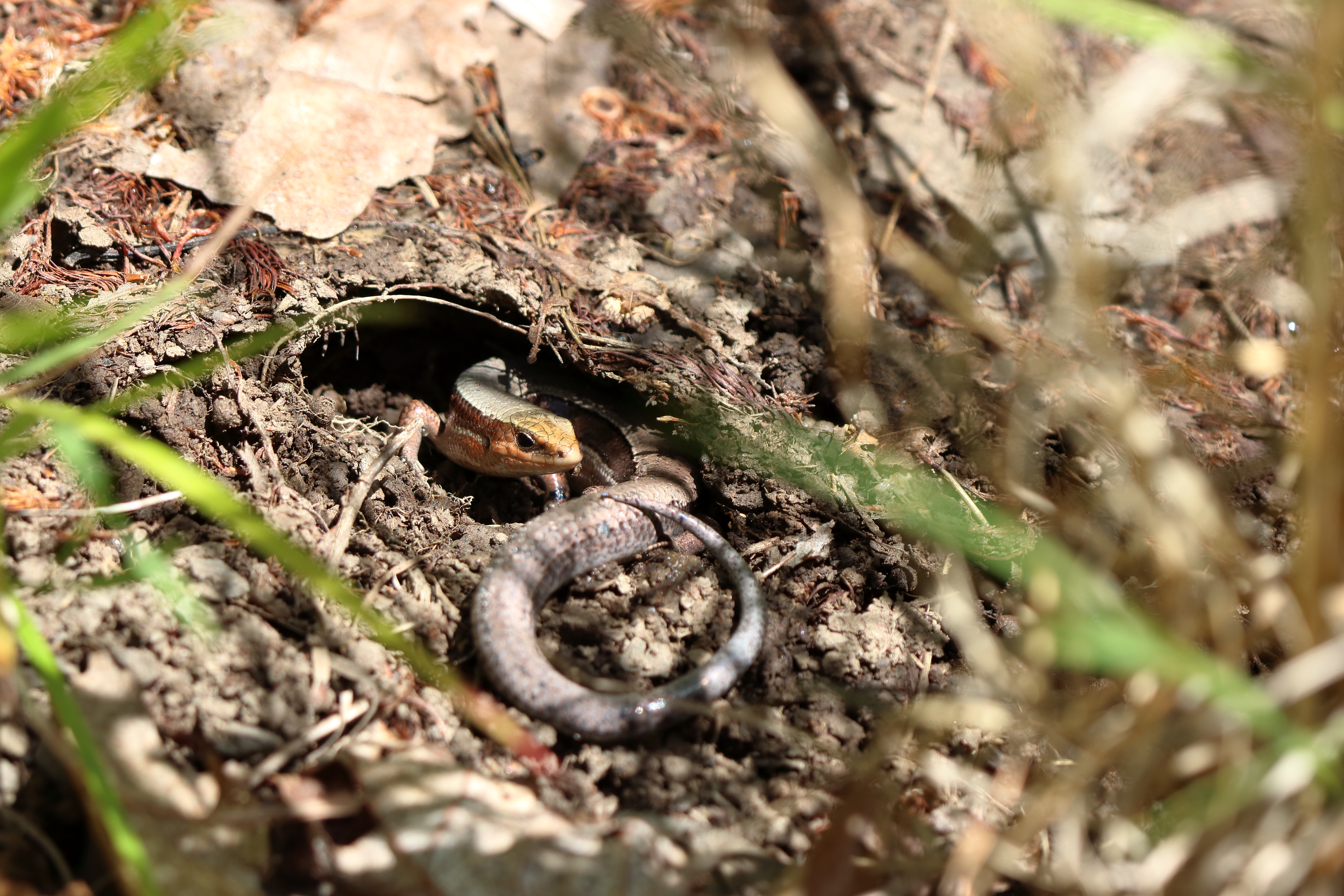
Northern coal skink (Plestiodon anthracinus anthracinus)

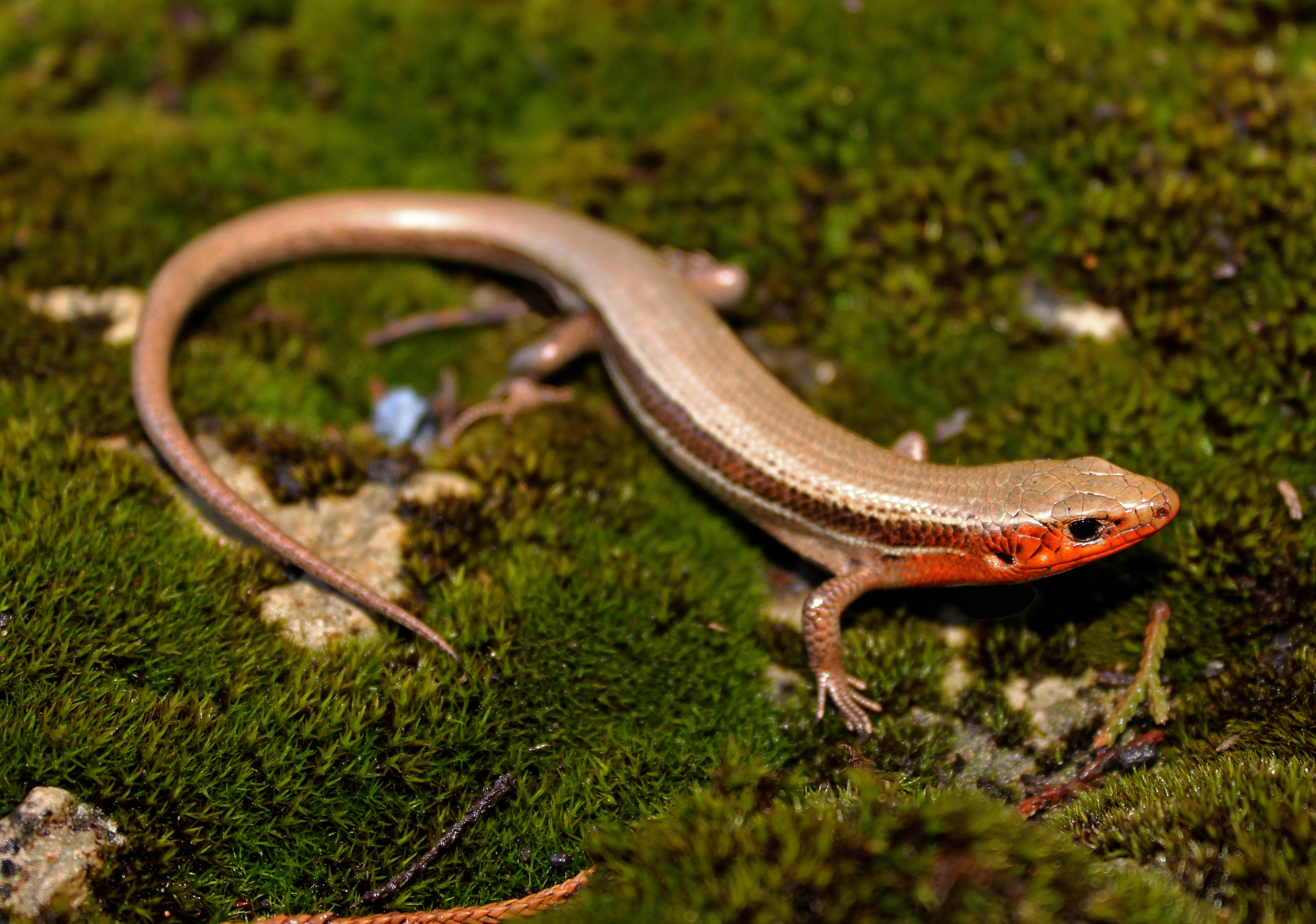
Southern coal skink (Plestiodon anthracinus pluvialis)
