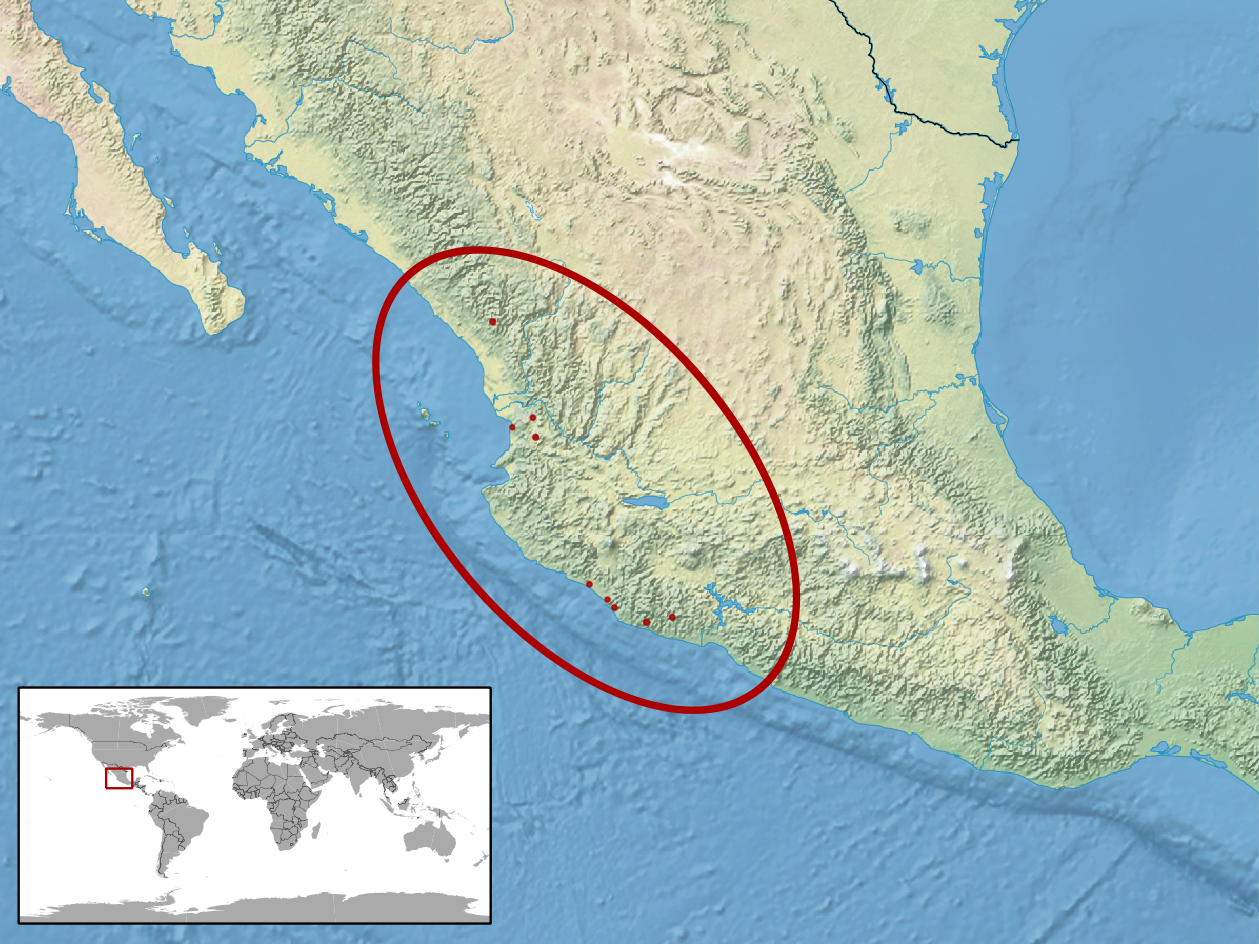
- Geographic distribution of Plestiodon parvulus

Conservation status
- Data Deficient (IUCN 3.1)

Scientific classification
- Kingdom: Animalia
- Phylum: Chordata
- Class: Reptilia
- Order: Squamata
- Suborder: Scinciformata
- Infraorder: Scincomorpha
- Family: Scincidae
- Genus: Plestiodon
- Species: P. parvulus

Binomial name
- Plestiodon parvulus (Taylor, 1933)

= Plestiodon parvulus =

Species of reptile

Plestiodon parvulus, the southern pygmy skink, is a species of lizard which is endemic to Mexico.
