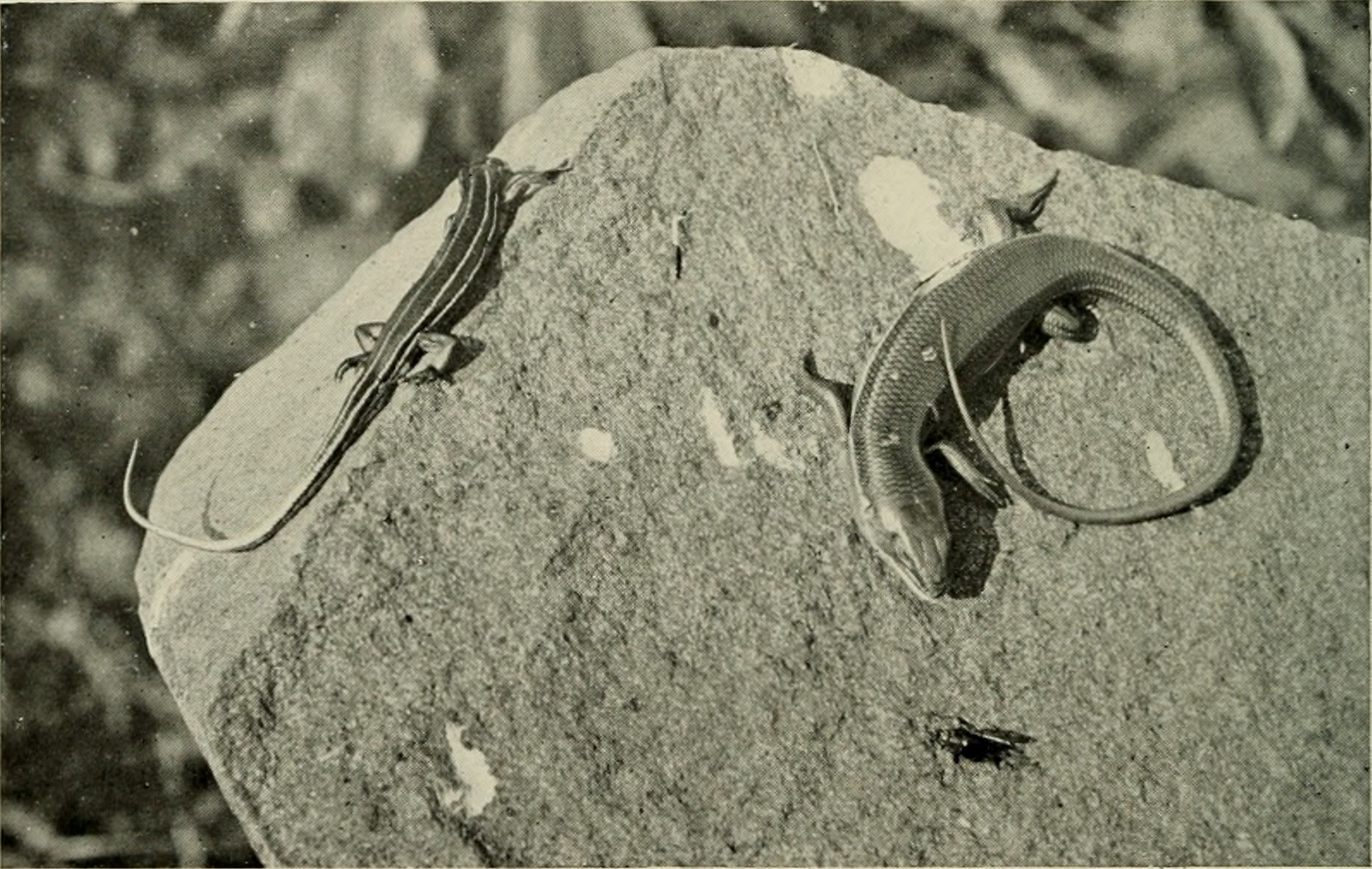

Conservation status
- Least Concern (IUCN 3.1)

Scientific classification
- Kingdom: Animalia
- Phylum: Chordata
- Class: Reptilia
- Order: Squamata
- Suborder: Scinciformata
- Infraorder: Scincomorpha
- Family: Scincidae
- Genus: Plestiodon
- Species: P. quadrilineatus

Binomial name
- Plestiodon quadrilineatus Blyth, 1853

= Plestiodon quadrilineatus =

Species of reptile

Plestiodon quadrilineatus, the Hong Kong skink or four-striped skink, is a species of lizard which is found in China, Thailand, Cambodia, and Vietnam.
