= Plestiodon kuchinoshimensis =

Conservation status
- Vulnerable (IUCN 3.1)

Scientific classification
- Kingdom: Animalia
- Phylum: Chordata
- Class: Reptilia
- Order: Squamata
- Suborder: Scinciformata
- Infraorder: Scincomorpha
- Family: Scincidae
- Genus: Plestiodon
- Species: P. kuchinoshimensis

Binomial name
- Plestiodon kuchinoshimensis Kurita & Hikida, 2014

Species of reptile

Plestiodon kuchinoshimensis is a species of skink. It is endemic to Kuchinoshima, an island in the northern part of the Ryukyu Islands (Japan).
