= Plestiodon tunganus =

Conservation status
- Near Threatened (IUCN 3.1)

Scientific classification
- Kingdom: Animalia
- Phylum: Chordata
- Class: Reptilia
- Order: Squamata
- Suborder: Scinciformata
- Infraorder: Scincomorpha
- Family: Scincidae
- Genus: Plestiodon
- Species: P. tunganus

Binomial name
- Plestiodon tunganus (Stejneger, 1924)

Species of reptile

Plestiodon tunganus is a species of lizard which is found in China.
