= Plestiodon dugesii =

Conservation status
- Vulnerable (IUCN 3.1)

Scientific classification
- Kingdom: Animalia
- Phylum: Chordata
- Class: Reptilia
- Order: Squamata
- Family: Scincidae
- Genus: Plestiodon
- Species: P. dugesii

Binomial name
- Plestiodon dugesii (Thominot, 1883)
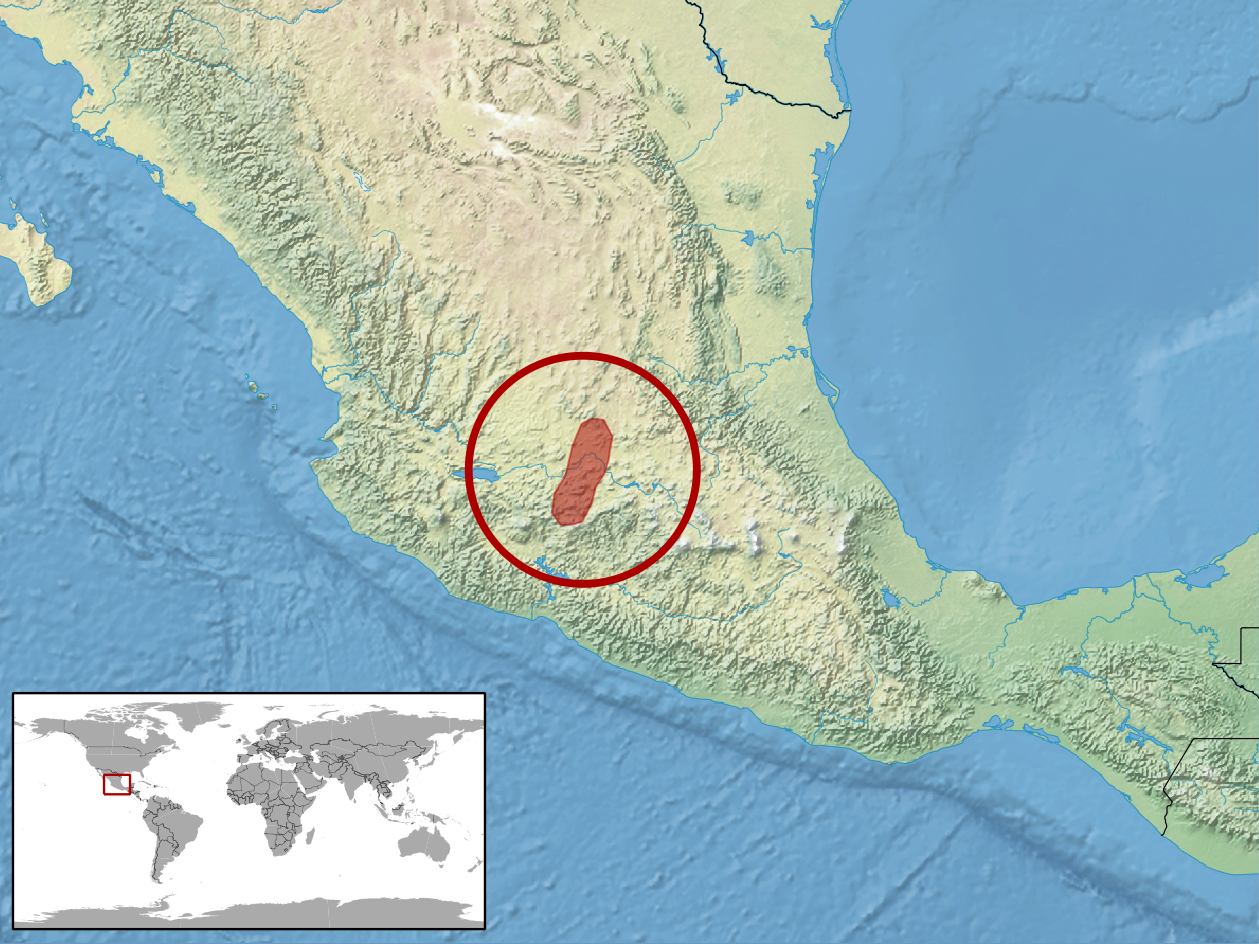

Synonyms
- Eumeces dugesii Thominot, 1883; Plestiodon dugesii — Schmitz, Mausfeld & Embert, 2004

Species of reptile

Plestiodon dugesii, also known commonly as Dugès' skink, Duges's skink, and eslabon in Mexican Spanish, is a species of lizard in the family Scincidae. The species is endemic to Mexico.

== Etymology ==
The specific name, dugesii, is in honor of French-born Mexican naturalist Alfredo Dugès, who is considered to be the "father" of Mexican herpetology.

== Geographic range ==
P. dugesii is found in central Mexico, in the Mexican States of Guanajato and Michoacán.

== Habitat ==
The preferred natural habitat of P. dugesii is forest, at altitudes above 2,000 m (6,600 ft).

== Reproduction ==
P. dugesii is ovoviviparous.
