= Plestiodon colimensis =

Conservation status
- Data Deficient (IUCN 3.1)

Scientific classification
- Kingdom: Animalia
- Phylum: Chordata
- Class: Reptilia
- Order: Squamata
- Suborder: Scinciformata
- Infraorder: Scincomorpha
- Family: Scincidae
- Genus: Plestiodon
- Species: P. colimensis

Binomial name
- Plestiodon colimensis (Taylor, 1935)
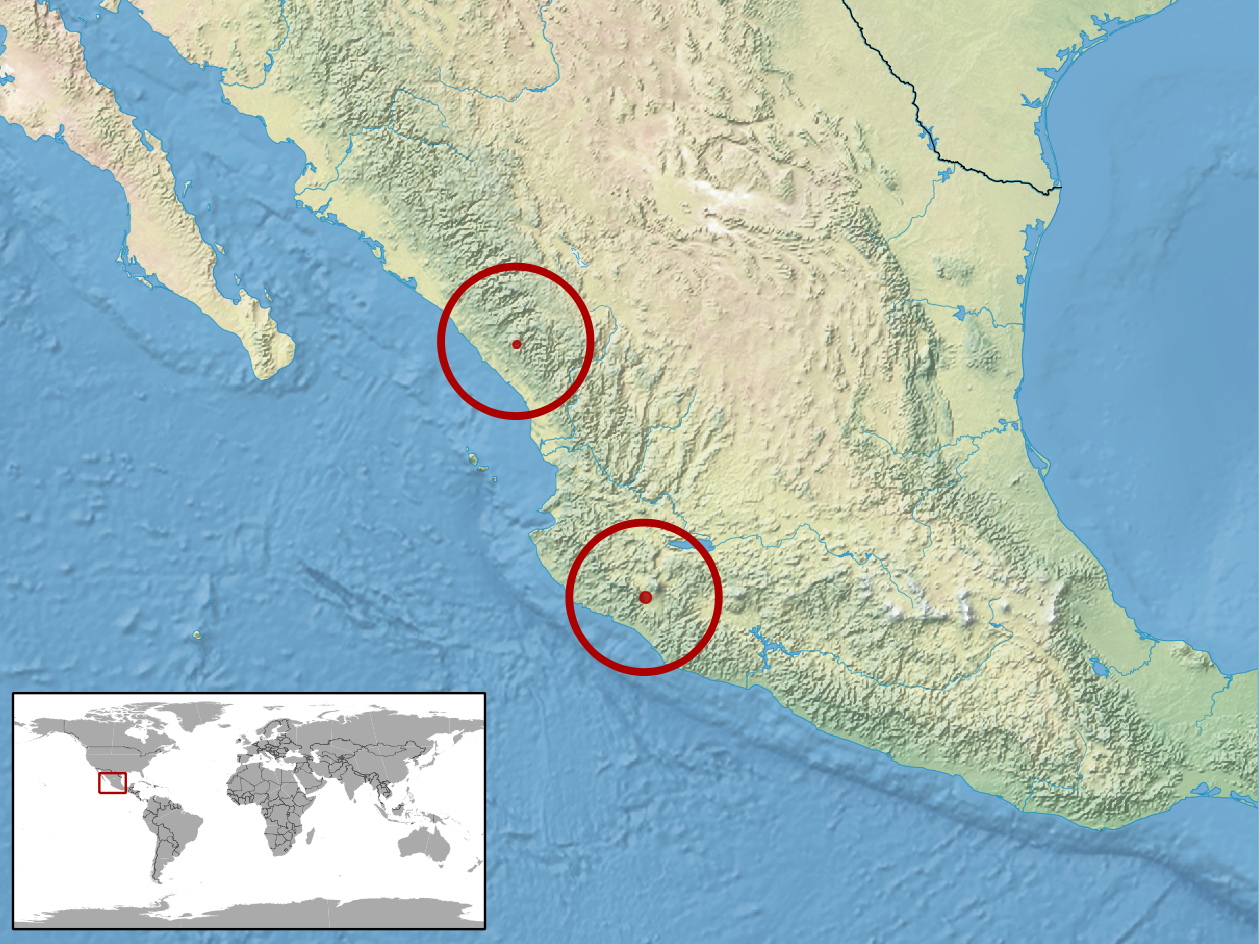

Species of reptile

Plestiodon colimensis, the Colima skink, is a species of lizard which is endemic to Mexico.
