= Plestiodon popei =

Conservation status
- Data Deficient (IUCN 3.1)

Scientific classification
- Kingdom: Animalia
- Phylum: Chordata
- Class: Reptilia
- Order: Squamata
- Family: Scincidae
- Genus: Plestiodon
- Species: P. popei

Binomial name
- Plestiodon popei (Hikida, 1989)

Species of reptile

Plestiodon popei, Pope's skink, is a species of skink. It is endemic to Wuyi Mountains in Fujian, China. It is named in honor of American herpetologist Clifford Hillhouse Pope.
