= Plestiodon oshimensis =

Conservation status
- Near Threatened (IUCN 3.1)

Scientific classification
- Kingdom: Animalia
- Phylum: Chordata
- Class: Reptilia
- Order: Squamata
- Suborder: Scinciformata
- Infraorder: Scincomorpha
- Family: Scincidae
- Genus: Plestiodon
- Species: P. oshimensis

Binomial name
- Plestiodon oshimensis (Thompson, 1912)

Synonyms
- Eumeces oshimensis Thompson, 1912; Eumeces marginatus amamiensis Van Denburgh, 1912; Eumeces marginatus kikaigensis Van Denburgh, 1912; Eumeces marginatus oshimensis (Thompson, 1912); Plestiodon marginatus oshimensis (Thompson, 1912)

Species of reptile

Plestiodon oshimensis, the Ousima skink or Oshima blue tailed skink, is a species of skink. It is endemic to the Amami Islands (northern Ryukyu Islands, Japan).
