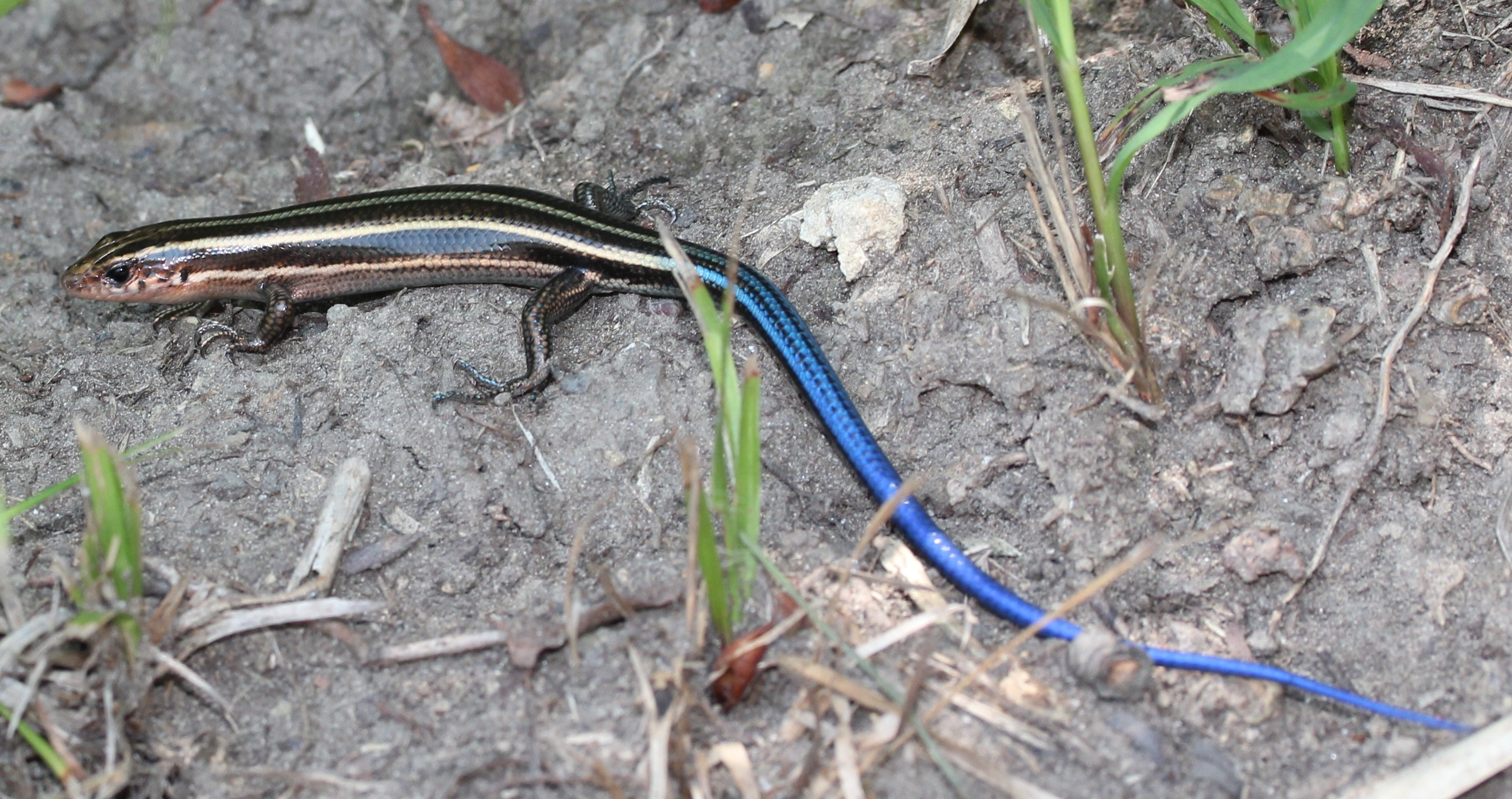

Conservation status
- Least Concern (IUCN 3.1)

Scientific classification
- Kingdom: Animalia
- Phylum: Chordata
- Class: Reptilia
- Order: Squamata
- Suborder: Scinciformata
- Infraorder: Scincomorpha
- Family: Scincidae
- Genus: Plestiodon
- Species: P. finitimus

Binomial name
- Plestiodon finitimus Okamoto & Hikida, 2012

= Plestiodon finitimus =

Species of reptile

Plestiodon finitimus, the Far Eastern skink, is a species of lizard which is endemic to Japan and Russia.
