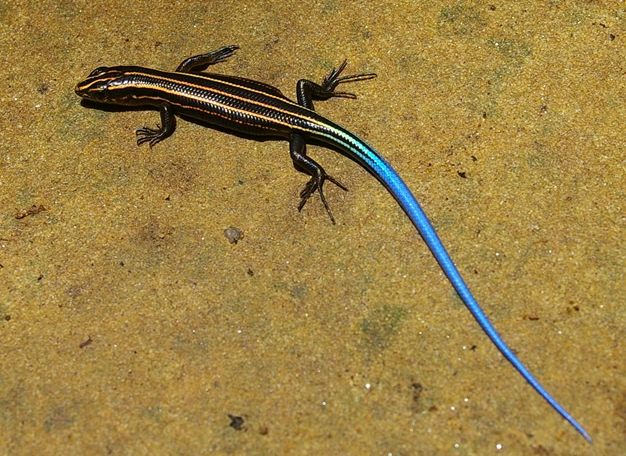

Conservation status
- Near Threatened (IUCN 3.1)

Scientific classification
- Kingdom: Animalia
- Phylum: Chordata
- Class: Reptilia
- Order: Squamata
- Suborder: Scinciformata
- Infraorder: Scincomorpha
- Family: Scincidae
- Genus: Plestiodon
- Species: P. stimpsonii

Binomial name
- Plestiodon stimpsonii (Thompson, 1912)

Synonyms
- Eumeces stimpsonii Thompson, 1912; Eumeces ishigakiensis Thompson, 1912; Lygosoma stimpsonii (Thompson, 1912)

= Plestiodon stimpsonii =

Species of reptile

Plestiodon stimpsonii, Stimpson's skink, is a species of skink. It is endemic to the Yaeyama Islands (southern Ryukyu Islands, Japan).
