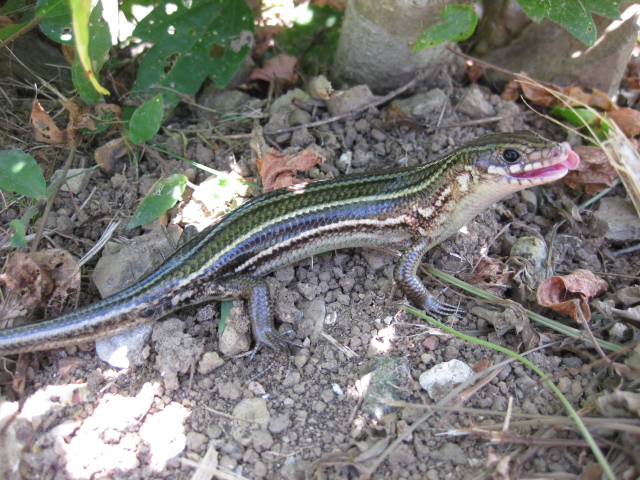

Conservation status
- Vulnerable (IUCN 3.1)

Scientific classification
- Kingdom: Animalia
- Phylum: Chordata
- Class: Reptilia
- Order: Squamata
- Family: Scincidae
- Genus: Plestiodon
- Species: P. kishinouyei

Binomial name
- Plestiodon kishinouyei Stejneger, 1901

Synonyms
- Eumeces kishinouyei

= Kishinoue's giant skink =

Species of lizard

Kishinoue's giant skink (Plestiodon kishinouyei), also known as the Japanese skink, is a species of skink, a lizard in the family Scincidae, endemic to the southern Ryukyu Islands of Japan.

The species name is a tribute to Japanese fisheries biologist Kamakichi Kishinouye (岸上 鎌吉, 1867–1929).

== Description ==
Plestiodon kishinouyei is about 30–40 cm (12–16 in) in total length (including tail), with a snout to vent length of 14.0–17.2 cm (5.5–6.8 in). It is the largest member of its widely distributed, speciose genus, and thus appears to be an example of island gigantism.
