= Mesoscincus managuae =

Conservation status
- Least Concern (IUCN 3.1)

Scientific classification
- Kingdom: Animalia
- Phylum: Chordata
- Class: Reptilia
- Order: Squamata
- Family: Scincidae
- Genus: Mesoscincus
- Species: M. managuae

Binomial name
- Mesoscincus managuae (Dunn, 1933)

Species of skink

The Managua skink (Mesoscincus managuae) is a species of skink, a lizard in the family Scincidae. The species is found in Costa Rica, Nicaragua, Honduras, El Salvador, and Guatemala.
