= Plestiodon brevirostris =

Conservation status
- Least Concern (IUCN 3.1)

Scientific classification
- Kingdom: Animalia
- Phylum: Chordata
- Class: Reptilia
- Order: Squamata
- Suborder: Scinciformata
- Infraorder: Scincomorpha
- Family: Scincidae
- Genus: Plestiodon
- Species: P. brevirostris

Binomial name
- Plestiodon brevirostris (Günther, 1860)
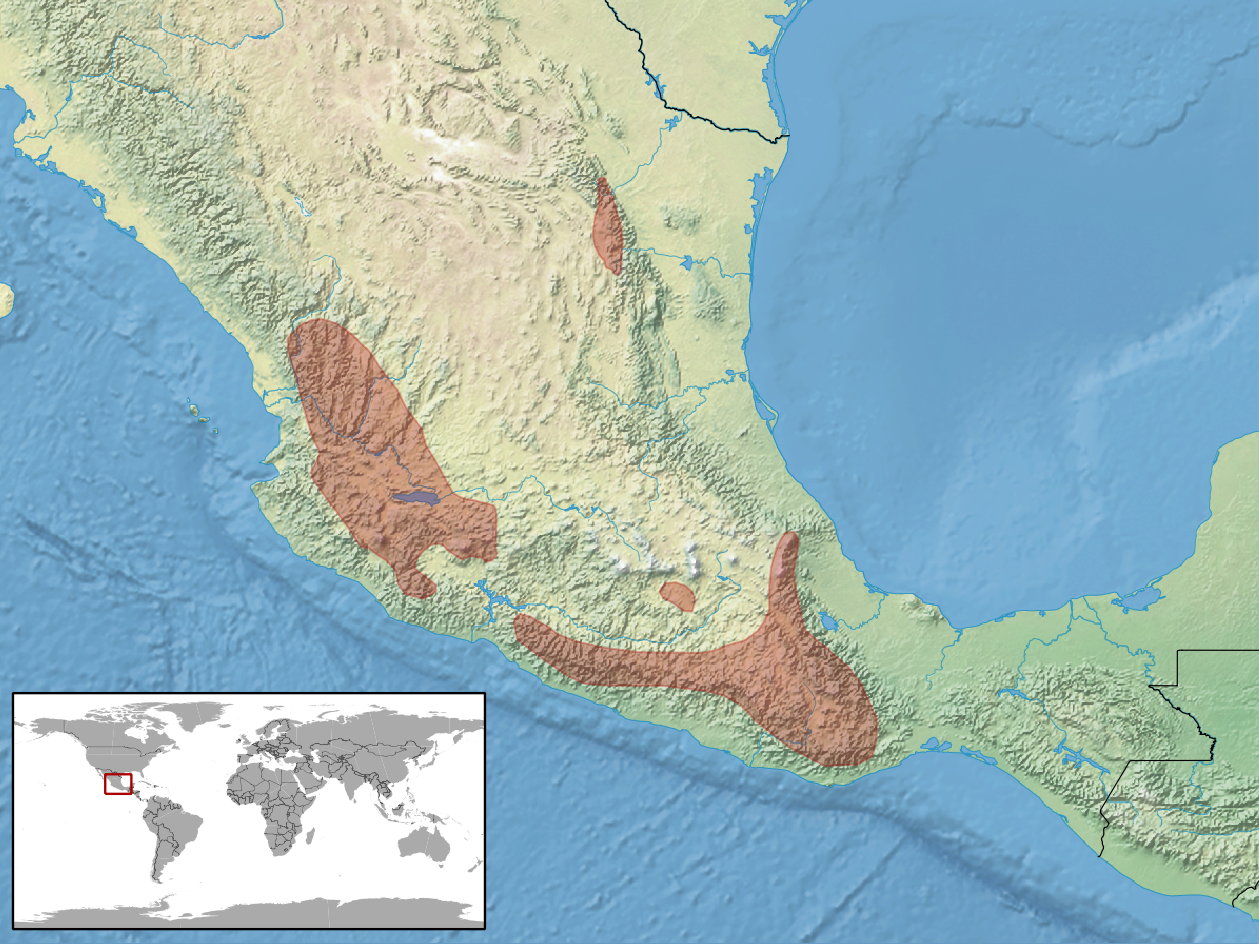

Species of reptile

Plestiodon brevirostris, the short-nosed skink, is a species of lizard endemic to Mexico.

== Description ==
P.Brevirostris can reach a snout-to-vent length (SVL) of 129.8 mm, but on average is around 59.3-62.4 mm. It has a stout olive-gray body, with two dorsolateral light stripes from snout to hind legs, as well as dark brownish-black stripes on the side. The short-nosed skink's belly is pigmented and speckled with scattered dark dots. The male's supralabials are reddish. Fully grown adults have a red or brown (ground color) tail, unlike juvenile tails, which are metallic blue.

== Reproduction ==
The short-nosed skink is ovoviviparous.

== Habitat ==
Short-nosed skinks are endemic to Mexico, and can be found in Guerrero Morelos, Oaxaca, Veracruz, Puebla, MIchoacan, and Nayarit. They live in forests and shrublands at high elevations.

== Entomology ==
The specific name Brevirostris was named after the latin "brevis", meaning short, and "rostrum" which means beak/proboscis.
