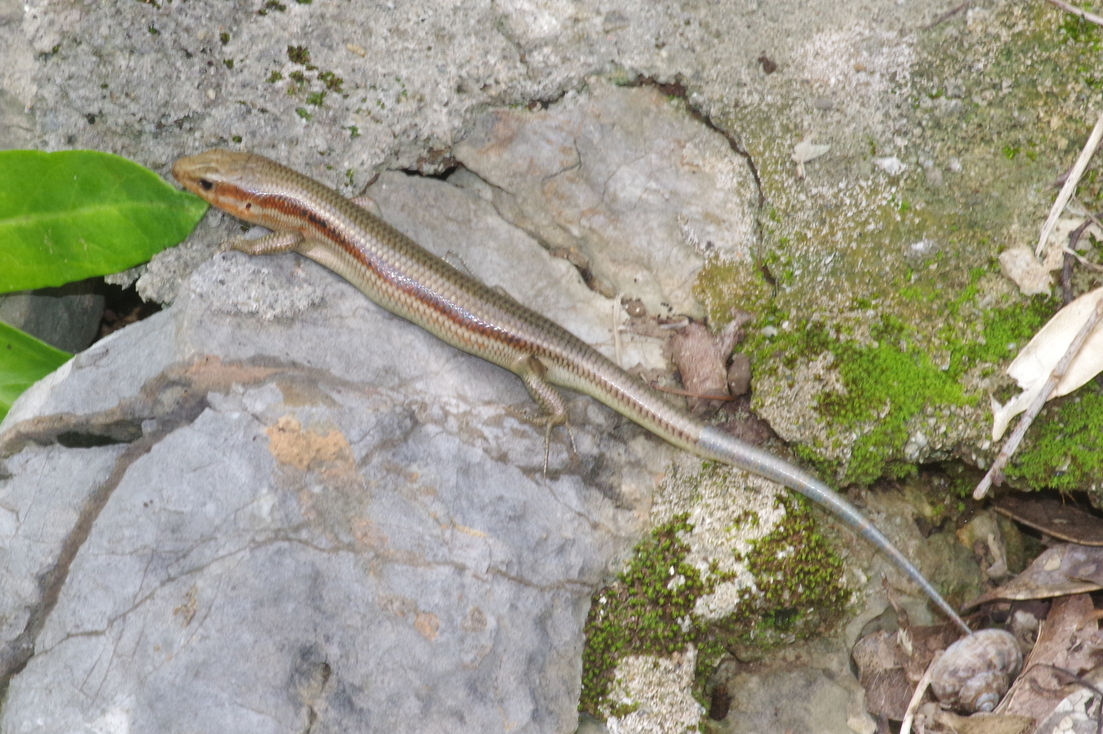

Conservation status
- Near Threatened (IUCN 3.1)

Scientific classification
- Kingdom: Animalia
- Phylum: Chordata
- Class: Reptilia
- Order: Squamata
- Family: Scincidae
- Genus: Plestiodon
- Species: P. marginatus

Binomial name
- Plestiodon marginatus Hallowell, 1861

Synonyms
- Eumeces marginatus (Hallowell, 1861)

= Plestiodon marginatus =

Species of reptile

Plestiodon marginatus, the Ousima skink or Okinawa blue-tailed skink, is a species of skink. It is endemic to the central (Okinawa Islands) and northern parts (Amami Islands, Tokara Islands) of the Ryukyu Islands (Japan).
