= Fernando Altamirano =

Mexican physician, botanist and naturalist

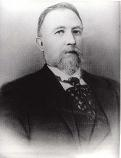
- Born: Fernando Altamirano; July 7, 1848; Aculco, State of Mexico, Mexico
- Died: October 7, 1908 (aged 60); Villa Guadalupe, Mexico City, Mexico
- Education: National School of Medicine, Mexico
- Known for: Studies on pharmacology of Mexican plants
- Scientific career
- Fields: Pharmacology, Botany, Physiology
- Workplaces: Instituto Medico Nacional
- Author abbrev. (botany): Altam.

Fernando Altamirano (Fernando Altamirano-Carbajal) (July 7, 1848 – October 7, 1908) was a Mexican physician, botanist and naturalist. He was born in Aculco, studied in Querétaro, and died in Mexico City. Altamirano was the founder and the director of the Instituto Medico Nacional from 1888 to 1908.

He published more than 250 papers on pharmacology of Mexican plants and on physiology. He was also interested in the industrial uses of Mexican plants.

Altamirano collaborated with many internationally recognized botanists of the period, like Joseph Nelson Rose, Cyrus Pringle, George R. Shaw and Edward Janczewski.

At least one genus and nine species of plants and animals were named after him, many of them by Joseph Nelson Rose.

== Biography ==
Altamirano was son of Manuel Altamirano y Tellez and Micaela Carbajal, and had at least two full siblings: Federico (1849) and Alberto ( 1852). He had also seven half brothers and sisters: Delfina Altamirano y Monterde (1835), Etelvina Altamirano y Monterde (1837), Jose Altamirano y Monterde (1839), Eduardo Altamirano y Monterde (1840), Rafael Altamirano y Monterde (1841), Maria Lucia Altamirano y Ruiz (1857) and Maria Margarita Altamirano y Ruiz (1860).

Fernando was baptized in the parish of Aculco, State of Mexico, on July 9, 1848, with the full name of Fernando Guilebaldo Isabel Juan Jose Maria de Jesus Altamirano.

During his childhood, around 1850, he moved with his family to San Juan del Río, and three years after, to the city of Santiago de Querétaro, where he studied at the San Francisco Javier College, called years later the Civil College. By the end of 1861, at age thirteen, he had already lost his father and mother, so his education was mostly influenced by his grandfather, Manuel Altamirano, a physician and botanist, who introduced him to the botanic studies.

In 1868, Altamirano moved to Mexico City, where he studied at the newly opened National Preparatory School. A year later, he attended the National School of Medicine, Mexico, where he finished his studies in 1873. That same year, he entered the Academy of Medicine, which would be renamed a few years later as a National Academy of Medicine of Mexico. He also joined the Mexican Society of Natural History.

On November 9, 1873, Altamirano married Luisa Gonzalez, in the city of Santiago de Querétaro. Fernando and Luisa soon returned to Mexico City, where they had at least ten children, among them José Maria (1874) Josefa (1877), Rafael (1879), Fernando (1881), Luisa (1881), Maria (1883), José Ignacio (1885) Alberto (1886), Carlos (1886), and Jose Salvador (1890).

Initially, Altamirano worked as a temporary assistant in the departments of pharmacy, pharmacology and drug history at the National School of Medicine, Mexico. In 1876, he published the catalog of indigenous natural products submitted by the Mexican Society of Natural History to the Centennial International Exhibition in Philadelphia, in 1876. In 1877, he was employed as pharmacist, or preparer of medications, and in 1878 obtained the degree of professor in the School of Medicine. He continued as a pharmacist and as a professor of pharmacology and physiology, but also as an interim professor of therapeutic, topographic anatomy and gynecology. In addition, he worked as a physician in the Hospital of San Andres and in private practice. In the same period, he published several articles in the Medical Gazette of Mexico and in the journal of the Mexican Society of History Natural.

In 1888, Altamirano was appointed as the first director of the National Medical Institute of Mexico. He held this position until his death. There, he installed the first laboratory of physiology in Mexico. During this period, he also made numerous trips of medical botany to different regions of the country, some in the company of internationally renowned botanists as Joseph Nelson Rose, Cyrus Pringle and George Russell Shaw. Additionally, Altamirano conducted numerous investigations, reported on the two journals of the institute: El Estudio and Anales del Instituto Médico Nacional. On the other hand, he was responsible for the institute's involvement in the Exposition Universelle (1889), held in Paris, and in the 1904 Louisiana Purchase Exposition, held in St. Louis, Missouri, and participated in several international conferences, such as the Ninth International Congress of Hygiene and Demography, held in Madrid from 10 to 17 April 1898. He established links with leading scientific institutions in Europe, U.S. and Latin America.

He was alderman in Mexico City in 1897, and in Villa Guadalupe on several occasions.

He died on October 7, 1908, at his home in Villa Guadalupe, Mexico City, due to an internal bleeding, resulted from a ruptured abdominal aortic aneurysm. He was buried in the Pantheon of Tepeyac in the same city.

== Scientific contributions ==
Altamirano registered for the first time the cholinergic activity of seeds of the colorin tree (Erythrina coralloides), an activity that he suggested was due to the presence of an unknown alkaloid, which he called erythroidine. He conducted studies on the properties of the erythrina coralloides with Manuel Dominguez in 1877, and individually in 1888. Erythroidine was completely isolated until 1937 by Karl Folkers and Randolph T. Majors.

In 1878, Altamirano published his thesis for the degree of professor, entitled Contribution to the Study of National Pharmacology: Medicinal Indigenous Legumes whose illustrations were drawn by his friend, the painter José María Velasco Gómez.

In 1894, along with José Ramírez, Altamirano wrote an advanced report on environmental remediation, entitled: List of botanical and common names of trees and shrubs to repopulate the forests of the Republic, accompanied by an indication of the climates where they grow and how to propagate them.

He investigated and isolate the plumbagin from the Plumbago pulchella. His work in this topic, carried out with the support of Dr. Manuel Toussaint-Vargas, was included in the first part of the "Data for Mexican Materia Medica" in 1894. He identified this active principle as a substance composed of acicular, yellow, intergrown crystals that formed fluffy and light masses; and he mentioned that it could be used to destroy malignant tumors, to counteract toothaches, and as a revulsive.

Moreover, in 1895, he discovered a species of axolotl not known before in the mountains around Mexico City. He sent a specimen to the French zoologist Alfredo Dugès, at that time living in Guanajuato, who identified this axolotl as a member of a new species, and named it Ambystoma altamirani, in honor of Altamirano. The next year, he published an interesting article entitled Natural History Applied to Ancient Mexicans.

Afterwards, he translated from Latin to Spanish the work of Francisco Hernández de Toledo on plants of New Spain. In addition, in 1898, he obtained a copy of the manuscripts written by José Mariano Mociño, which remained in Europe.

In 1904, Altamirano presented the book Materia Medica Mexicana: a manual of Mexican medicinal herbs for the Louisiana Purchase Exposition, held in St. Louis, Missouri. This book was based on the numerous studies published in the "Data for Mexican Materia Medica" by the National Medical Institute, in which he contributed significantly.

One year later, in 1905, Altamirano and Joseph Nelson Rose described a euphorbiaceae from the states of Guanajuato, Querétaro and Michoacán, locally called palo amarillo. They considered it a new species and named it Euphorbia elastica, although now it also known as Euphorbia fulva. Altamirano was interested in this euphorbiaceae due to its elastic resin content, which he hoped could be profitably converted into commercial rubber, as had been previously done with guayule in northern Mexico. In the National Medical Institute, he and his colleagues conducted several studies with the palo amarillo until 1908, but they could not get commercial rubber extracted from it in a profitable way.

== Genus and species named after Fernando Altamirano ==
- Altamiranoa (Rose, 1903)
- Eryngium altamiranoi (Hemsl. & Rose, 1906)
- Pinus altamiranoi (Shaw in Sargent, 1905)
- Bumelia altamiranoi (Rose & Standl., 1924)
- Leucophyllum altamiranii (Urbina, 1906)
- Ribes altamirani (Janczewski, 1906)
- Mesoscincus altamirani (Dugés, 1891)
- Ambystoma altamirani (Dugés, 1895)

== Species named by Fernando Altamirano ==
- Euphorbia elastica (Altam. & Rose, 1905)
