= Aculco =

- Municipality
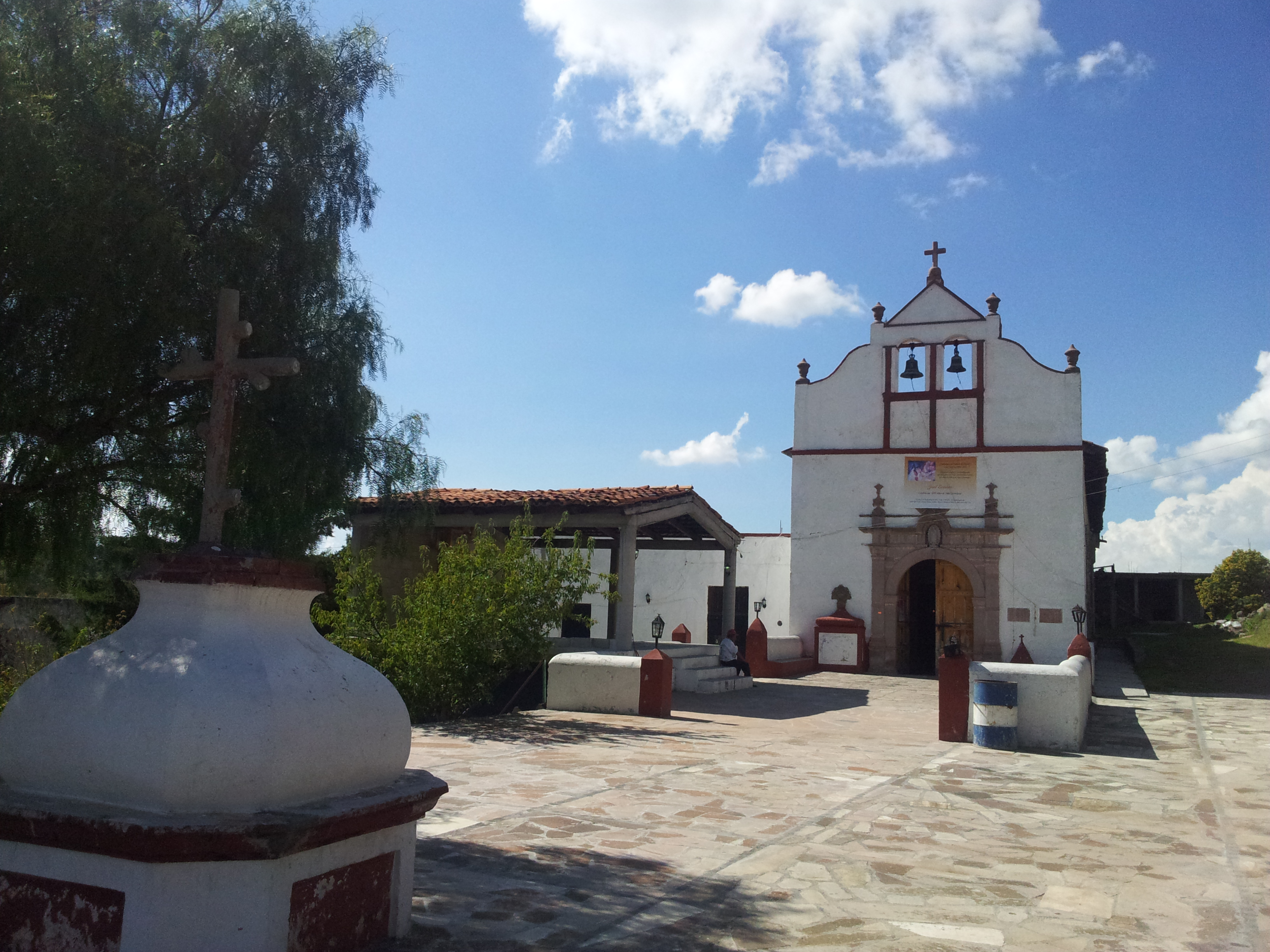
- Lord of the Pasito Church

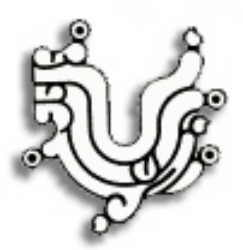
- Coat of arms

- Aculco municipality

- Location within Mexico
- Coordinates: 20°05′54″N 99°49′37″W
- Country: Mexico
- State: State of Mexico
- Region: Atlacomulco Region
- Municipal seat: Aculco de Espinoza
- Municipal status: 1825

Government
  - Municipal President: Jorge Alfredo Osornio Victoria (2019–2021)

Area
  - Municipality: 465.7 km^{2} (179.8 sq mi)
- Elevation (of seat): 2,450 m (8,040 ft)

Population (2010) Municipality
  - Municipality: 44,823
  - Seat: 1,624
- Time zone: UTC-6 (Central)
- Postal code (of seat): 50360

UNESCO World Heritage Site
- Official name: Town of Aculco, Camino Real de Tierra Adentro
- Type: Cultural
- Criteria: II, IV
- Designated: 2010 (34th session)
- Reference no.: 1351
- Region: Latin America and the Caribbean

Aculco is a municipality located in the Atlacomulco Region of the State of Mexico in Mexico. The name comes from Nahuatl. The municipal seat is the town of Aculco de Espinoza, although both the town and municipality are commonly referred to as simply "San Jerónimo Aculco".

The municipality is 110 kilometers away from Mexico City, and is known for its artisans and cheeses, according to El Heraldo. Aculco currently has a population of over 44,823 inhabitants. The mayor or municipal president of Aculco is Jorge Alfredo Osnornio.

== History ==
Aculco was founded approximately in 1110 AD by the Otomies, despite the fact that its name comes from Nahuatl. After being a village inhabited by Otomies for long time, it became a region dominated by the Mexicas, who lived there many years before the founding of Tenochtitlan.

With the arrival of the Spanish in 1540, construction on the church and the convent of San Jeronimo began. In November 1810, Miguel Hidalgo and his contingent, who began the Mexican War of Independence, arrived in the region. Aculco was also where insurgents, led by Don Miguel Hidalgo, lost a battle against the troops of Felix Ma. Calleja.

During the nineteenth century, the town hall and the first primary school in the region were constructed. Public baths and a municipal pool were also built.

On February 19, 1825, it became a municipality. In 1914 and 1915, Aculco was the scene of clashes led by the revolutionaries’ carrancistas, villistas and Zapatistas.

== Geography ==
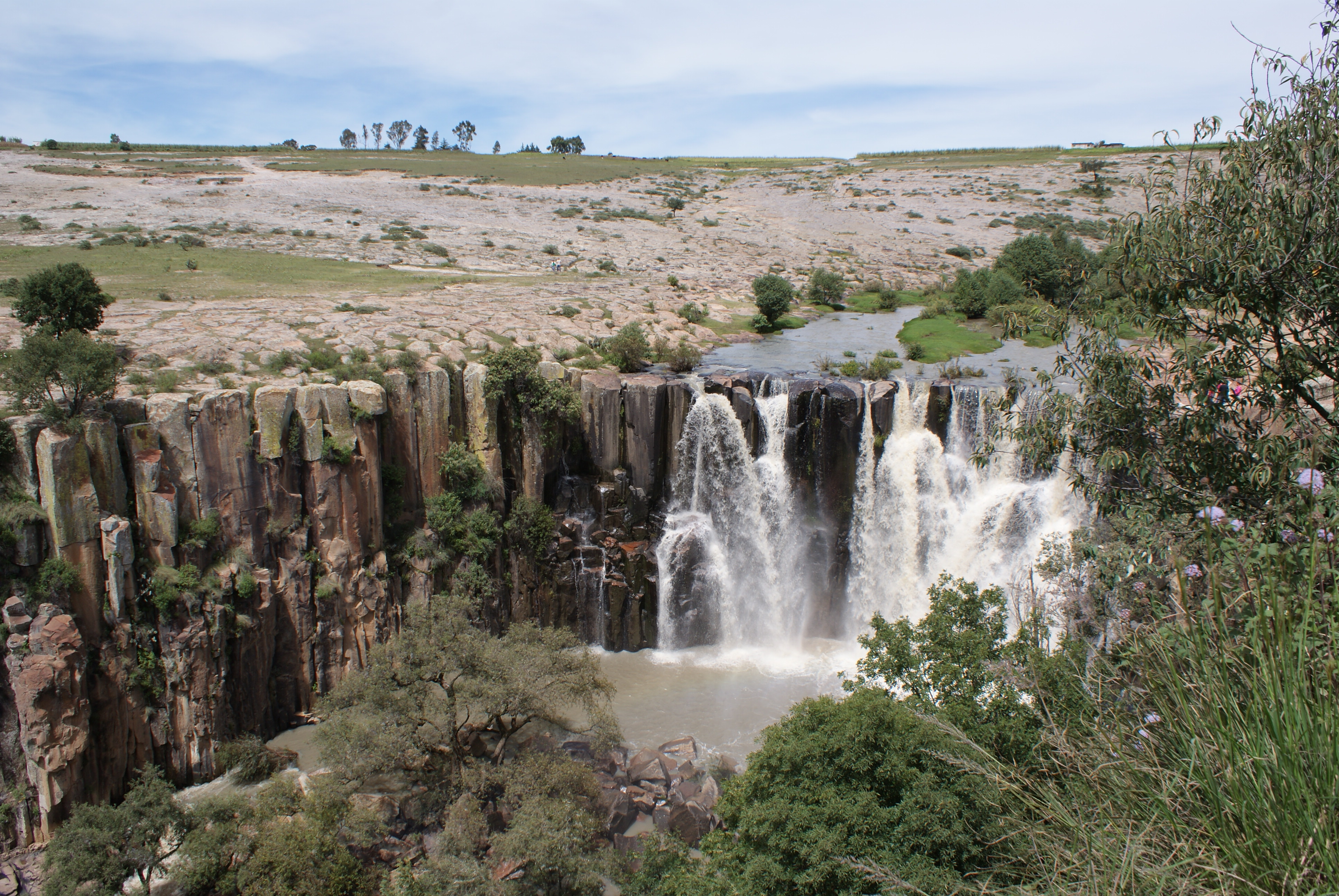
Concepción waterfall.

The municipality of Aculco has a geographical extent of 484.7 square kilometres (187.1 sq mi). That represents 2.18% of Mexico State, of which it is a part of. Aculco borders Polotitlán in the north, Querétaro in the south, and Acambay and Timilpan in the south. It is approximately 100 kilometers away from or over 1 hour from Toluca, Toluca.

=== Climate ===
Aculco has a relatively cool, humid climate, with rain in the summer. The annual average temperature is of 13.2 °C (55.8 °F), with the lowest temperature occurring in the winter. The rain season starts at the end of March or beginning of April and lasts until October or November.

Climate data for Aculco (1991–2020 normals, extremes 1961–present)
Month	Jan	Feb	Mar	Apr	May	Jun	Jul	Aug	Sep	Oct	Nov	Dec	Year
Record high °C (°F)	28 (82)	28 (82)	30 (86)	31 (88)	35 (95)	31 (88)	29 (84)	28 (82)	28 (82)	27.5 (81.5)	25.5 (77.9)	30 (86)	35 (95)
Mean daily maximum °C (°F)	19.3 (66.7)	21.2 (70.2)	23.3 (73.9)	25.0 (77.0)	25.0 (77.0)	23.0 (73.4)	21.4 (70.5)	21.4 (70.5)	20.6 (69.1)	20.5 (68.9)	19.9 (67.8)	19.9 (67.8)	21.7 (71.1)
Daily mean °C (°F)	11.1 (52.0)	12.7 (54.9)	14.5 (58.1)	16.5 (61.7)	17.1 (62.8)	16.4 (61.5)	15.5 (59.9)	15.4 (59.7)	14.9 (58.8)	13.8 (56.8)	12.4 (54.3)	11.6 (52.9)	14.3 (57.7)
Mean daily minimum °C (°F)	3.0 (37.4)	4.2 (39.6)	5.8 (42.4)	8.0 (46.4)	9.2 (48.6)	9.8 (49.6)	9.5 (49.1)	9.4 (48.9)	9.2 (48.6)	7.1 (44.8)	4.8 (40.6)	3.4 (38.1)	7.0 (44.6)
Record low °C (°F)	−5.5 (22.1)	−7 (19)	−6 (21)	0.8 (33.4)	2 (36)	2 (36)	1 (34)	0.5 (32.9)	−1 (30)	−3 (27)	−5 (23)	−7 (19)	−7 (19)
Average precipitation mm (inches)	10.6 (0.42)	9.1 (0.36)	13.1 (0.52)	18.8 (0.74)	56.5 (2.22)	122.4 (4.82)	143.9 (5.67)	110.0 (4.33)	126.6 (4.98)	55.5 (2.19)	24.1 (0.95)	4.4 (0.17)	695.0 (27.36)
Average precipitation days (≥ 0.01 mm)	3.0	2.4	3.2	5.0	9.9	13.2	16.3	14.4	13.9	8.9	4.6	1.5	96.3
Source: Servicio Meteorológico Nacional

=== Flora and fauna ===
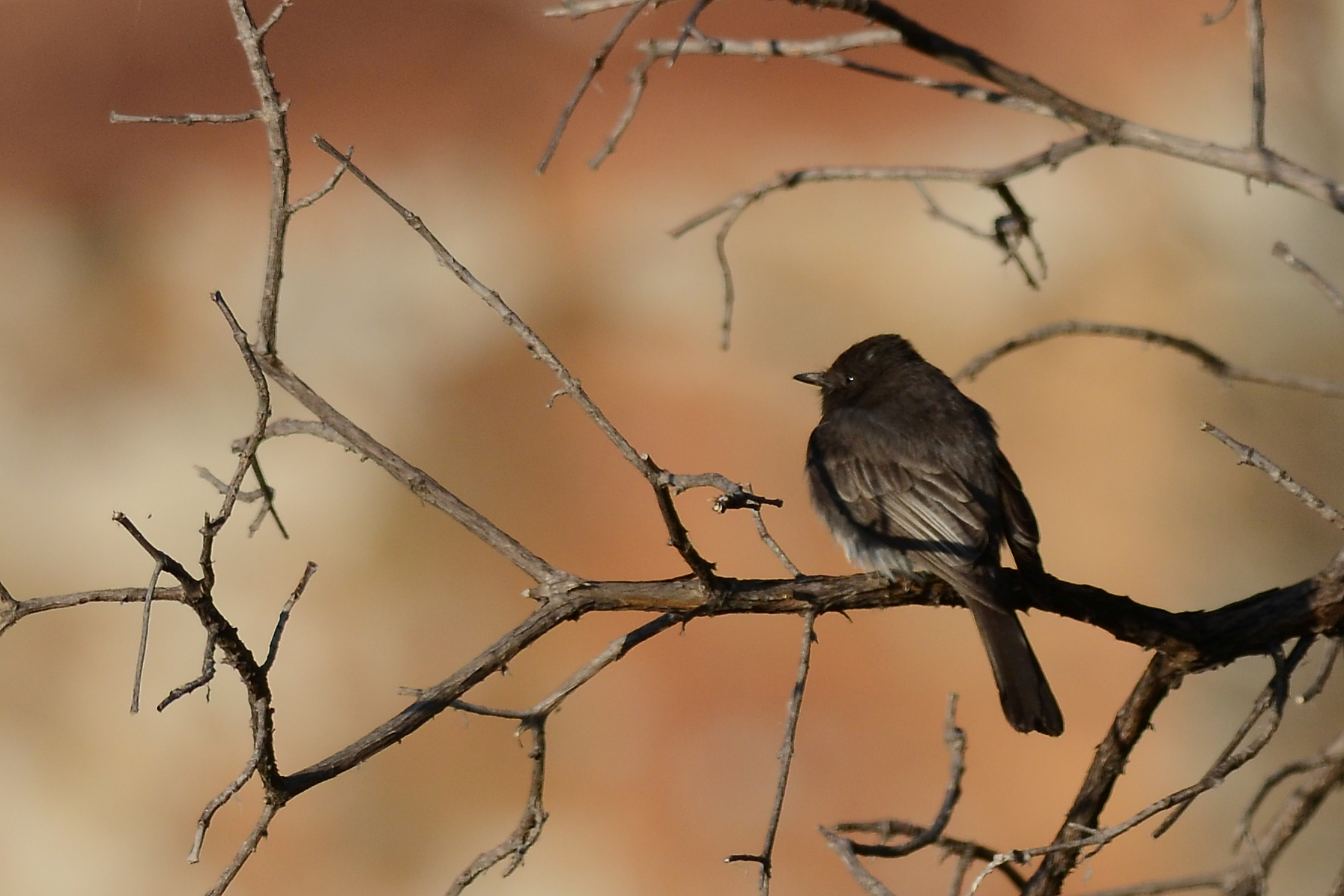
Black phoebe, a native bird.

There is a diversity in plants and animals of temperate climate and semi-arid climate (Mezquital Valley).

Native animals include: cacomistle, skunk, gopher, Virginia opossum, rabbit, Mexican gray squirrel, turkey, colibri, turkey vulture, northern mockingbird, rattlesnake, pine snake, black phoebe, rufous-crowned sparrow, great horned owl, axolotl, frog, toad, red ant, bee, and others.

== Politics ==
=== Mayors ===
Sworn in to the role on December 13, 2018, Aculco Jorge Alfredo Osornio Victoria will remain president until 2021. He was previously a member of the Institutional Revolutionary Party.

Mayor	Time
Vicente Sosa Alcántara	2000-2003
Jesús Alejandro Aguilar Sánchez	2003-2006
Francisco Javier Venancio Ramirez	2006-2009
Marcos Javier Sosa Alcantara	2009-2012
Salvador del Rio Martínez	2013-2015
Aurora González Ledezma	2016-2018
Jorge Alfredo Osornio Victoria	2019-2021

== Economy ==
The main economic activity of Aculco is the ranching of animals like pigs and sheep. The municipality's principal products include milk, fur, wool and egg. Aculco's inner commerce principally occurs at the municipal market, while its outer commerce is with Toluca, Mexico City and Querétaro.

Another major economic activity of Aculco is the exploitation of natural resources like sand, with quarries present in the region. The municipality is also home to a metal structure manufacturing company.

Aculco is famous for the dairy products it produces. In 2019, Aculco has about 60 artisan workshops for cheese and dairy production.

=== Tourism ===
Aculco contains a number of notable geographic features. Two cascades are located in the area: "Tixhiñu" and "la Concepción". Rivers including the Río Ñadó and Río Prieto also flow through the municipality.

Aculco is home to numerous historic sites, including the San Jerónimo and the "Garrido Varela" bullring, as well as the former residence of Miguel Hidalgo y Costilla. Two busts are located in Aculco in the memory of Benito Juarez and Miguel Hidalgo.

== Demographics ==
According to INEGI, in 2005, Aculco has a population of over 40,000. The ethnic composition is mainly Otomi.

Over 16,000 people in the region are illiterate.

=== Communities belonging to the municipality ===
Large Town	2010 Census Population
Total	44 823
San Lucas Totolmaloya	3 770
San Jerónimo Barrio	2 322
Gunyo Poniente	2 138
Aculco de Espinoza	1 823
San Pedro Danxhi	1 119
Decandeje	
Ñadó Buenavista	
Cieneguilla de González	
Arroyo Zarco	

Other communities include:

- Arroyo Zarco
- Arroyo Zarco Ejido
- Ñado Buenavista
- Bañe
- Bimbo
- Decandeje
- Ejido de Santa María Nativitas
- Ejido de Totolopan
- Ejido Decandeje (Chapala Ejido Decandeje)
- Ejido las Ánimas
- Ejido San Joaquín Coscomatepec
- El Azafrán (Santa Rosa el Azafrán)
- El Bonxhi
- El Bosque
- El Colorado
- El Mogote
- El Rincón
- El Tixhiñu
- El Zethe (Jazmín)
- Encinillas Ejido
- Fondo
- Gunyo Oriente
- Gunyo Poniente (San José Gunyo)
- Higuerillas
- Huizachal
- Jurica
- La Cofradía Grande
- La Concepción Ejido
- La Concepción Pueblo
- La Cuesta
- La Esperanza
- La Estancia
- La Pera
- La Presita Segundo Cuartel
- La Soledad Barrio
- La Soledad Ejido
- Las Lajas
- Loma Alta Cabresteros
- Loma Alta Ejido Bañe (Bañe Barrio CONASUPO)
- Los Ailes
- Los Gavilanes
- Presa del Tepozán
- Rancho Chapala
- San Antonio Arroyo Zarco
- San Antonio el Zethe
- San Antonio Pueblo
- San Francisquito
- San Jerónimo Barrio
- San Jerónimo Ejido
- San Joaquín Coscomatepec
- San Lucas Totolmaloya
- San Martín Ejido
- San Pedro Denxhi
- Santa Ana Matlavat
- Santa Ana Oxtoc-toxhie
- Santa María Nativitas
- Santiago Oxtoc-Toxhie
- Taxtho

== Culture ==
The foundation of the Aculco municipality is celebrated on February 19. In March and April, the municipality holds a scenic performance of Semana Mayor that starts on Holy Thursday, in honor of Señor Nenthé. There is a festival to the Saint Patron Saint Jerome on September 30, including regional fairs, dances, and food.

== Notable people ==
- Fernando Altamirano (baptized 1848 in Aculco), physician, botanist and naturalist
- Mauro Máximo de Jesús (born 1957 in Aculco), - athlete
- Ignacio Espinoza Martínez
- Lucas Magos Bárcenas y Cornejo
- Alfonso Díaz de la Vega
- Pablo de San Antonio Indio
- Juan García, Juan Nicolás
- Sotero González Mena
- Juan Maldonado Chemiso
- José Rafael Polo
- José Trinidad Polo
- Manuel Polo

== See also ==
- Camino Real de Tierra Adentro
