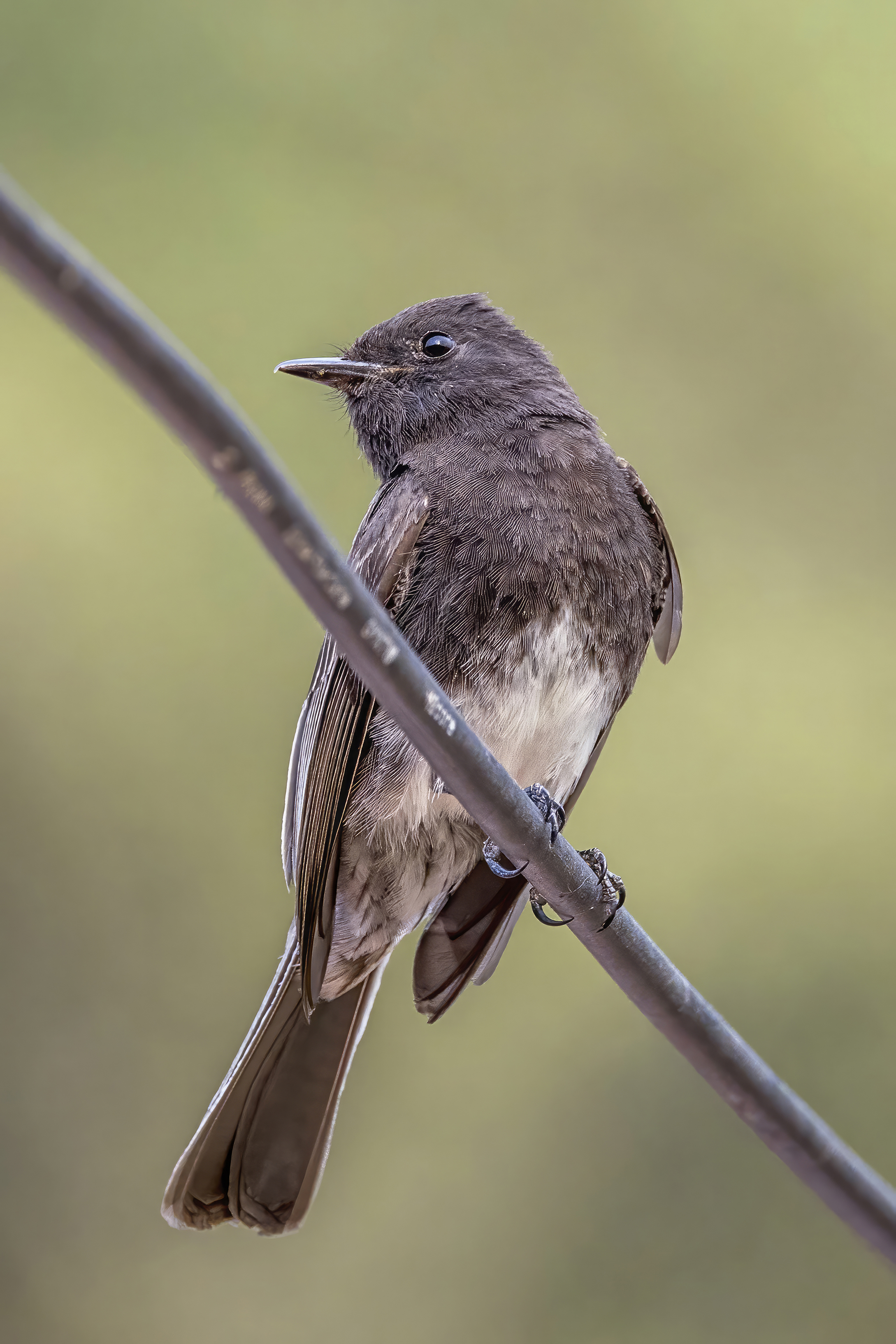

Conservation status
- Least Concern (IUCN 3.1)

Scientific classification
- Kingdom: Animalia
- Phylum: Chordata
- Class: Aves
- Order: Passeriformes
- Family: Tyrannidae
- Genus: Sayornis
- Species: S. nigricans

Binomial name
- Sayornis nigricans (Swainson, 1827)

Audio

= Black phoebe =

Species of bird in the tyrant-flycatcher family

The black phoebe (Sayornis nigricans) is a passerine bird in the tyrant-flycatcher family. It breeds from southwest Oregon and California south through Central and South America. It occurs year-round throughout most of its range and migrates less than the other birds in its genus though its northern populations are partially migratory. Six subspecies are commonly recognized although two are occasionally combined as a separate species, the white-winged phoebe.

The black phoebe has predominantly black plumage, with a white belly and undertail coverts. The sexes are identical in color, and juveniles have brown feather tips and brown wing-bars. Its song is a repeated tee-hee, tee ho. It lives in a variety of habitats but is always near water. It is mainly insectivorous and waits on a perch before sallying out and catching its prey in the air. It makes an open cup nest which is placed under a cliff or a bridge and cemented in its place with mud.

== Description ==
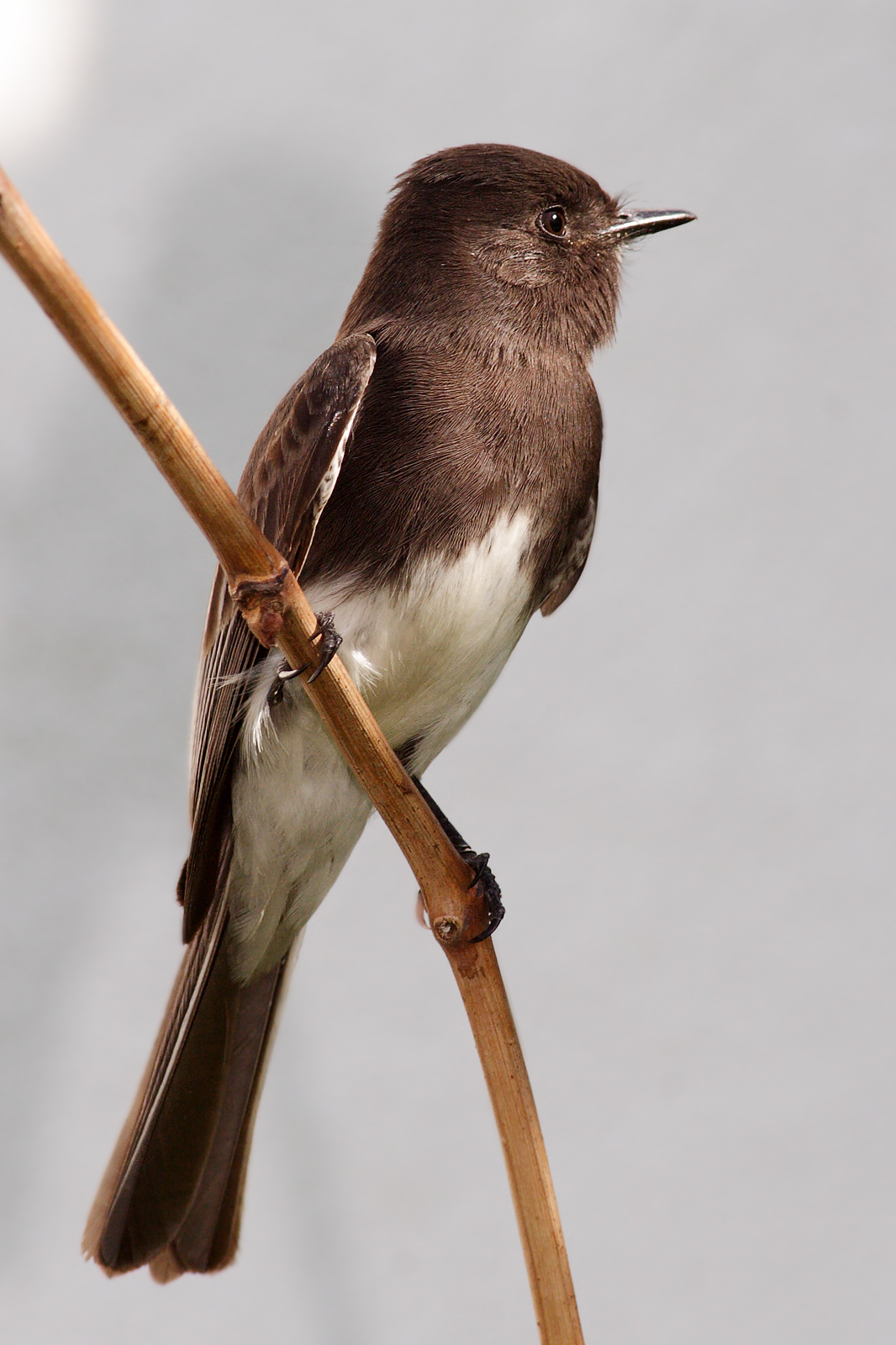
Juveniles have a browner plumage, which darkens into black as the bird ages

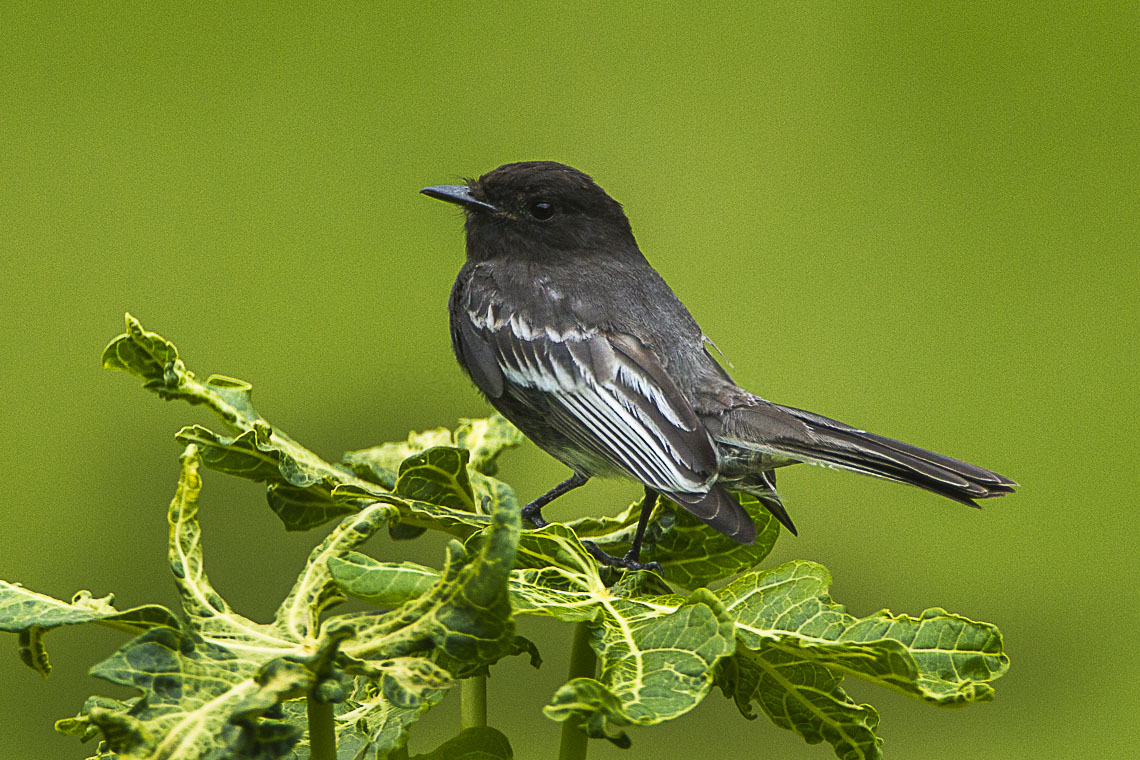
Black phoebe (white-winged)

The black phoebe is a medium-sized flycatcher, being 16 cm (6.3 in) in length and weighing 15 to 22 g (0.5 to 0.8 oz). It has predominantly black plumage, with white on its belly and undertail coverts. The white forms an inverted "V" in the lower breast. The sexes are identical and plumage does not vary seasonally. Juveniles have browner plumage, cinnamon-brown feather tips on their body, and brown wing-bars. The bird has brown irises and black legs, feet, and beak.

The phoebe can be recognized by a characteristic "tail-wagging" motion, in which the tail is lowered and the tail's feathers fanned out. It accomplishes almost all locomotion by flight, which is direct, with steady wing beats. Its song consists of two alternating phrases (tee-hee, tee-ho or sisee, sitsew). The song can be heard from both sexes, but is more commonly sung by males.

== Systematics ==
The phoebes are a genus, Sayornis, of birds in the tyrant flycatcher family. The flycatchers are the largest family of birds on earth, with over 400 known species. The genus name was given by George Robert Gray of the British Museum, and is named after Thomas Say, an American naturalist. The species name, nigricans, is Latin for "blackish", and was given by William Swainson in 1827.

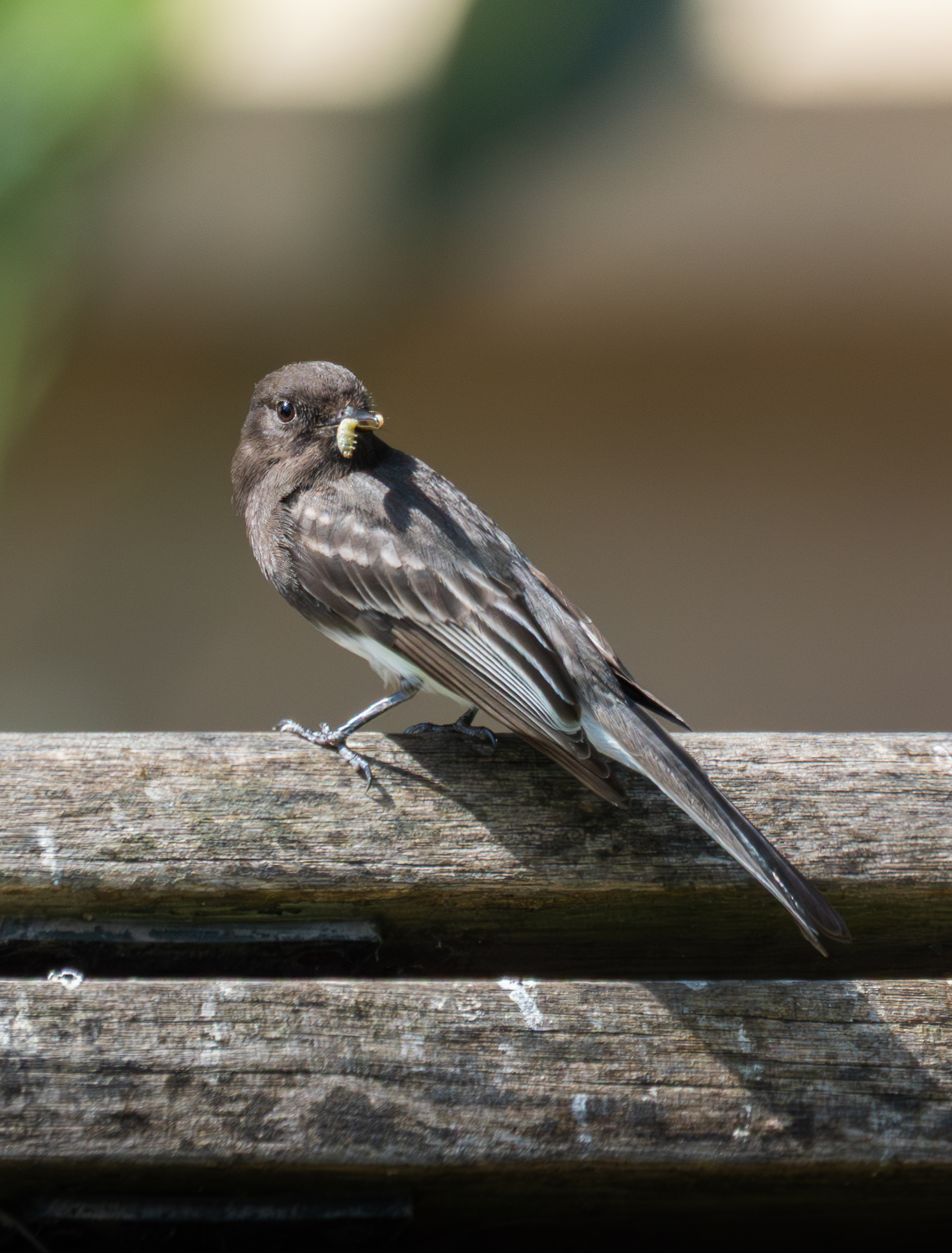
Black phoebe with grub

The black phoebe has six subspecies, but these can be divided into two groups which are sometimes considered to be separate species: the nigricans group (black phoebe) and the latirostris group (white-winged phoebe). The first group contains four subspecies, the second group two.

Subspecies	Range	Appearance
S. n. semiatra	Southwest United States to western Mexico, including Baja California.	Most white on belly of all subspecies; pale edging on wings and tail.
S. n. nigricans	Nominate subspecies; northeast, central, and southern Mexico.	Less white on belly than semiatra; white forms an inverted "U" instead of "V".
S. n. aquatica	Chiapas, Mexico, through Nicaragua.	White only on midbelly and vent.
S. n. amnicola	Costa Rica and Chiriquí Province, Panama.	Darkest subspecies; less white on abdomen.
S. n. angustirostris	Eastern Panama south through central Bolivia. Sometimes considered separate species with S. n. latirostris.	Extensive white edging on primary and tertial rectrices.
S. n. latirostris	Bolivia and northwest Argentina. Sometimes considered separate species with S. n. angustirostris.	Extensive white edging on rectrices and underwing lining.

== Distribution and habitat ==
The black phoebe breeds in the west and southwest United States, Mexico and Central America, and parts of South America. In Oregon it is found in river valleys on the Pacific coast, and in California on the western side of Coast Ranges. It breeds throughout the Colorado River valley and occasionally is found to the north in southern Nevada and southwestern Utah, as well as Arizona and central New Mexico. The black phoebe's breeding range in the United States extends as far southeast as the Lower Rio Grande Valley. In Central America it breeds on Baja California, except for the central part of the peninsula, and on interior mainland Mexico southwest to Panama, excluding El Salvador. In South America it is found in the coastal mountains of Venezuela, through Colombia, Ecuador, and Peru, to western Bolivia and northwestern Argentina.

It lives year-round in most of its range and is more sedentary (non-migratory) than either of the other phoebes in its genus (Eastern or Say's), although northern populations may be partially migratory. It is always found near water and is often found at coastal cliffs, river/lake banks, or even park fountains. Habitats must also include a supply of mud for nest building, and the birds' specialized nesting requirements probably cause their somewhat irregular range.
