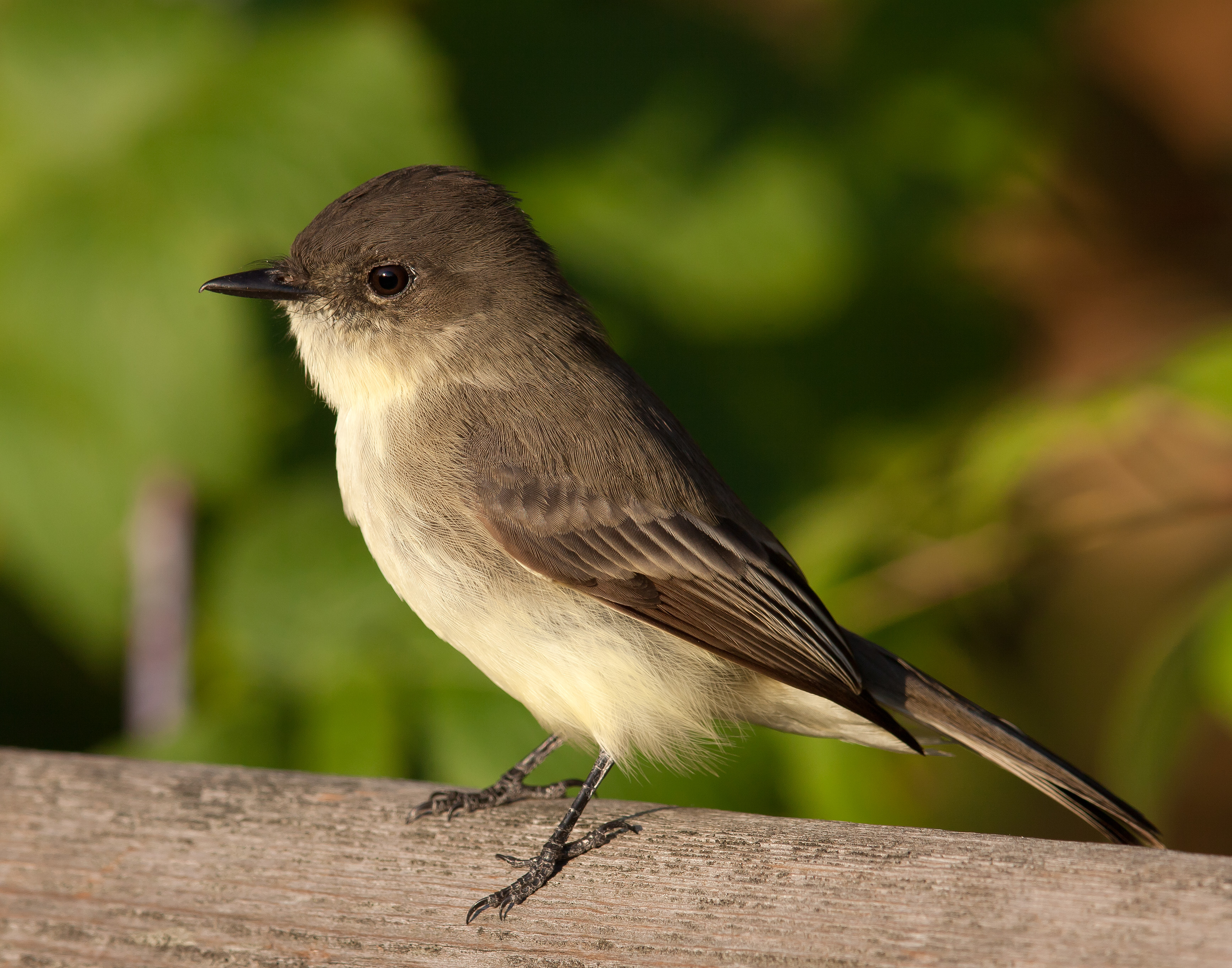
- Sayornis phoebe

Scientific classification
- Kingdom: Animalia
- Phylum: Chordata
- Class: Aves
- Order: Passeriformes
- Family: Tyrannidae
- Genus: Sayornis; Bonaparte, 1854

Type species
- Sayornis nigricans Bonaparte, 1854

Species
- See text.

= Sayornis =

Phoebes

Genus of birds

The genus Sayornis is a small group of medium-sized insect-eating birds, known as phoebes, in the tyrant flycatcher family Tyrannidae.

== Taxonomy ==
The genus Sayornis that was introduced by the French naturalist Charles Lucien Bonaparte in 1854 with black phoebe (Sayornis nigricans) as the type species. The genus name is constructed from the specific part of Bonaparte's name for Say's phoebe, Muscicapa saya, and Ancient Greek ornis meaning "bird". The English Phoebe is a name for the Roman moon-goddess Diana. A large molecular phylogenetic study of the tyrant flycatcher family published in 2020 found that Sayornis was sister to the genus Empidonax.

== Description and ecology ==
They are native to North and South America.

They prefer semi-open or open areas near water. These birds wait on a perch and then catch insects, usually in pairs. Their nest is an open cup sometimes placed on man-made structures. They aren't fond of dense forests, and prefer low perches.

They often slowly lower and raise their tails while perched.

=== Species ===
The genus contains three species:

Image	Scientific name	Common name	Distribution
	Sayornis phoebe	Eastern phoebe	Eastern North America
	Sayornis nigricans	Black phoebe	United States, Mexico and Central America, and parts of South America
	Sayornis saya	Say's phoebe	United States and Canada
