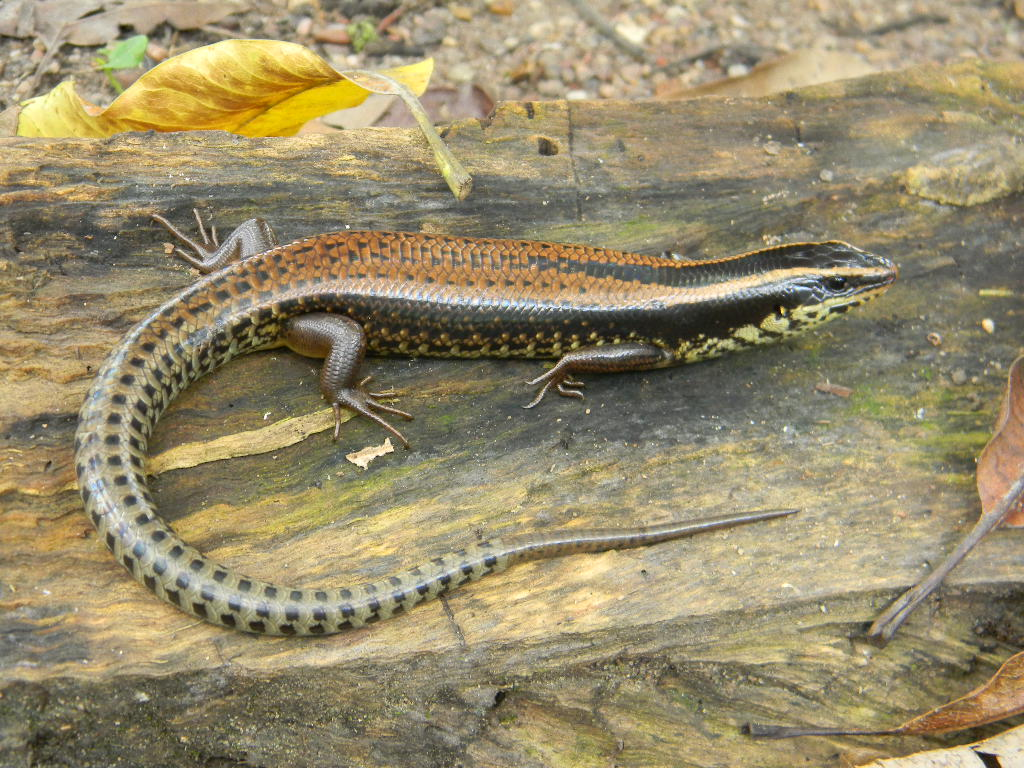

Conservation status
- Least Concern (IUCN 3.1)

Scientific classification
- Kingdom: Animalia
- Phylum: Chordata
- Class: Reptilia
- Order: Squamata
- Family: Scincidae
- Genus: Mesoscincus
- Species: M. schwartzei

Binomial name
- Mesoscincus schwartzei (Fischer, 1884)
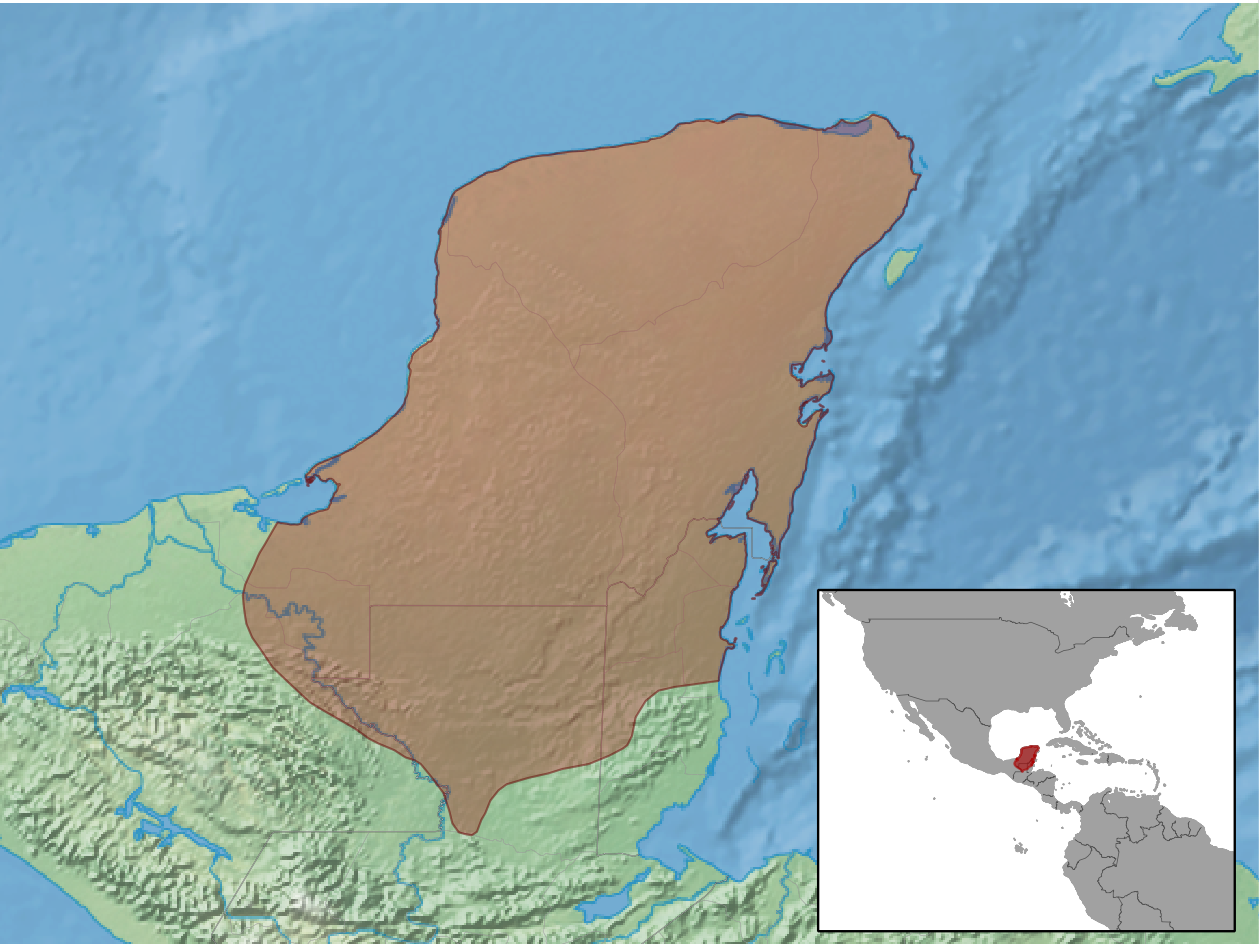

= Mesoscincus schwartzei =

Species of skink

The Mayan black-headed skink or Schwartze's skink (Mesoscincus schwartzei) is an extant species of skink, a lizard in the family Scincidae. The species is found in Mexico, Belize, and Guatemala.

== Etymology ==
The specific name, schwartzei, is in honor of "Dr. E. W. E. Schwartze" who was associated with the zoo in Hamburg, Germany. This probably refers to Erich Wilhelm Edmund Schwartze (1810–1885).
