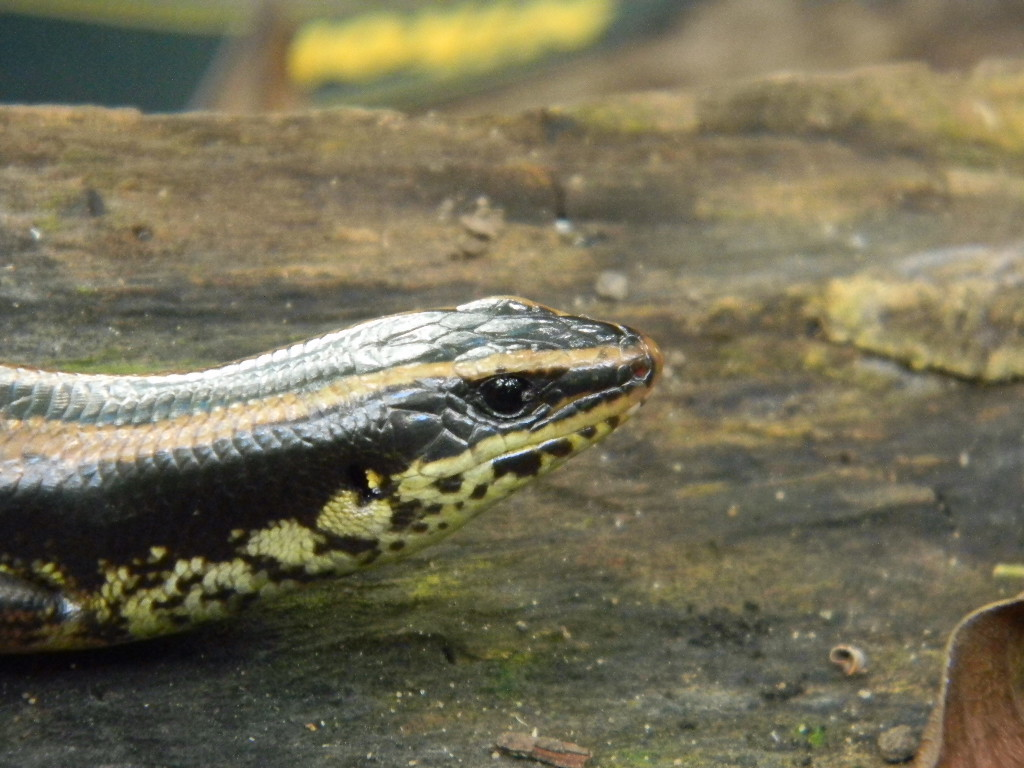
- Mesoscincus schwartzei

Scientific classification
- Kingdom: Animalia
- Phylum: Chordata
- Class: Reptilia
- Order: Squamata
- Suborder: Scinciformata
- Infraorder: Scincomorpha
- Family: Scincidae
- Genus: Mesoscincus; Griffith, Ngo & Murphy, 2000

= Mesoscincus =

Genus of lizards

Mesoscincus is a genus of lizards, comprising three species of skinks native to Mexico and Central America. The species were formerly included in the genus Eumeces.

== Species ==
- Mesoscincus altamirani (Dugès, 1891) – Tepalcatepec skink – Mexico
- Mesoscincus managuae (Dunn, 1933) – Managua skink – Costa Rica, Nicaragua, Honduras, Guatemala and El Salvador
- Mesoscincus schwartzei (Fischer, 1884) – Mayan black-headed skink, Schwartze's skink – Mexico, Guatemala, and Belize

Nota bene: A binomial authority in parentheses indicates that the species was originally described in a genus other than Mesoscincus.
