= Aculco de Espinoza =

Aculco de Espinoza Ndamëje (in Otomi) San Jerónmio Aculco
- Municipal Seat
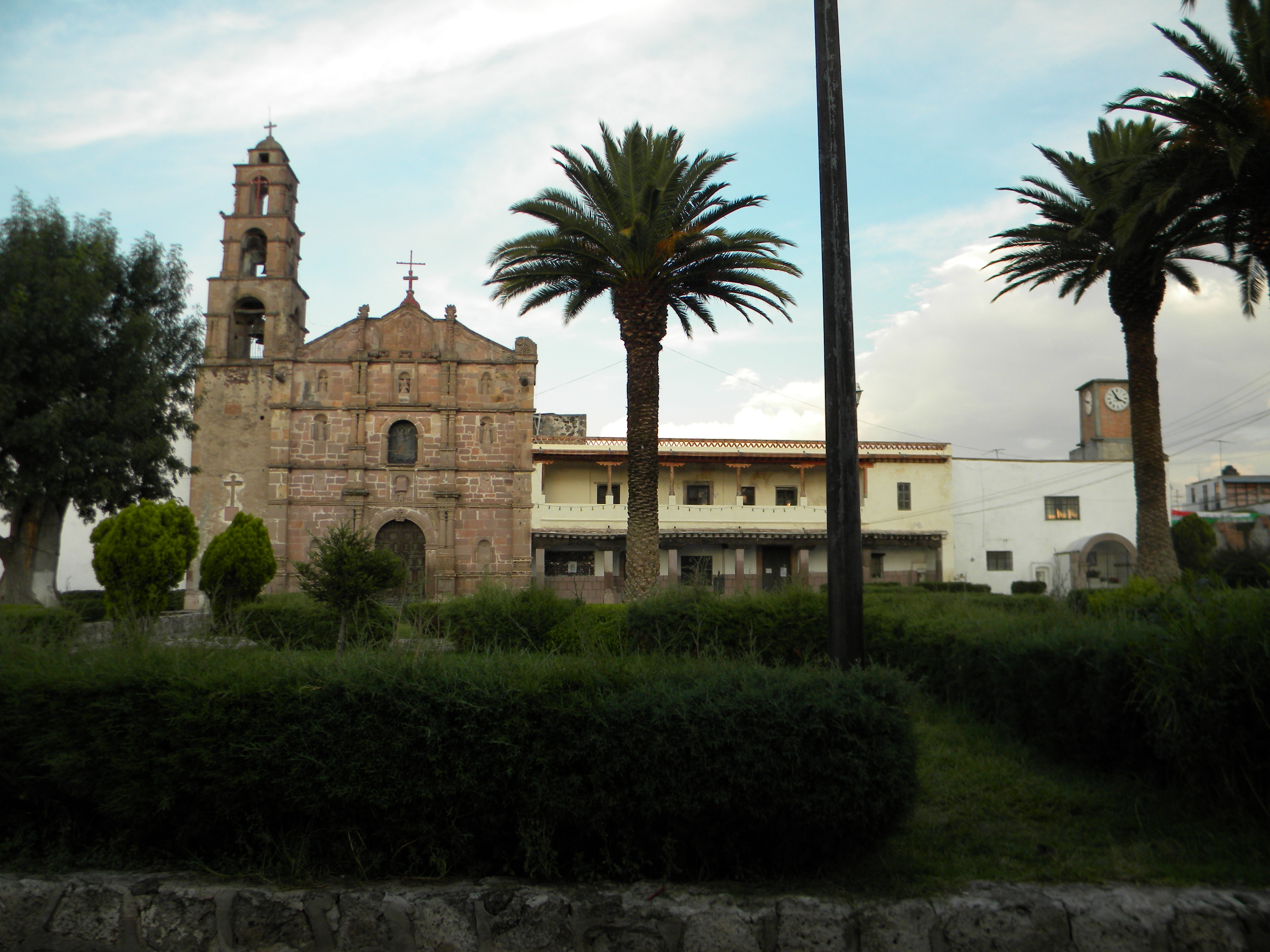
- Templo de san Jeronimo

- Location within Mexico
- Coordinates: 20°5′54″N 99°49′37″W
- Country: Mexico
- State: Mexico
- Municipality: Aculco
- Elevation: 2,596 m (8,517 ft)

Population (2010)
  - Total: 1,823
- Time zone: UTC-6 (Central Standard Time)
- Postal code (of seat): 50360
- INEGI code: 1500030001

Aculco de Espinoza or San Jerónimo Aculco (Acolco in Nahuatl and Ndamëje in Otomi) is a town and municipal seat of the Aculco Municipality, State of Mexico in Mexico.

The town is located on the Camino Real de Tierra Adentro, trade were collectively added to the World Heritage List. In 2015, Aculco de Espinoza was declared a Pueblo Mágico by the Enrique Peña Nieto's government.

== Etymology ==
The name Acolco comes from Nahuatl language. It has been interpreted to mean “place where twist the river arms,” The arm is atl (water) and coltic (bent), de lastname “Espinoza” was added to the name by the municipality government of in 1954 in honor of Ignacio Espinosa, a Mexican philanthropist born in this town.

== Geography ==
Aculco de Espinoza lies in the north of the state of Mexico. The town of Aculco de Espinoza is the municipal seat and urban place most populated in the Aculco municipality. The town is divided in barrios (neighborhoods) and ejidos.

The River Ñadó is big river that crossing by Acolco de Espinoza and connect with natural rivers to its southeast is the state of Querétaro. This same cross the urban place, is using for irrigation growing lands.

The municipal seat is on a small hill named Bonxi, the most high point is Cerro El Ñadó (Ñado Mountain), a forest place on the west to Aculco de Espinoza.

== Culture ==
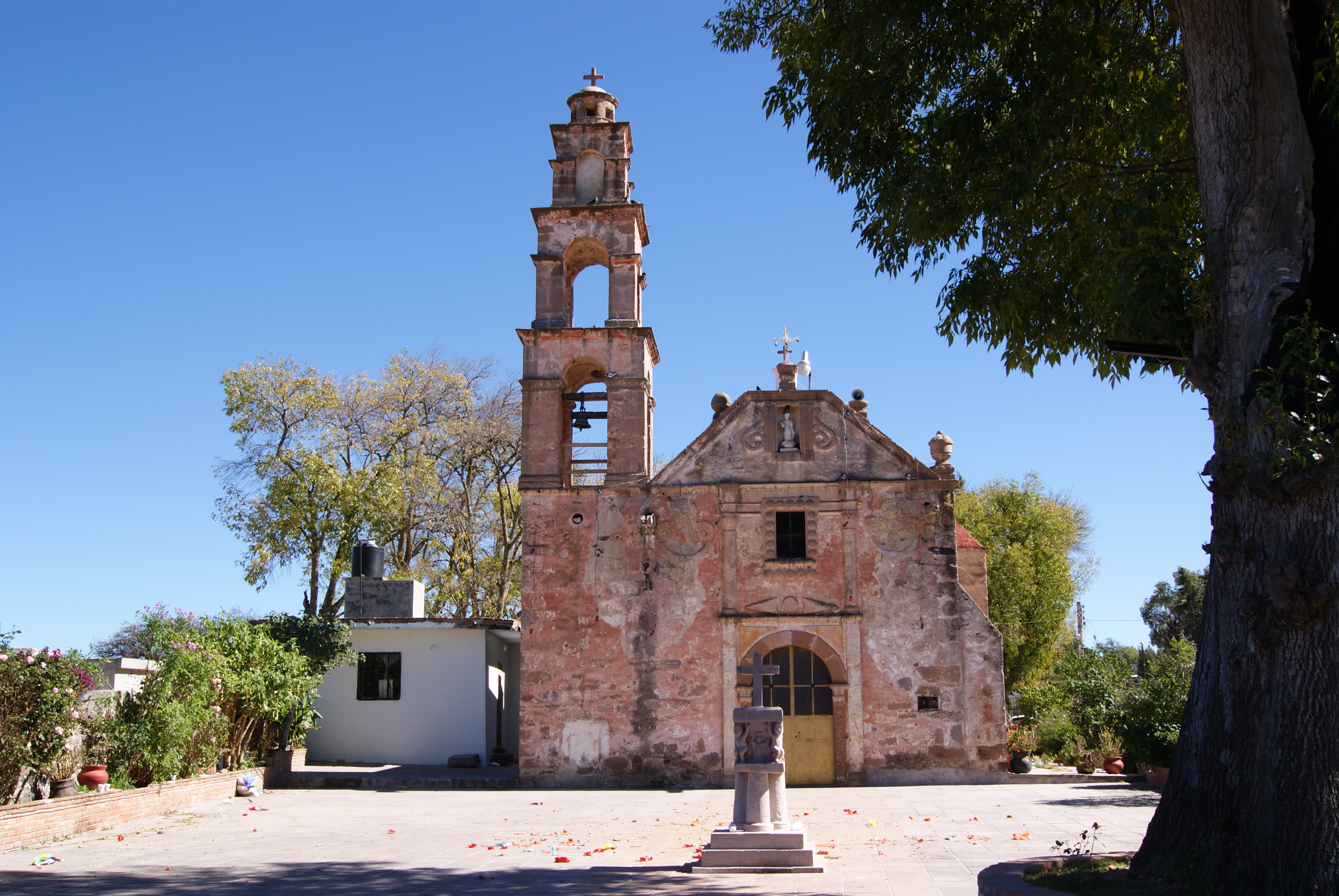
Atrium.

San Jerome Parish and ex-convent is the monument most important at the town of Aculco de Espinoza, is a building with Baroque architecture.

=== Cultural events ===
- February 2: Day of the Candelaria (Blessing of the Seeds)
- February 13: Anniversary of the Town's Foundation.
- March 3: Feast of the Holy Cross
- September 30: Town Fair, Feast of Patron Saint Saint Gerome.
- December 12: Procession of Our lady of Guadalupe
