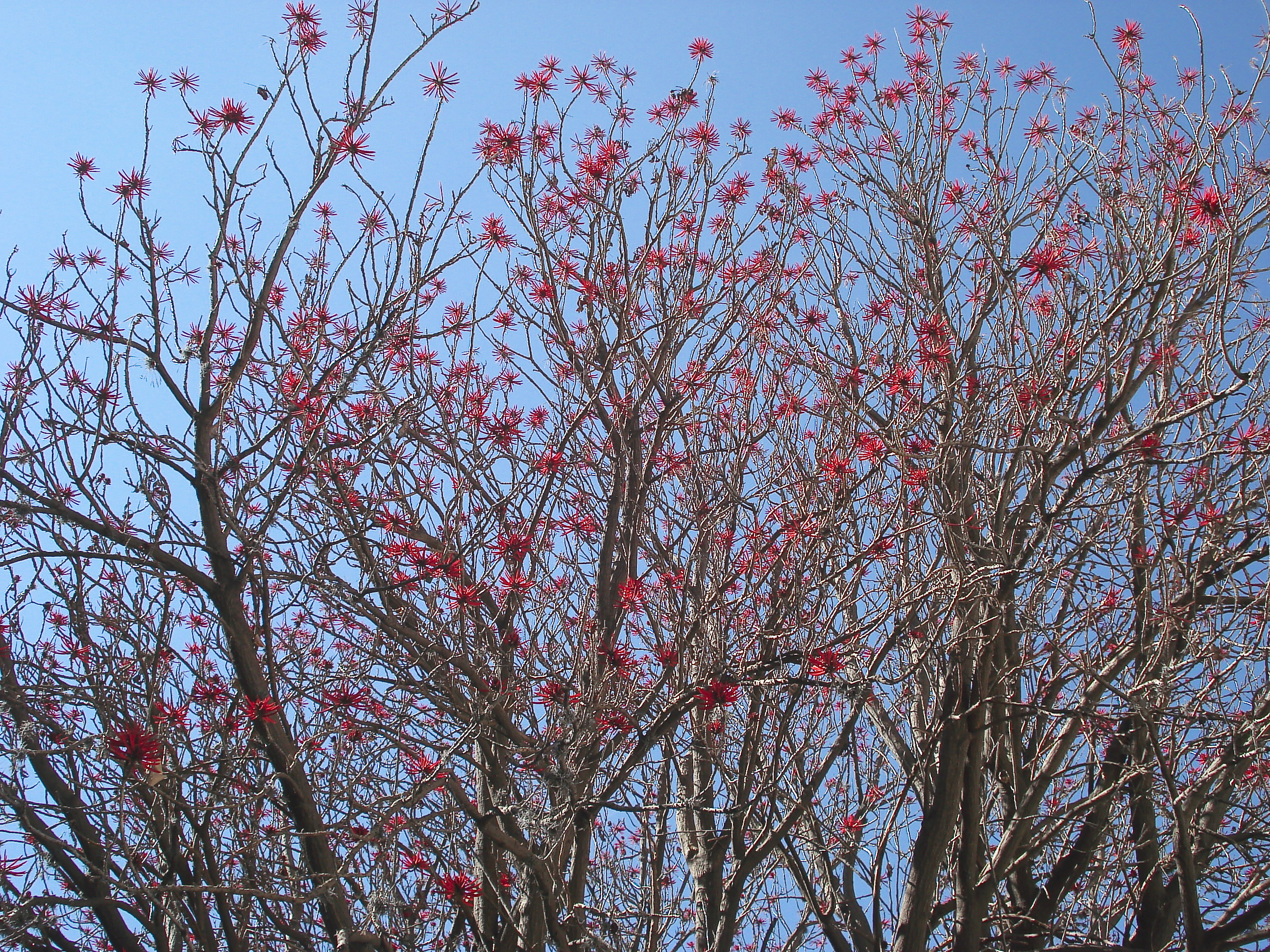

Scientific classification
- Kingdom: Plantae
- Clade: Embryophytes
- Clade: Tracheophytes
- Clade: Spermatophytes
- Clade: Angiosperms
- Clade: Eudicots
- Clade: Rosids
- Order: Fabales
- Family: Fabaceae
- Subfamily: Faboideae
- Genus: Erythrina
- Species: E. coralloides

Binomial name
- Erythrina coralloides DC.

= Erythrina coralloides =

Naked coral tree

Species of legume

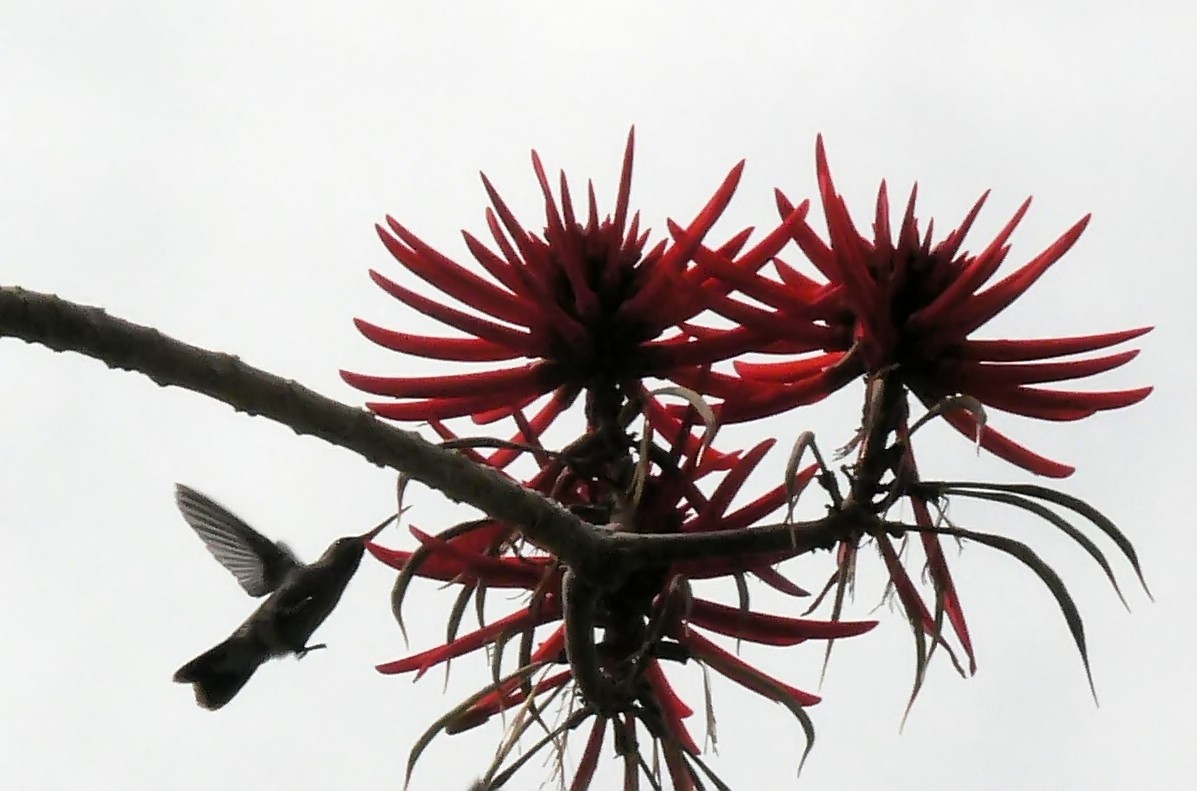
Erythrina coralloides with a hummingbird

Erythrina coralloides (flame coral tree, naked coral tree) is a species of flowering tree in the pea family, Fabaceae, that is native to eastern Mexico. It ranges from Tamaulipas south to Oaxaca, and some taxonomists believe it is also native to southern Arizona in the United States.

== Description ==
Erythrina coralloides is a tree reaching a height of 12 m. Its seeds are elliptic, smooth, glossy, coral-red, with a salient longitudinal line on the back, and with a white hilum surrounded by a black border.

== Uses ==
Its white wood is used for making bungs and, especially in San Luis Potosí, figurines. The clusters of red and white flowers on the Naked Coral Tree make it an attractive ornamental. The flowers are also used as a food source.

== Phytochemistry ==
The seeds are very poisonous, containing erythroidine, a powerful muscle relaxant; erythroresin, an emetic; coralin; and erythric acid. The extract has been suggested as a substitute for curare. An analysis by Rio de la Loza showed the seeds contain 13.35 solid and liquid fat, 0.32 resin soluble in ether, 13.47 resin soluble in alcohol, 1.61 erythrococalloidine, an alkaloid, 5.60 albumen, 0.83 gum, 1.55 sugar, 0.42 organic acid, 15.87 starch, 7.15 moisture and 39.15 inorganic matter.
