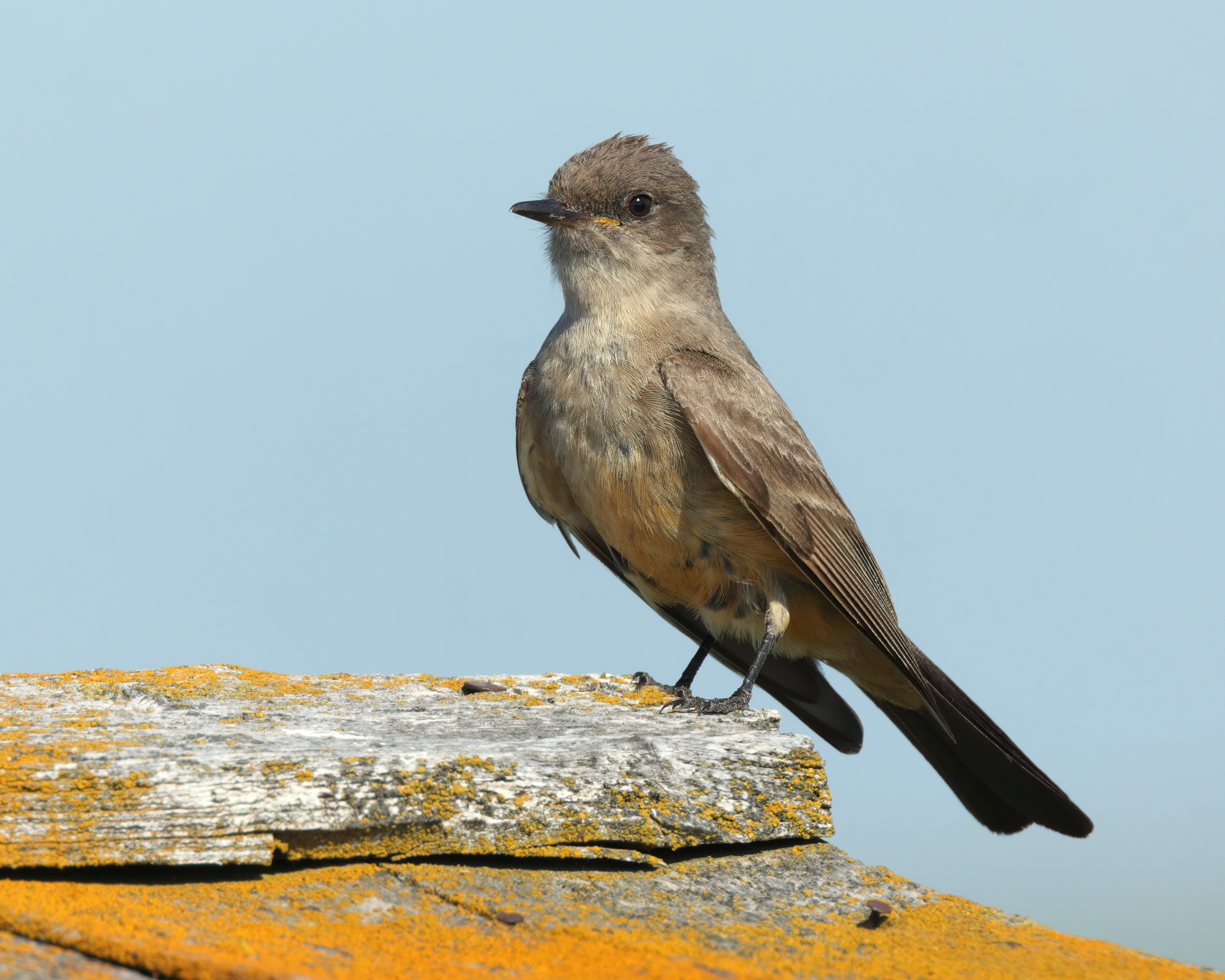

Conservation status
- Least Concern (IUCN 3.1)

Scientific classification
- Kingdom: Animalia
- Phylum: Chordata
- Class: Aves
- Order: Passeriformes
- Family: Tyrannidae
- Genus: Sayornis
- Species: S. saya

Binomial name
- Sayornis saya (Bonaparte, 1825)
- Breeding Migration Year-round Nonbreeding

= Say's phoebe =

Species of bird

Say's phoebe (Sayornis saya) is a passerine bird in the tyrant flycatcher family, Tyrannidae. A common bird across western North America, it prefers dry, desolate areas. It was named for Thomas Say, an American naturalist.

== Taxonomy ==
Say's phoebe was formally described in 1825 by the French naturalist Charles Lucien Bonaparte from a specimen collected near Pueblo, Colorado. He coined the binomial name Muscicapa saya where the specific epithet was chosen to honour the American naturalist Thomas Say. The species is now placed in the genus Sayornis that was introduced by Bonaparte in 1854.

Two subspecies are recognised:

- S. s. saya (Bonaparte, 1825) – Alaska, west Canada, west USA and south Mexico
- S. s. quiescens Grinnell, 1926 – Baja California (northwest Mexico)

== Description ==
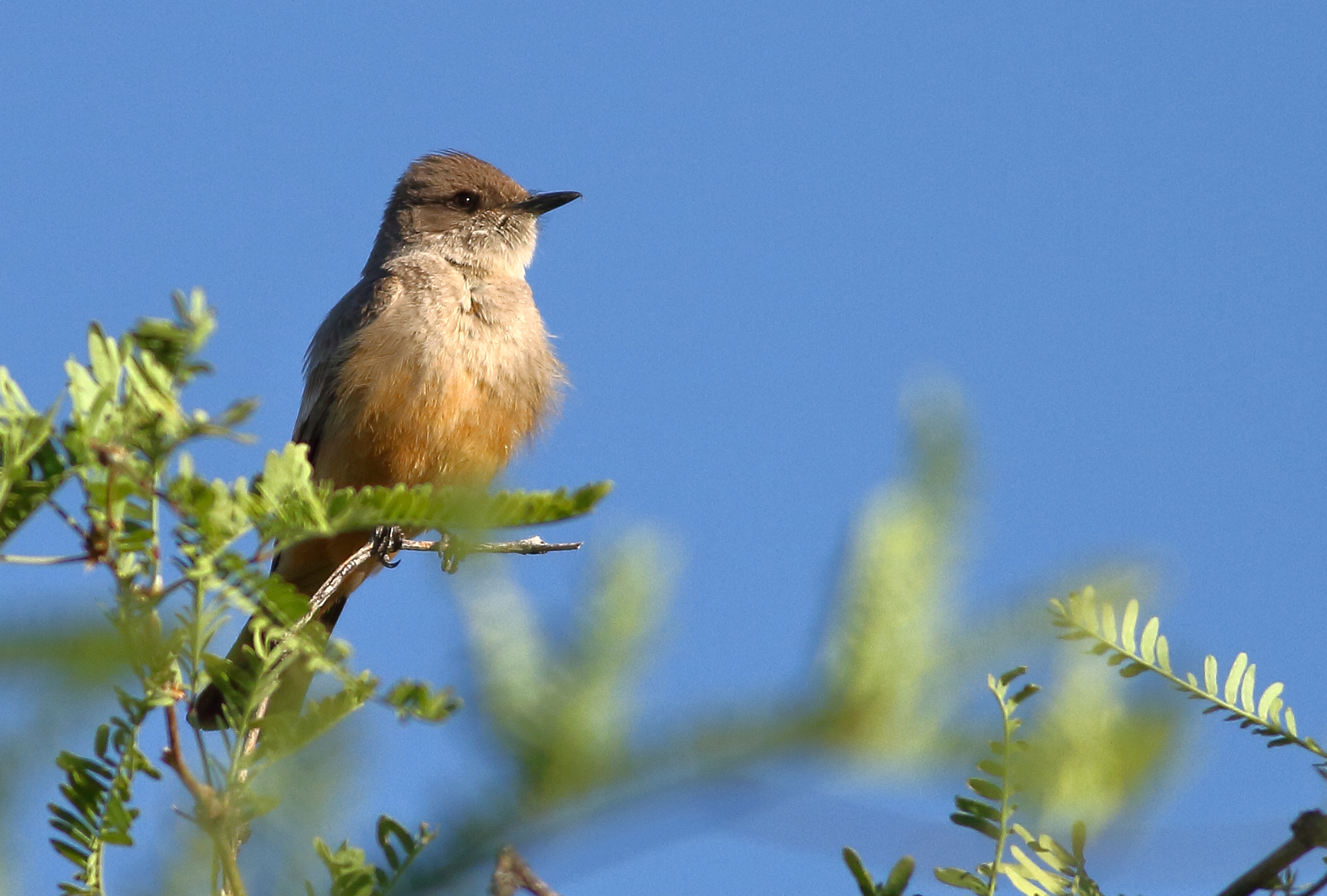
Say's phoebe in Cochise County, Arizona

Say's phoebe is a barrel-chested bird with a squared-off head. It is gray-brown above with a black tail and buffy cinnamon below, becoming more orange around the vent. The tail is long and the primaries end just past the rump on resting birds. The wings seem pale in flight and resemble a female mountain bluebird. The juvenile is similar to adult, but has buffy orange to whitish wingbars and a yellow gape. The adult bird is 7.5 in (19 cm) long, has a wingspan of 13 in (33 cm) and weighs 0.75 oz (21 g).

== Distribution and habitat ==
They are found year-round from western Colorado, southwest to southern California, east to the western panhandle of Texas and south through western Mexico. They breed from Alaska south through western and south central Canada, south through North Dakota, the midwest and to New Mexico and westward. They winter in the desert southwest to southern Texas and south through Mexico to northern Central America. During migration these birds can be found thousands of miles out of range. There are regular fall reports in New England, U.S and Nova Scotia, Canada.

These birds prefer dry, desolate, arid landscapes. They can be found on farmland, savanna and open woodlands, usually near water. They tend to be early migrants to the western U.S.

== Behaviour and ecology ==
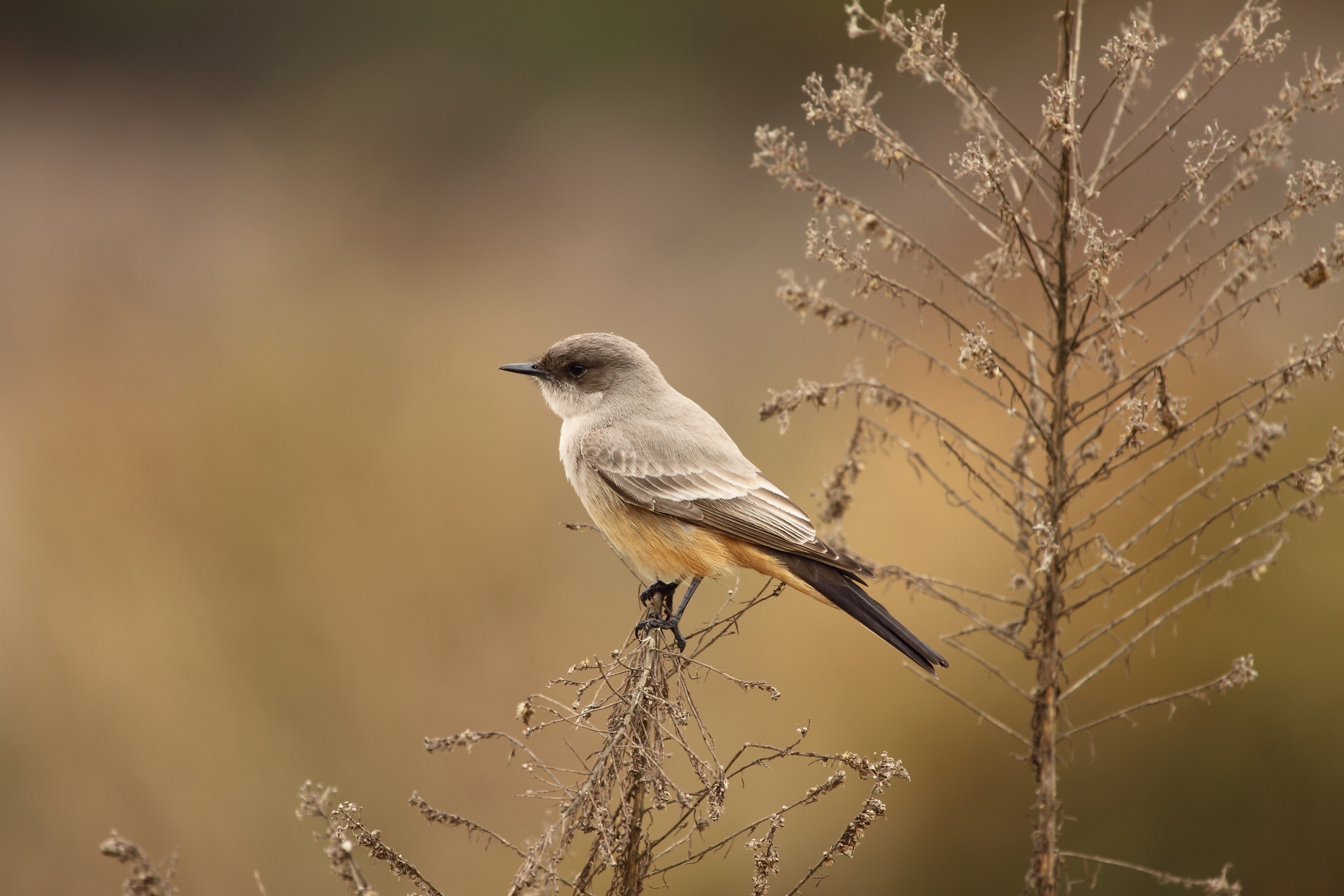
Adult Say's phoebe hunting from a perch

Say's phoebe is similar to the eastern phoebe. It sallies from a perch to catch insects in mid-air. It also hovers American kestrel–like and dips its tail while perched. Say's phoebe also likes to feed just above the water's surface. They eat insects almost exclusively, but have been known to eat berries.

Say's phoebe nest in the typical phoebe fashion. They attach their nests under bridges, canyon walls, wells and abandoned mine shafts. The nest is made by the female and is cup-shaped. It is made of grass, forbs, moss and plant fibers lined with hair and other fine materials. She lays three to seven, but usually four or five, white, mostly unmarked, eggs. Some have red spots. The eggs are roughly 0.8 in (20 mm).

=== Breeding ===
Say's phoebes have been found to breed anytime between late March and late August. They have a broad range of breeding elevation, including anywhere from 300 to 1800 meters. Their preferred breeding ground is open, arid country. Their breeding grounds are very wide—spanning throughout the western continental North America as far north as arctic Alaska to as far south as central Mexico.

=== Food and feeding ===
The diet is primarily insects. These include grasshoppers, flies, crickets, beetles and bees. However, it is disputed whether honey bees are actually suitable aspects of their diets. Their techniques for catching prey including taking it midair or pouncing on the insects while they are on the ground. They have also been observed to have consumed small fish. The diets of adult Say's phoebes varies from that of nestlings, with the latter consuming a higher share of soft foods.

=== Communication ===
Like other Sayornis species, Say's phoebe is known to use "song-like" displays as its main form of communication. Their singing is characterized as having a very loud pitch to begin and then slowly leveling off into a more steady pitch. This initial peak pitch is a distinctive trait to Say's phoebe compared to its other Sayornis counterparts. They generally use this form of communication to countersing other birds, make its presence known when patrolling its territory, and in during the early stages of mating season. Almost all males do the singing; however, a select few females engage in singing as well. Often times, Say's phoebe will sing while hovering over an open field.
