= Euphorbia elastica =

Scientific classification
- Kingdom: Plantae
- Clade: Tracheophytes
- Clade: Angiosperms
- Clade: Eudicots
- Clade: Rosids
- Order: Malpighiales
- Family: Euphorbiaceae
- Genus: Euphorbia
- Species: E. elastica

Binomial name
- Euphorbia elastica Jum.

Species of plant

Euphorbia elastica is a small tree belonging to the family Euphorbiaceae. It's native range was spread across deserts of Madagascar.
