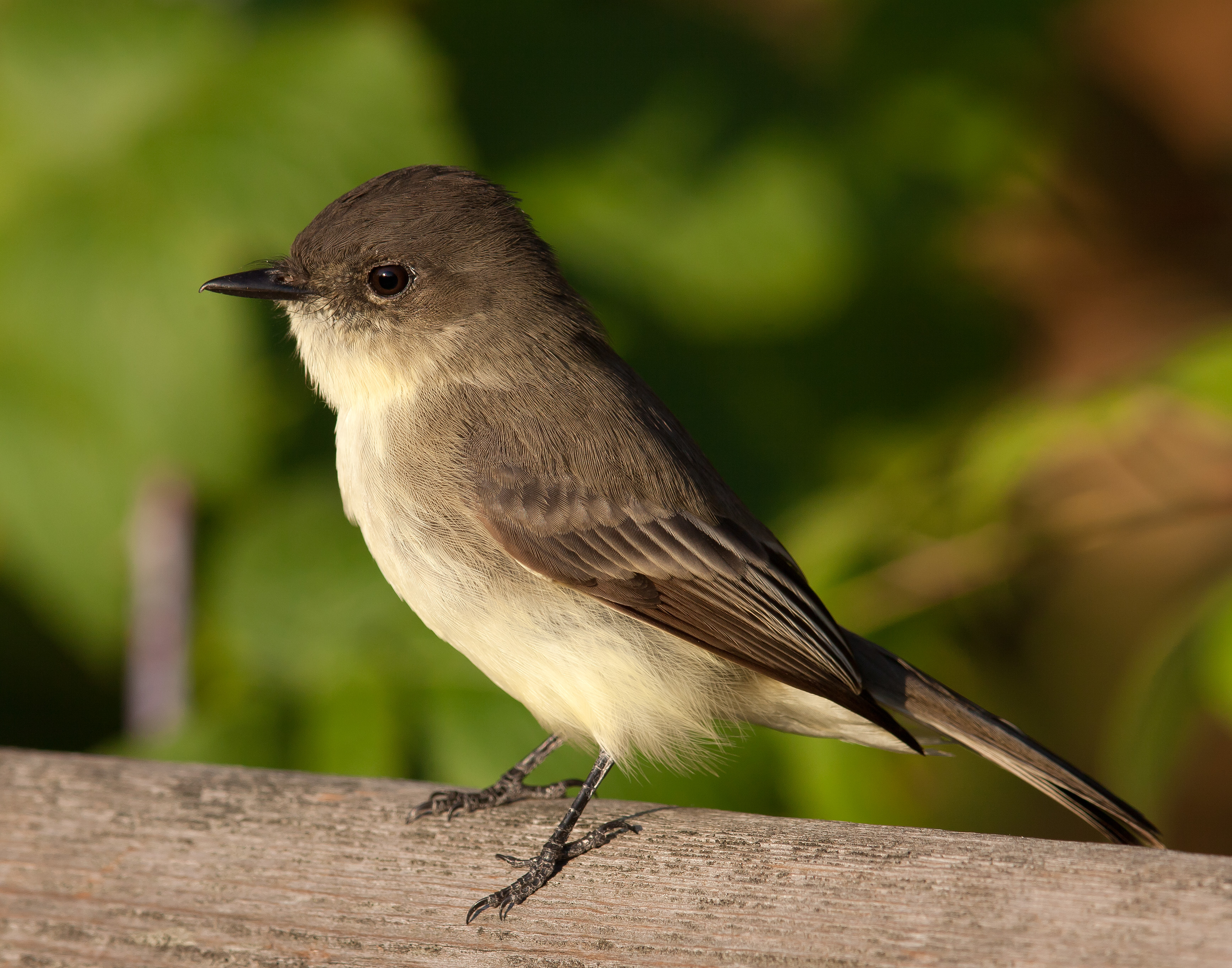
- In Madison, Wisconsin

Conservation status
- Least Concern (IUCN 3.1)

Scientific classification
- Kingdom: Animalia
- Phylum: Chordata
- Class: Aves
- Order: Passeriformes
- Family: Tyrannidae
- Genus: Sayornis
- Species: S. phoebe

Binomial name
- Sayornis phoebe (Latham, 1790)
- Approximate distribution map Breeding Migration Non-breeding Year-round

Audio
- Song, recorded in Beltrami, MN

= Eastern phoebe =

Species of bird

The eastern phoebe (Sayornis phoebe) is a small passerine bird. The genus name Sayornis is constructed from the specific part of Charles Lucien Bonaparte's name for Say's phoebe, Muscicapa saya, and Ancient Greek ornis, "bird". Phoebe is an alternative name for the Roman moon goddess Diana, but it may also have been chosen to imitate the bird's call.

== Description ==
Measurements:

- Length: 5.5–6.7 in (14–17 cm)
- Weight: 0.6–0.7 oz (16–21 g)
- Wingspan: 10.2–11.0 in (26–28 cm)

This species appears remarkably big-headed, especially if it puffs up the small crest. Its plumage is gray-brown above. It has a white throat, dirty gray breast, and buffish underparts which become whiter during the breeding season. Two indistinct buff bars are present on each wing. Its all-dark bill and lack of an eye ring and wingbars distinguish it from other North American tyrant flycatchers, and it pumps its tail up and down like other phoebes when perching on a branch. The eastern phoebe's call is a sharp chip, and the song, from which it may get its name, is fee-bee.

The eastern wood pewee (Contopus virens) is extremely similar in appearance. It lacks the buff hue usually present on the lighter parts of the eastern phoebe's plumage, and thus has always clearly defined and contrasting wing-bars. It also does not bob its tail habitually, and appears on the breeding grounds much later, although it leaves for winter quarters at about the same time as the eastern phoebe.

The eastern phoebe often nests on human structures such as bridges and buildings. Nesting activity may start as early as the first days of April. The nest is an open cup with a mud base and lined with moss and grass, built in a crevice in a rock or man-made site; two to six eggs are laid. Both parents feed the young and usually raise two broods per year. The eastern phoebe is occasionally host to the nest-parasitic brown-headed cowbird (Molothrus ater).

== Habitat ==
Eastern phoebes are highly adaptable to urban environments. They are primarily found in wooded areas, particularly streamsides, and farmlands. Eastern phoebes tend to avoid open areas and choose spots beneath trees, brushy areas, or overhangs. However, during migration in winters or in breeding season they are frequently seen around the edges of woods and other areas where water sources are abundant.

== Breeding ==
The eastern phoebe breeds in eastern North America, excluding the southeastern coastal United States. The breeding habitat is open woodland, farmland, and suburbs, often near water. This phoebe is insectivorous, and often perches conspicuously when seeking food items. It also eats fruits and berries in cooler weather.

== Diet ==
Insects make up a great majority of its summer diet; included are many small wasps, bees, beetles, flies, true bugs, and grasshoppers. It also eats some spiders, ticks, and millipedes. Small fruits and berries are eaten often during the cooler months.

== Migration ==
It is migratory, wintering in the southernmost United States and Central America. It is a very rare vagrant to western Europe. This is one of the first birds to return to the breeding grounds in spring and one of the last to leave in the fall. They arrive for breeding in mid-late March, but they return to winter quarters around the same time that other migrant songbirds do, in September and early October; migration times have stayed the same through the last 100 years. The increase in trees throughout the Great Plains during the past century due to fire suppression and tree planting facilitated a western range expansion of the eastern phoebe as well as range expansions of many other species of birds.

== In literature ==
Phoebes appear in the poem "The Need of Being Versed in Country Things", published in 1923 by Robert Frost. The poem describes phoebes nesting inside a barn on a farm abandoned after the farmhouse burned to the ground. The poem ends "One had to be versed in country things/Not to believe the phoebes wept".

They also appear in the Mary Oliver poem "The Messenger".

== Photo gallery ==
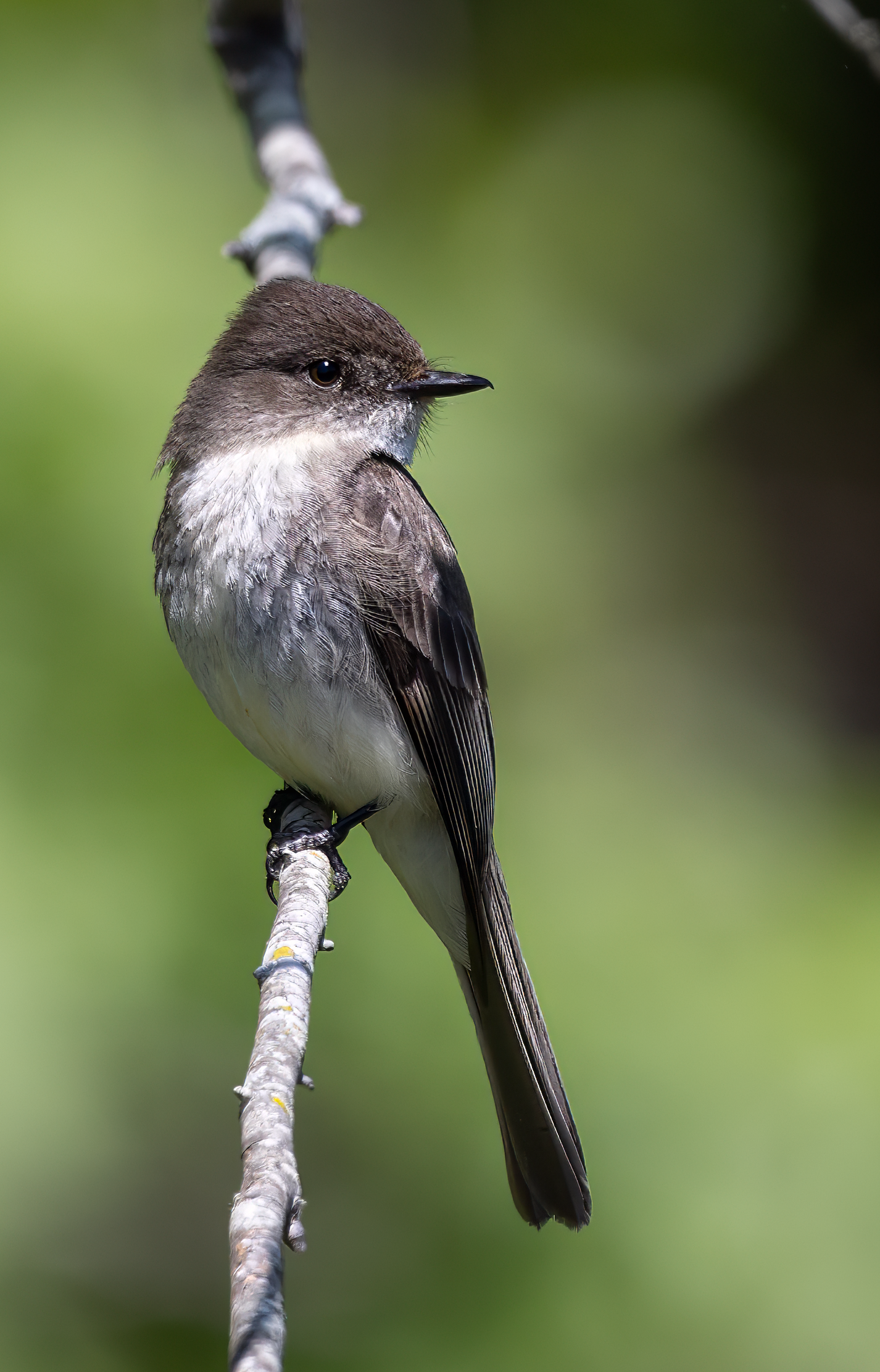
An Eastern Phoebe at Yates Mill

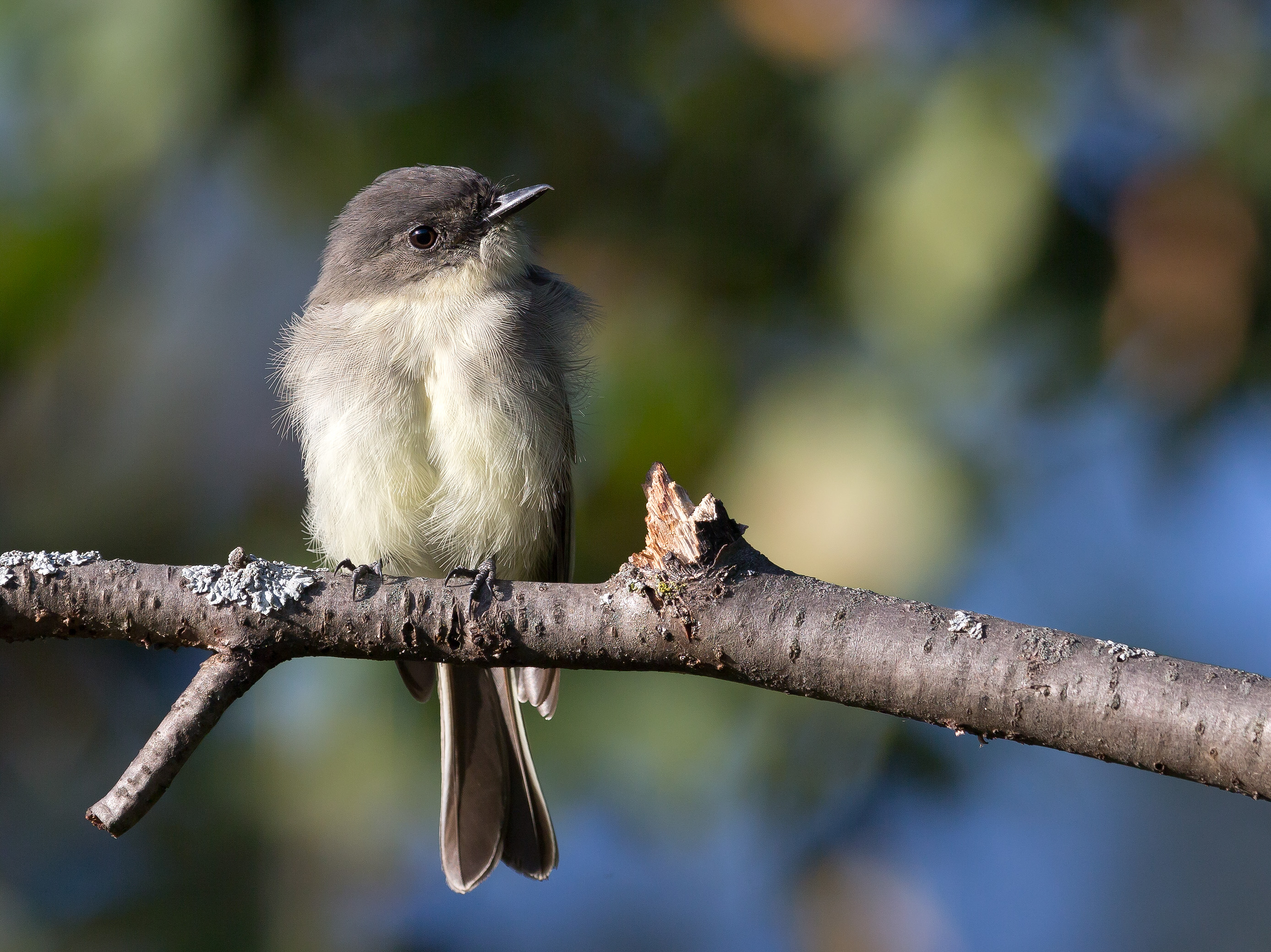
In Wisconsin

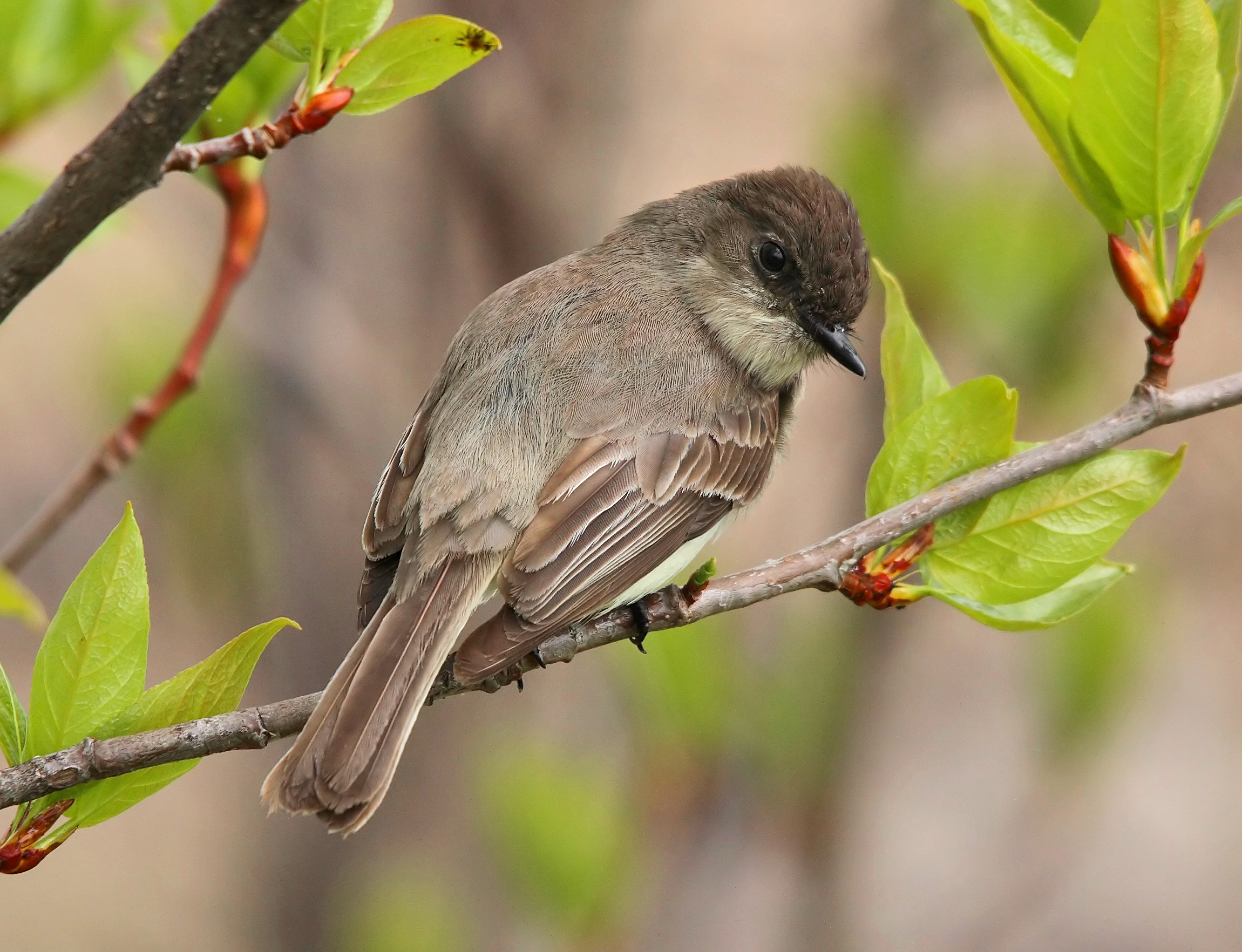
Taken at Cap Tourmente National Wildlife Area, Quebec

At Ripon, Quebec

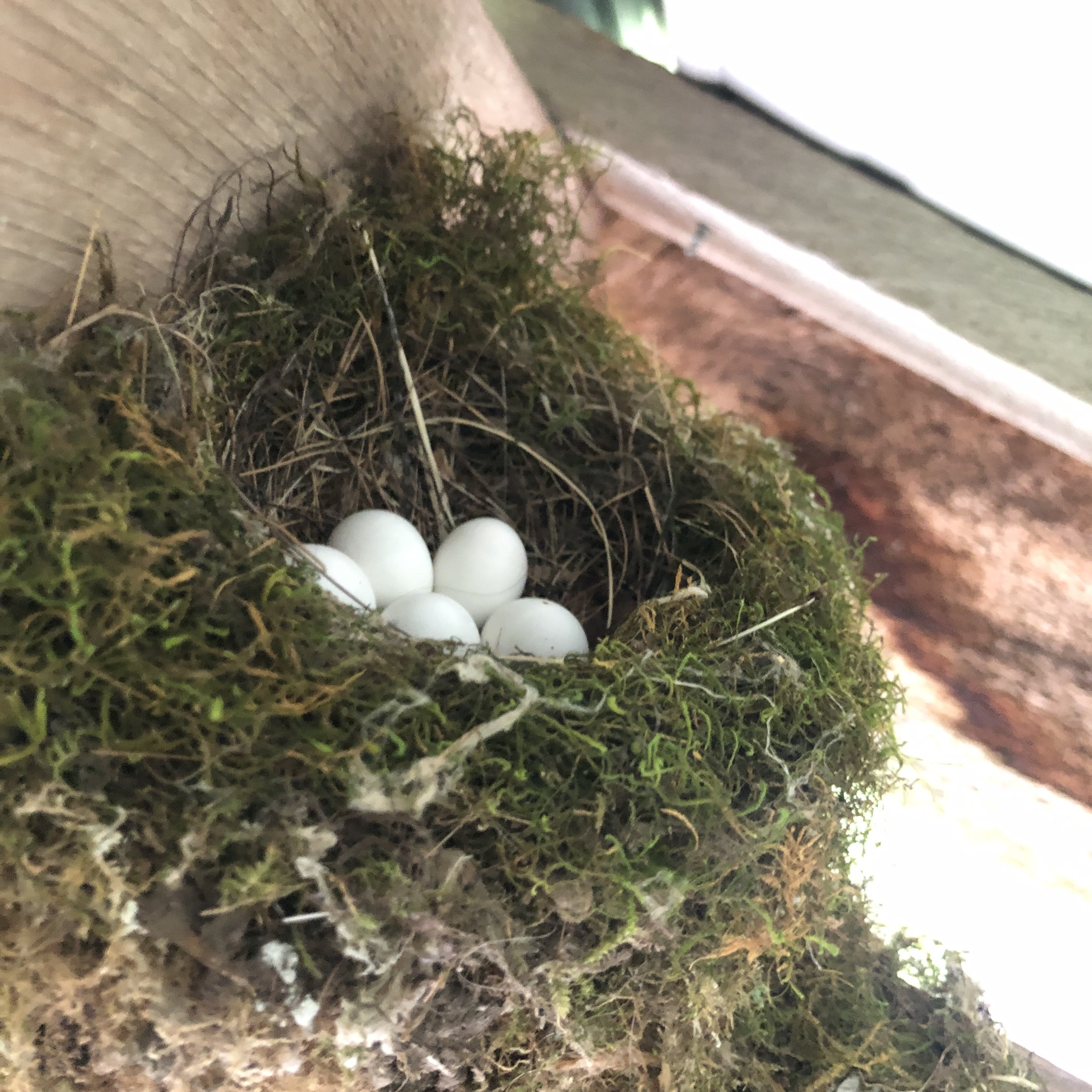
Moss-lined nest containing five white eggs

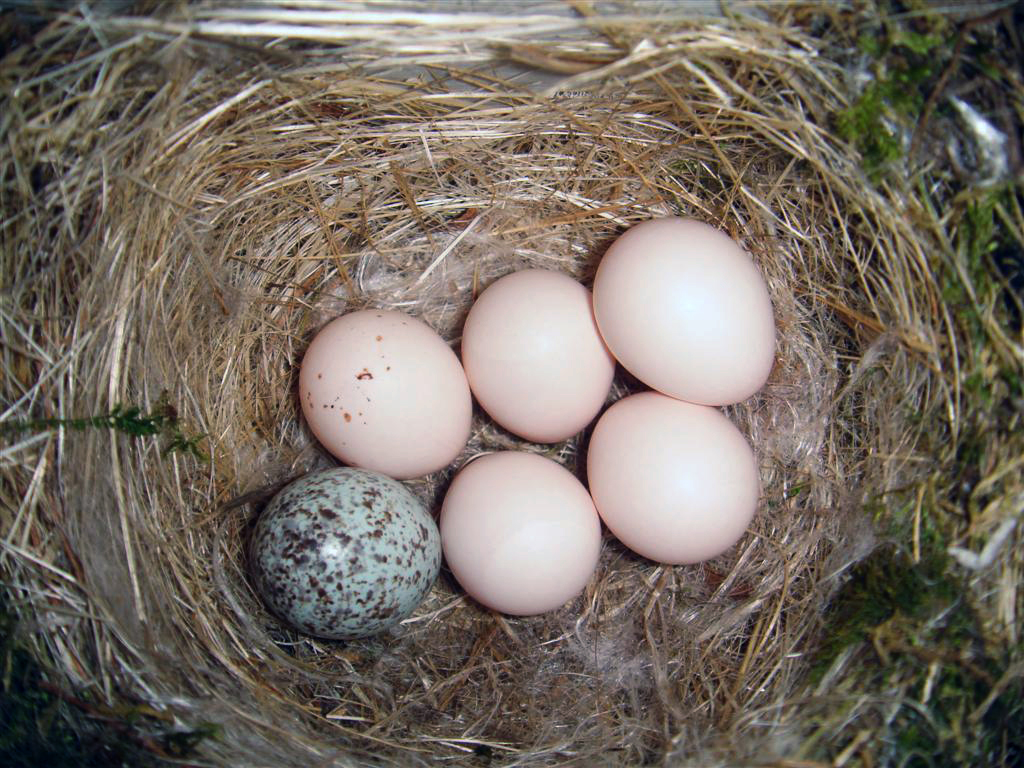
Nest with one brown-headed cowbird egg

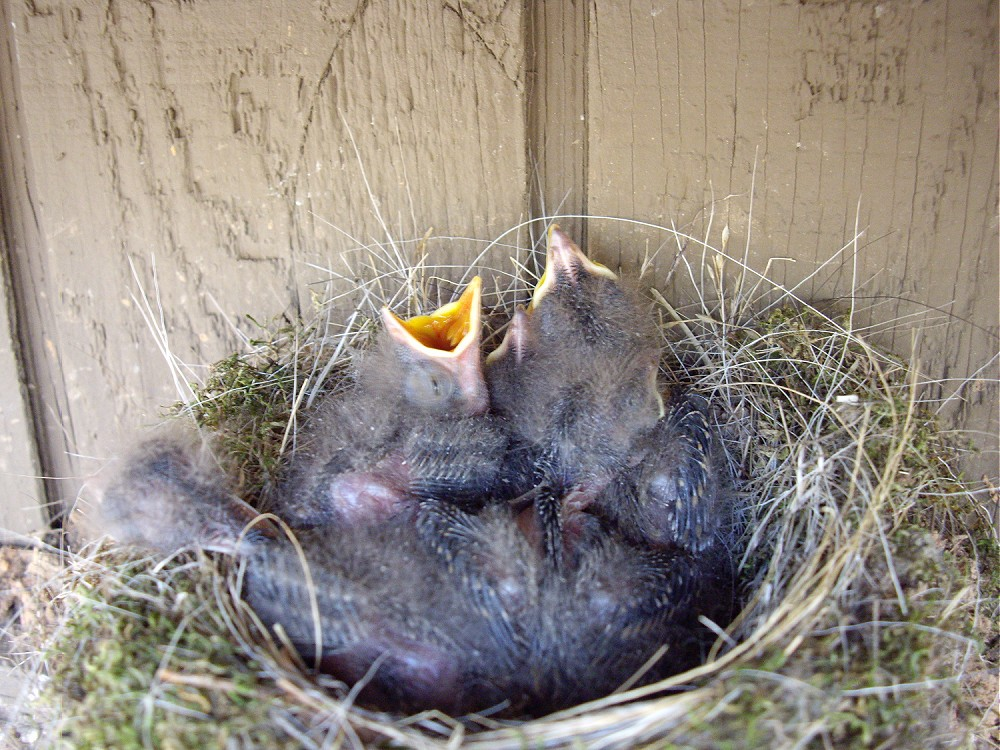
Immature birds in a nest, Norman, Oklahoma

Older fledglings in nest

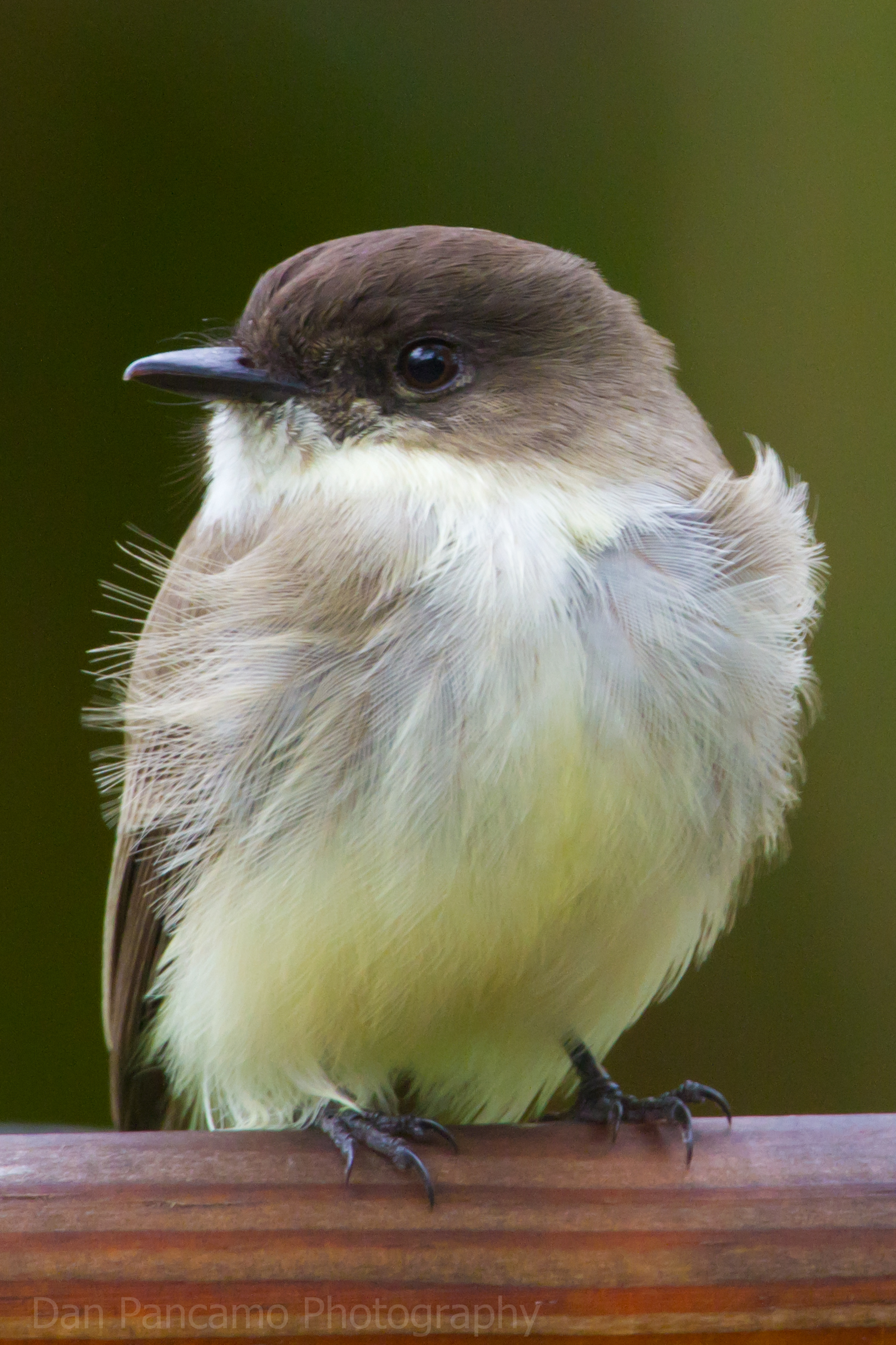
Front view

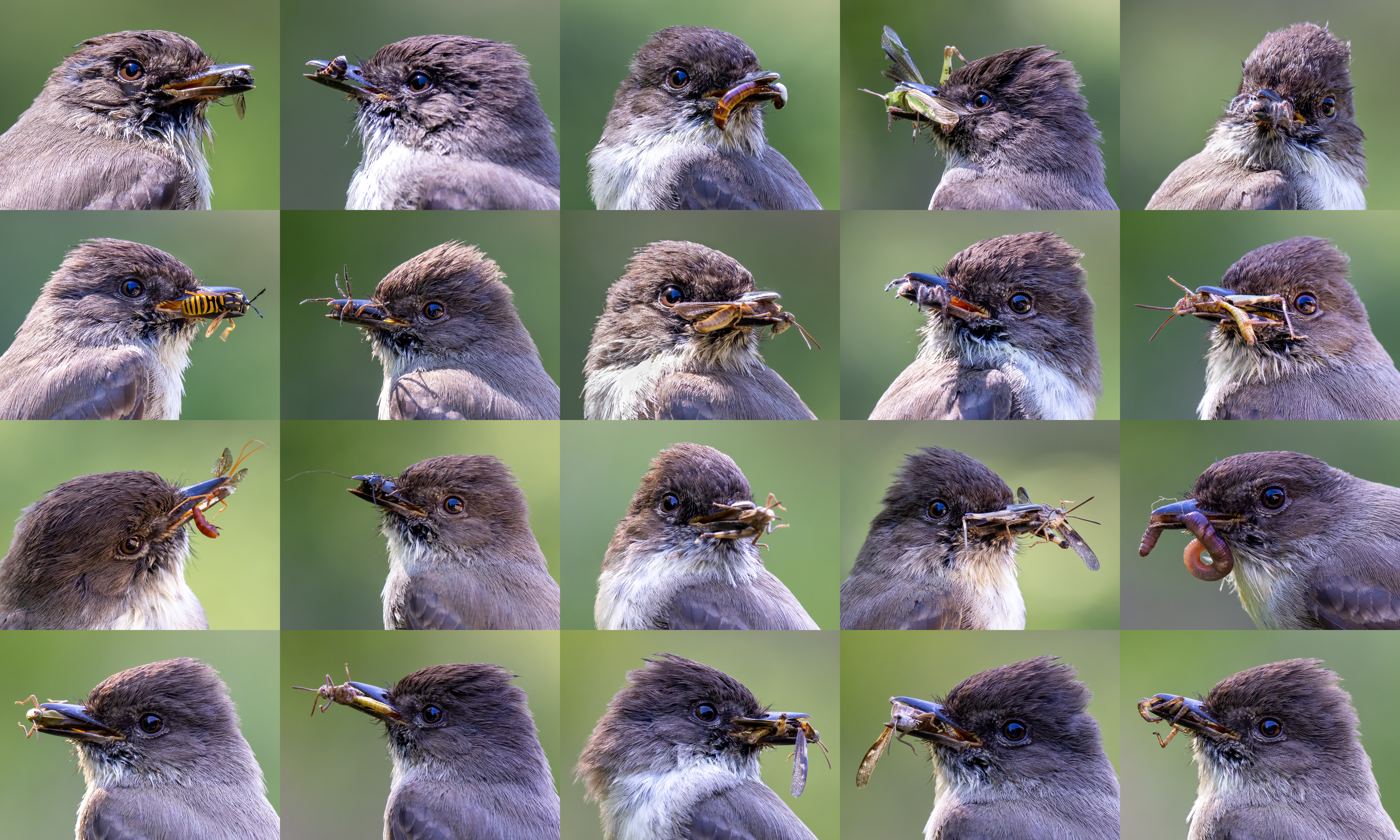
Phoebe eating various invertebrates

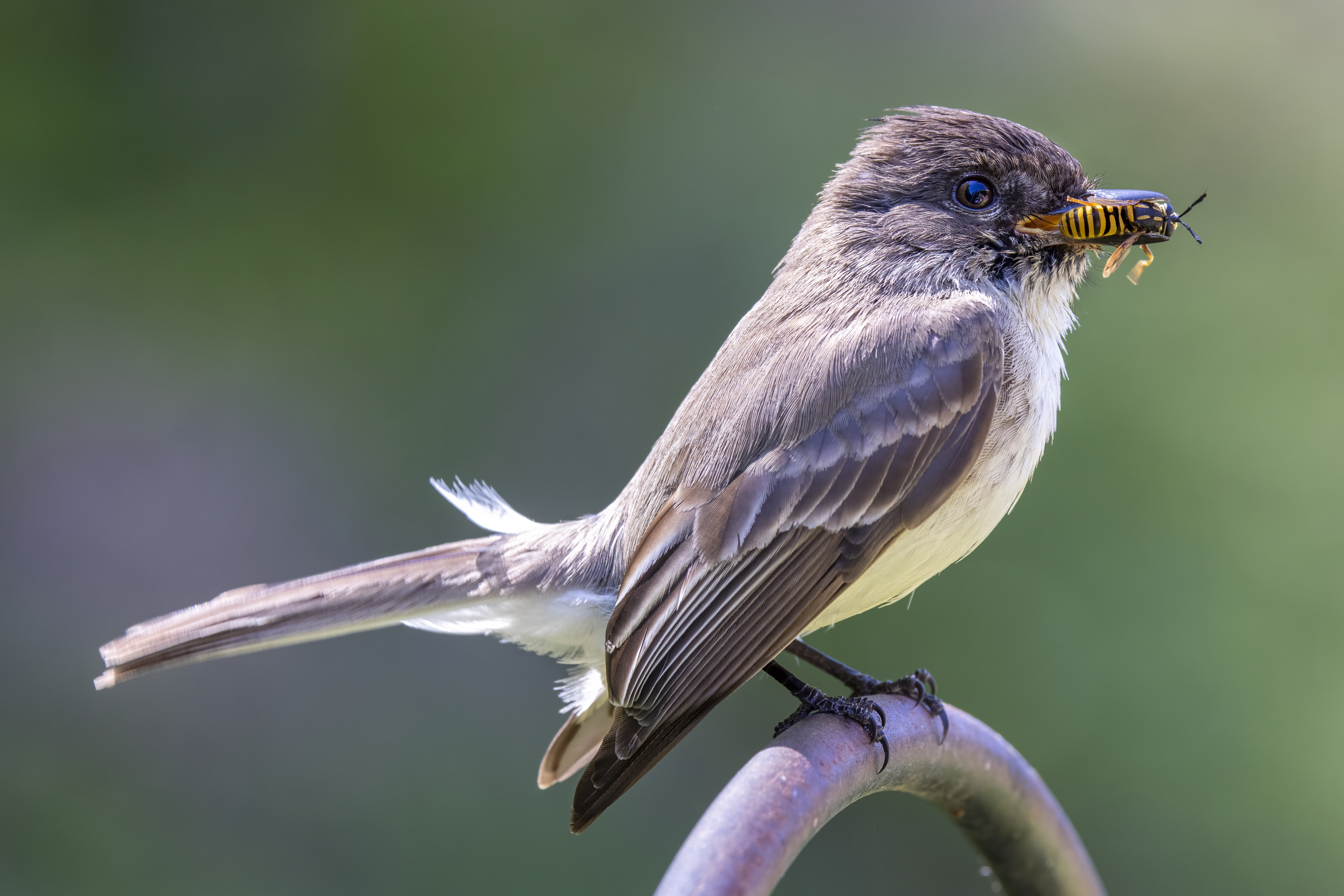
Phoebe eating a wasp

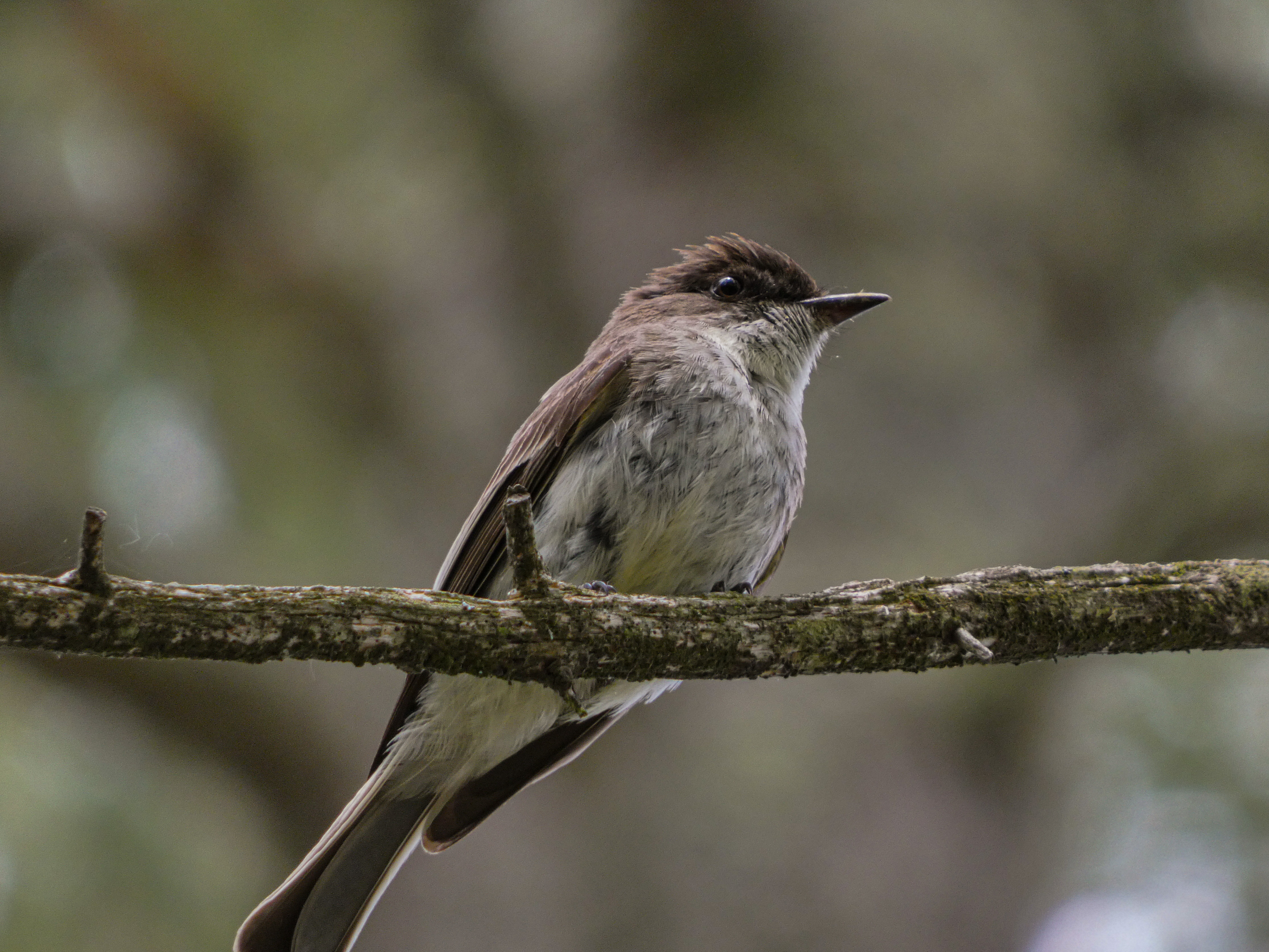
An eastern phoebe sits on a branch high up in a tree

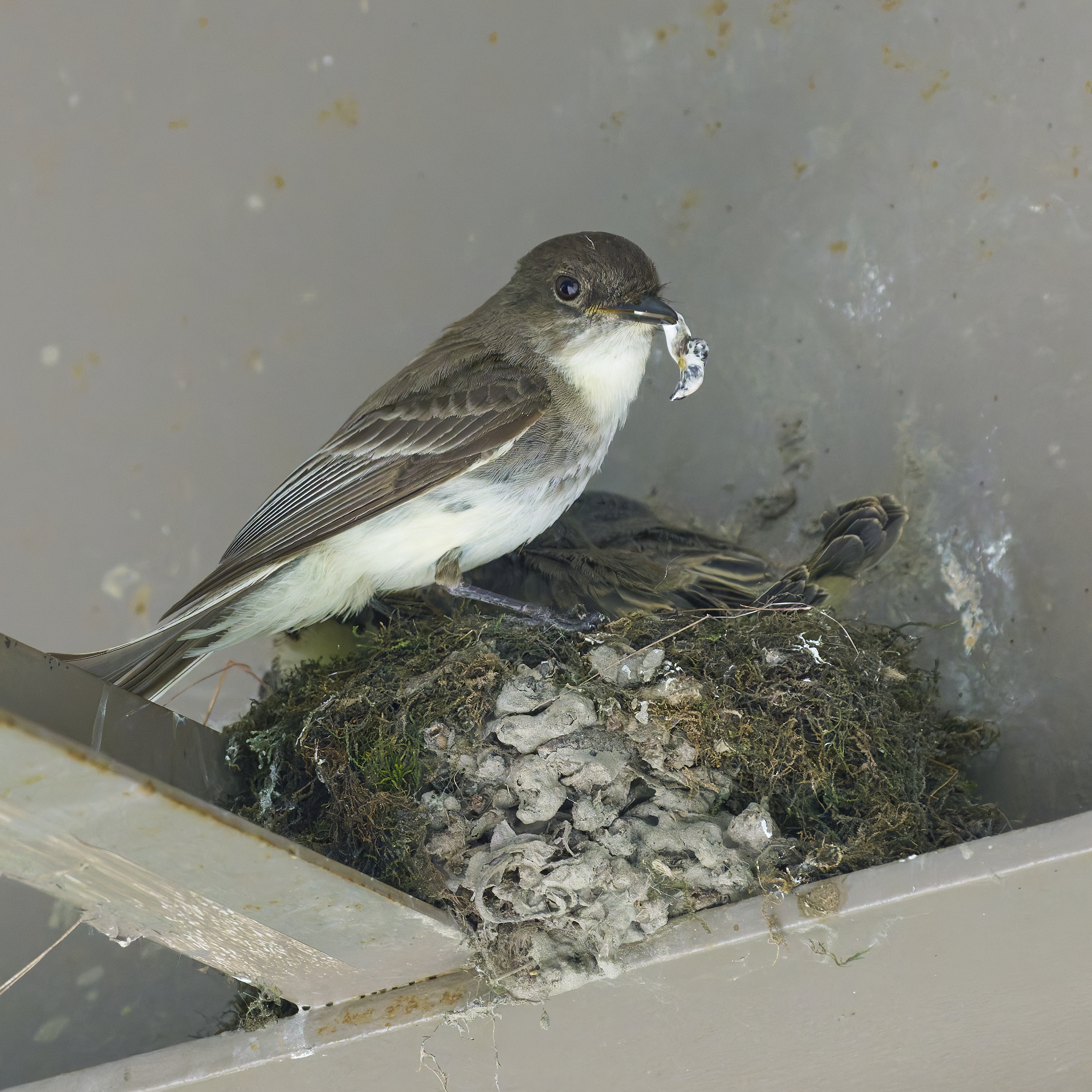
Adult removing fecal sac of a fledgling

Fledglings fed by parents
