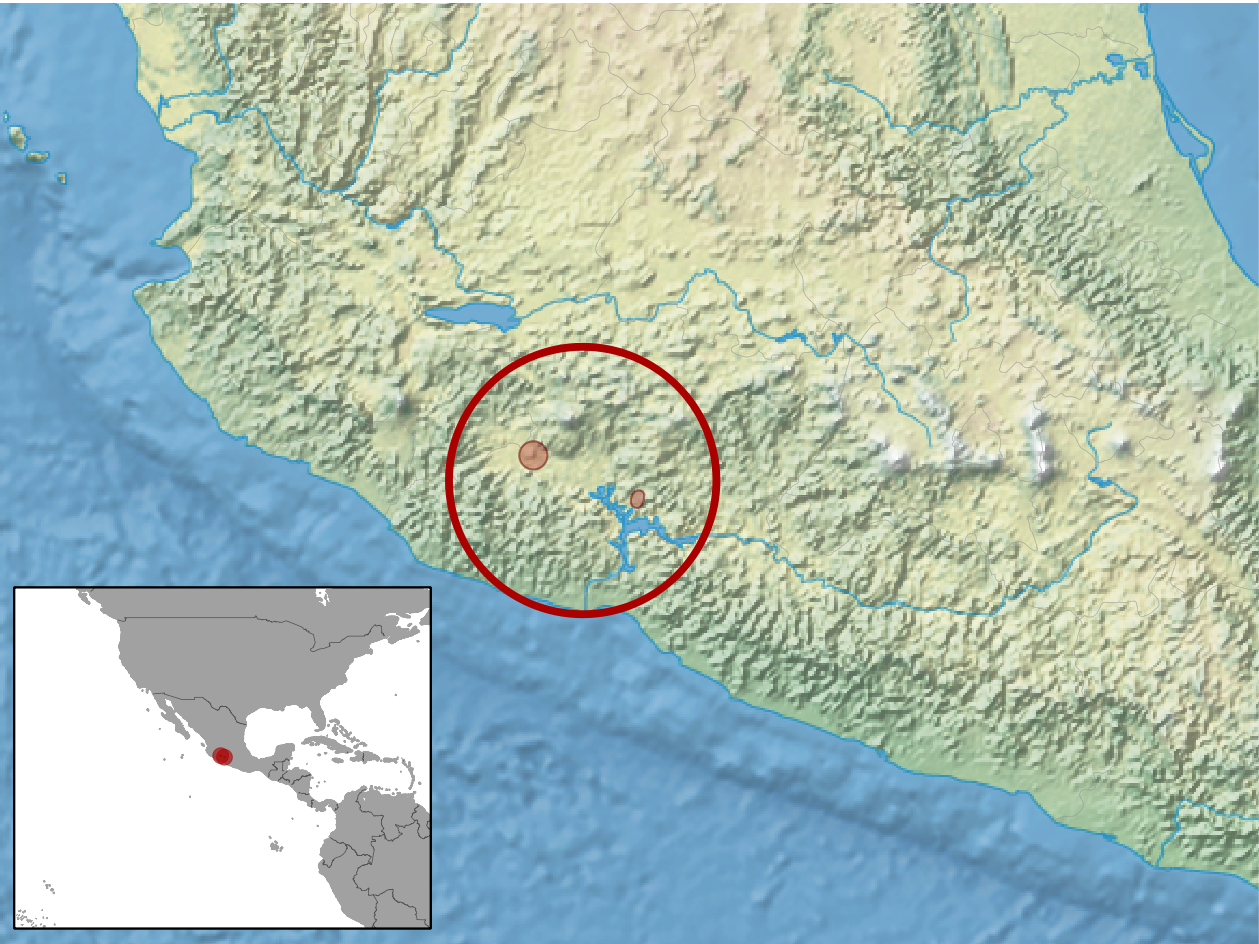
- Geographic distribution of Mesoscincus altamirani

Conservation status
- Data Deficient (IUCN 3.1)

Scientific classification
- Kingdom: Animalia
- Phylum: Chordata
- Class: Reptilia
- Order: Squamata
- Family: Scincidae
- Genus: Mesoscincus
- Species: M. altamirani

Binomial name
- Mesoscincus altamirani (Dugès, 1891)

Synonyms
- Eumeces altamirani Dugés, 1891; Mesoscincus altamirani — H. Griffith, A. Ngo & R. Murphy, 2000

= Mesoscincus altamirani =

Species of skink

The Tepalcatepec skink (Mesoscincus altamirani) is a species of lizard in the family Scincidae. The species is endemic to Mexico.

== Etymology ==
The specific name, altamirani, is in honor of Federico Altamirano who collected the holotype.

== Geographic range ==
M. altamirani is found in the Mexican states of Guerrero and Michoacán.

== Habitat ==
The preferred natural habitat of M. altamirani is forest.

== Reproduction ==
The mode of reproduction of M. altamirani is unknown.
