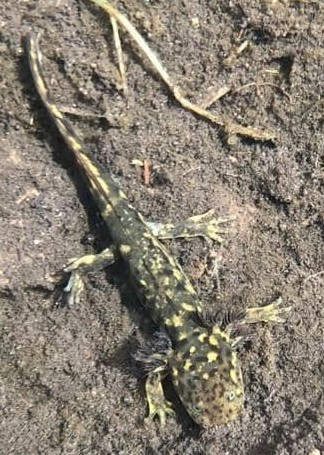

Conservation status
- Endangered (IUCN 3.1)

Scientific classification
- Kingdom: Animalia
- Phylum: Chordata
- Class: Amphibia
- Order: Urodela
- Family: Ambystomatidae
- Genus: Ambystoma
- Species: A. altamirani

Binomial name
- Ambystoma altamirani Dugès, 1895

Synonyms
- Rhyacosiredon altamirani, Rhyacosiredon zempoalaensis

= Mountain stream salamander =

Species of amphibian

The mountain stream salamander or mountain stream siredon (Ambystoma altamirani) is a species of mole salamander that only lives in central Mexico.

== Description ==
The mountain stream salamander grows to be about 115 mm long. Its tail is slender, with a low fin along the top and an even smaller fin on the bottom of the tail. The tail is about 50mm. The limbs are also slender. The dorsal surface and the sides are a purplish-black color, while the belly is a purplish-lavender. The chin and lower surfaces of the limbs are clouded with a light lavender hue. The edges of the lips, tips of the digits, and the fin on the bottom of the tail are a cream color.

== Habitat ==
The mountain stream salamander lives to the west and south of the Valley of Mexico. It lives in an altitude range of 2,700 to 3,200 m above sea level. This species lives and breeds in small streams that flow through high-elevation pine or pine–oak woodland forests. They can also be found in the streams of cleared pastures. Adult mountain stream salamanders live both on land and in streams.

== Ecology ==
The mountain stream salamander goes through a metamorphic change to become an adult. The salamander starts out as larvae and can only survive in streams. As they mature they gain limbs and the ability to live on land, as well as lose their gills and fins. Some adults, and larvae, stay in the streams year-long, but other adults go off and live on land. The adults will come back to the stream to breed and lay eggs. After laying the eggs, the adult leave their babies, showing no signs of parental care.

== Status ==
The species is currently considered an endangered species because of the huge decreases in population over the past three generations. This decrease has been caused by changes in its habitat. Illegal logging in national parks, very heavy recreational tourism, stream pollution and sedimentation, stream diversion, and the introduced predatory fishes, like trout, have all had negative impacts of the mountain stream salamander. These negative impacts have all led to the death of the mountain stream species, which then leads to a decrease in the population. Because of this, the species is now protected by the Mexican law under "Special Protection"(Pr).

== See also ==
- Salamander
- Axolotl
- Lissamphibia
