= Janczewski =

Janczewski (masculine), Janczewska (feminine) is a Polish surname. Notable people with the surname include:

- Edward Janczewski, Polish biologist
- Marta Sosińska-Janczewska, Polish pianist
- Simon Janczewski, French professional footballer
