= List of fauna of Hà Giang =

The following is a list of terrestrial vertebrate fauna of Mount Tây Côn Lĩnh, western Vị Xuyên District, Hà Giang Province, Vietnam, adapted from Nguyen, et al. (2004). The survey was conducted from 2001 to 2002 in the communes of Cao Bồ, Xín Chải, and Lao Chải. Additional species from Lunde, et al. (2003) are also listed.

== Mammals ==
There are 47 mammalian species from 22 families and 8 orders.

=== Eulipotyphla ===
Soricidae

- Suncus murinus
- Blarinella griselda
- Chodsigoa caovansunga
- Chodsigoa parca
- Crocidura attenuata
- Crocidura fuliginosa
- Crocidura wuchihensis

=== Scandentia ===
Tupaiidae

- Tupaia glis

Talpidae

- Scaptonyx fusicaudus

=== Chiroptera ===
Hipposideridae

- Hipposideros armiger

Vespertilionidae

- Pipistrellus sp.

Pteropodidae

- Cynopterus sphinx
- Rousettus leschenaulti
- Sphaerias blanfordi

=== Primates ===
Lorisidae

- Xanthonycticebus pygmaeus

Cercopithecidae

- Macaca arctoides
- Macaca mulatta
- Macaca assamensis
- Rhinopithecus avunculus

Hylobatidae

- Hylobates concolor

=== Carnivora ===
Canidae

- Nyctereutes procyonoides

Ursidae

- Ursus thibetanus
- Ursus malayanus

Mustelidae

- Arctonyx collaris
- Lutra lutra
- Martes flavigula

Viverridae

- Paguma larvata
- Viverra zibetha
- Viverricula indica
- Paradoxurus hermaphroditus
- Arctictis binturong

Herpestidae

- Herpestes urva

Felidae

- Felis bengalensis
- Catopuma temminckii
- Neofelis nebulosa
- Panthera pardus

=== Artiodactyla ===
Suidae

- Sus scrofa

Cervidae

- Cervus unicolor
- Muntiacus muntjak

Bovidae

- Capricornis sumatraensis

=== Pholidota ===
Manidae

- Manis pentadactyla

=== Rodentia ===
Pteromyini

- Petaurista petaurista
- Belomys pearsonii
- Petaurista elegans

Sciurinae

- Callosciurus erythraeus
- Callosciurus inornatus
- Tamiops maritimus
- Dremomys rufigenis
- Ratufa bicolor

Hystricidae

- Acanthion subcristatum
- Atherurus macrourus

Rhizomyidae

- Rhizomys sumatrensis
- Rhizomys pruinosus

Muridae

- Rattus flavipectus
- Mus musculus
- Mus caroli
- Rattus koratensis
- Niviventer fulvescens
- Niviventer langbianis
- Niviventer tenaster
- Leopoldamys edwardsi
- Chiropodomys gliroides

== Birds ==
There are 90 avian species from 32 families and 12 orders.

=== Podicipediformes ===
Podicipedidae

- Tachybaptus ruficollis

=== Falconiformes ===
Accipitridae

- Aviceda leuphotes
- Pernis ptilorhynchus
- Spilornis cheela
- Accipiter nisus

Falconidae

- Falco tinnunculus

=== Galliformes ===
Phasianidae

- Coturnix chinensis
- Gallus gallus

=== Gruiformes ===
Turnicidae

- Turnix tanki

=== Columbiformes ===
Columbidae

- Streptopelia chinensis
- Chalcophaps indica

=== Cuculiformes ===
Cuculidae

- Cuculus poliocephalus
- Centropus sinensis

=== Strigiformes ===
Strigidae

- Otus bakkamoena
- Taenioptynx brodiei

=== Apodiformes ===
Apodidae

- Cypsiurus batasiensis
- Apus affinis

=== Trogoniformes ===
Trogonidae

- Harpactes erythrocephalus

=== Coraciiformes ===
Alcedinidae

- Alcedo atthis
- Halcyon smyrnensis
- Halcyon pileata

Meropidae

- Nyctyornis athertoni
- Merops viridis

=== Piciformes ===
Capitonidae

- Megalaima franklinii
- Megalaima asiatica

Picidae

- Sasia ochracea
- Picus canus

=== Passeriformes ===
Eurylaimidae

- Psarisomus dalhousiae

Pittidae

- Pitta oatesi

Hirundinidae

- Hirundo rustica

Motacillidae

- Motacilla cinerea
- Motacilla alba

Campephagidae

- Pericrocotus flammeus

Pycnonotidae

- Pycnonotus jocosus
- Hypsipetes mcclellandii
- Alophoixus pallidus
- Pycnonotus aurigaster
- Pycnonotus finlaysoni

Laniidae

- Lanius schach

Cinclidae

- Cinclus pallasii

Turdidae

- Cochoa viridis

Muscicapidae

- Copsychus saularis
- Phoenicurus fuliginosus
- Enicurus scouleri
- Enicurus schistaceus
- Enicurus maculatus
- Brachypteryx leucophrys
- Myiophonus caeruleus

Timaliidae

- Pomatorhinus ferruginosus
- Jabouilleia danjoui
- Napothera brevicaudata
- Stachyris nigriceps
- Erpornis zantholeuca
- Macronus gularis
- Garrulax maesi
- Garrulax merulinus
- Garrulax milnei
- Leiothrix argentauris
- Leiothrix lutea
- Pteruthius melanotis
- Actinodura ramsayi
- Alcippe castaneceps
- Alcippe morrisonia
- Heterophasia melanoleuca
- Paradoxornis verreauxi
- Heterophasia picaoides

Sylviidae

- Tesia olivea
- Orthotomus sutorius
- Phylloscopus inornatus
- Seicercus poliogenys
- Seicercus castaniceps
- Abroscopus superciliaris
- Phylloscopus davisoni

Muscicapidae

- Ficedula monileger
- Ficedula hyperythra
- Niltava grandis
- Niltava macgrigoriae
- Muscicapa muttui
- Niltava banyumas
- Culicicapa ceylonensis

Paridae

- Parus spilonotus

Nectariniidae

- Aethopyga siparaja
- Aethopyga saturata

Zosteropidae

- Zosterops japonica

Estrildidae

- Lonchura striata

Ploceidae

- Passer montanus

Dicruridae

- Dicrurus macrocercus
- Dicrurus leucophaeus
- Dicrurus remifer
- Dicrurus hottentottus

== Reptiles ==
Reptile species from Ziegler, et al. (2014), which lists reptile species from all of Hà Giang Province, have also been added. Surveys were conducted from 2006-2008 in Tùng Vài forest, Quản Bạ District, Hà Giang Province. Ziegler, et al. (2014) listed Gekko palmatus, Sphenomorphus indicus, Ptyas major, Ptyas multicinctus, Euprepiophis mandarinus, Lycodon meridionalis, Oligodon chinensis, Oreocryptophis porphyraceus, Orthriophis taeniurus, Pseudoxenodon macrops, Rhabdophis subminiatus, and Sinomicrurus macclellandii as new records for Hà Giang.

=== Lacertilia ===
Gekkonidae

- Gekko gecko
- Gekko cf. palmatus
- Hemidactylus frenatus

Agamidae

- Acanthosaura lepidogaster
- Physignathus cocincinus
- Pseudocalotes brevipes

Lacertidae

- Takydromus sexlineatus
- Takydromus kuehnei

Scincidae

- Ateuchosaurus chinensis
- Eutropis longicaudata
- Eutropis multifasciatus
- Plestiodon chinensis
- Plestiodon tamdaoensis
- Scincella reevesii
- Sphenomorphus indicus
- Tropidophorus hainanus

Anguidae

- Ophisaurus harti = Dopasia harti

=== Serpentes ===
Colubridae

- Ahaetulla prasina
- Calamaria septentrionalis
- Coelognathus radiatus
- Dendrelaphis ngansonensis
- Dendrelaphis pictus
- Enhydris plumbea
- Euprepiophis mandarinus
- Fowlea flavipunctatus
- Hebius khasiensis
- Hebius modestus
- Lycodon meridionalis
- Lycodon futsingensis
- Oligodon chinensis
- Oligodon taeniatus
- Opisthotropis sp.
- Oreocryptophis porphyraceus
- Orthriophis taeniurus
- Pareas hamptoni
- Pseudoxenodon bambusicola
- Pseudoxenodon karlschmidti
- Pseudoxenodon macrops
- Ptyas korros
- Ptyas major
- Ptyas multicinctus
- Rhabdophis subminiatus
- Sinonatrix aequifasciata
- Sinonatrix percarinatus

Elapidae

- Naja naja
- Ophiophagus hannah
- Sinomicrurus macclellandii

Viperidae

- Deinagkistrodon acutus
- Ovophis tonkinensis
- Protobothrops cornutus
- Protobothrops mucrosquamatus
- Protobothrops maolanensis
- Trimeresurus stejnegeri
- Trimeresurus albolabris

Pythonidae

- Python bivittatus

=== Testudinata ===
Platysternidae

- Platysternon megacephalum

Geoemydidae

- Cuora mouhotii
- Mauremys mutica
- Sacalia quadriocellata

Testudinidae

- Manouria impressa

Trionychidae

- Palea steindachneri
- Pelodiscus sinensis

== Amphibians ==
Amphibian species from Ziegler, et al. (2014), which lists amphibian species from all of Hà Giang Province, have also been added. Surveys were conducted from 2006-2008 in Tùng Vài forest, Quản Bạ District, Hà Giang Province. Ziegler, et al. (2014) listed Hyla annectans, Babina chapaensis, Odorrana jingdongensis, Odorrana junlianensis, Gracixalus jinxiuensis, Rhacophorus duboisi, Rhacophorus feae, and Rhacophorus robertingeri as new records for Hà Giang.

=== Caudata ===
Salamandridae

- Tylototriton ziegleri

=== Anura ===
Discoglossidae

- Bombina maxima

Megophryidae

- Leptobrachium chapaense
- Brachytarsophrys feae
- Ophryophryne microstoma
- Megophrys sp.
- Leptolalax lateralis
- Leptolalax pelodytoides
- Leptolalax nyx
- Xenophrys major
- Xenophrys palpebralespinosa
- Xenophrys parva

Bufonidae

- Duttaphrynus melanostictus

Hylidae

- Hyla annectans

Ranidae

- Rana johnsi
- Amolops iriodes
- Amolops ricketti
- Babina chapaensis
- Odorrana livida
- Odorrana geminata
- Odorrana chloronota
- Odorrana cf. jingdongensis
- Odorrana junlianensis
- Odorrana tiannanensis
- Hylarana macrodactyla
- Hylarana maosonensis
- Hylarana taipehensis
- Limnonectes kuhlii
- Limnonectes cf. bannaensis
- Fejervarya limnocharis
- Hoplobatrachus rugulosus
- Nanorana delacouri
- Quasipaa spinosa
- Quasipaa verrucospinosa
- Quasipaa boulengeri
- Sylvirana guentheri

Rhacophoridae

- Gracixalus gracilipes
- Gracixalus cf. jinxiuensis
- Kurixalus cf. bisacculus
- Kurixalus maosonensis
- Kurixalus appendiculatus
- Raorchestes gryllus
- Raorchestes parvulus
- Philautus odontotarsus
- Philautus sp. 1
- Theloderma asperum
- Theloderma cf. corticale
- Theloderma rhododiscus
- Rhacophorus duboisi
- Rhacophorus feae
- Rhacophorus hoanglienensis
- Rhacophorus puerensis
- Rhacophorus robertingeri
- Rhacophorus hoanglienensis
- Rhacophorus dugritei
- Rhacophorus kio
- Rhacophorus rhodopus
- Polypedates leucomystax
- Polypedates megacephalus

Microhylidae

- Microhyla butleri
- Microhyla heymonsi
- Microhyla pulchra

== Endangered species ==
Endangered species include:

- Macaca arctoides
- Hylobates concolor
- Ursus malayanus
- Ursus thibetanus
- Catopuma temminckii
- Neofelis nebulosa
- Panthera pardus
- Capricornis sumatraensis
- Psarisomus dalhousiae
- Jabouilleia danjoui
- Garrulax merulinus
- Enicurus scouleri
- Palea steindachneri
- Pelodiscus sinensis
- Ophiophagus hannah
- Physignathus cocincinus
- Naja naja
- Paa spinosa

== See also ==
- Wildlife of Vietnam
