= Chinese blue-tailed skink =

There are two species of skink named Chinese blue-tailed skink:

- Plestiodon chinensis, native to China and Vietnam
- Plestiodon leucostictus, native to Taiwan
