= Bamboo snake =

Bamboo snake may refer to:

- Pseudoxenodon, a genus in the Colubridae
- Pseudoxenodon bambusicola, a species in the Colubridae
- Trimeresurus gramineus, a.k.a. the bamboo pit viper, a venomous species found only in southern India.
- Tropidolaemus wagleri, a.k.a. Wagler's pit viper, a venomous species native to southeast Asia.
- Trimeresurus stejnegeri, a.k.a. the Chinese green tree viper, a venomous pitviper species found in India Nepal, Burma, Thailand, China and Taiwan.
