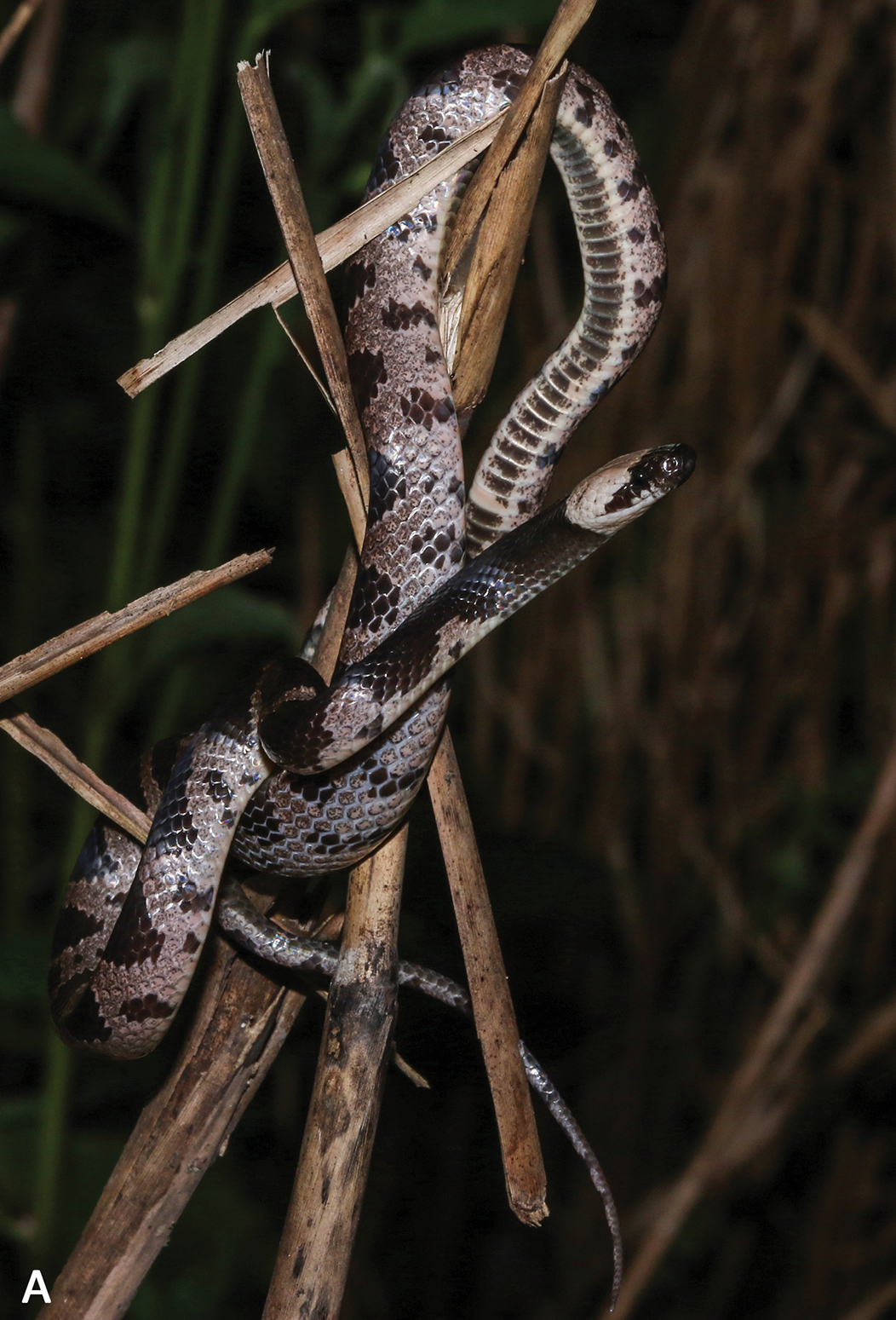

Scientific classification
- Kingdom: Animalia
- Phylum: Chordata
- Class: Reptilia
- Order: Squamata
- Suborder: Serpentes
- Family: Colubridae
- Genus: Lycodon
- Species: L. cathaya

Binomial name
- Lycodon cathaya J. Wang, Qi, Lyu, Zeng & Y.-Y. Wang, 2020

= Lycodon cathaya =

Species of snake

Lycodon cathaya, the Huaping wolf snake, is a species of snake in the family Colubridae. It is a slender species with a total length of 562.5–910.6 mm (22.15–35.85 in), a snout–vent length of 451.4–730.1 mm (17.77–28.74 in), and tail length of 111.1–180.5 mm (4.37–7.11 in). The upper side of the head is brownish-black with a grey-tinged rose collar band, while the underside of the head is mostly whitish. The upper side of the body is brownish-black with grey-tinged rose bands that divide the brownish-black ground colour into elliptical patches. The middle of the underside has irregular brownish-black splotches making an unbroken strip along the underside with two greyish-white lines along its sides. The Huaping wolf snake can be distinguished from other wolf snakes by a combination of its scalation and coloration.

Endemic to China, it was formally described by the Chinese herpetologist Jian Wang and his colleagues in 2020. It is known only from the Huaping Nature Reserve in Guangxi, but may also occur in southwestern Hunan and southeastern Guizhou. The habitat around the Huaping Nature Reserve is mountainous, with montane evergreen broad-leaved forest or mixed forest at elevations of 850–1,000 m (2,790–3,280 ft). Although the Huaping Nature Reserve is well-protected, further studies are needed outside the reserve to better inform conservation actions for the species.

== Taxonomy ==
Lycodon cathaya was formally described by the Chinese herpetologist Jian Wang and his colleagues in 2020 based on an adult male specimen collected from the Huaping Nature Reserve in Guangxi, China, in July 2016. The specific epithet cathaya is named after the monotypic pine tree genus Cathaya; the only species in the genus, C. argyrophylla is a relict that was discovered in the Huaping Nature Reserve. The authors of the study describing L. cathaya recommended the English common name 'Huaping wolf snake' and the Mandarin common name 花坪白环蛇 (Hua Ping Bai Huan She), meaning "Huaping white-ringed snake".

The Huaping wolf snake is one of over 70 species in the wolf snake genus Lycodon in the family Colubridae. The 2020 study describing the species studied its relationship with 18 other Lycodon species and found the species to be sister (most closely related) to a clade formed by L. namdongensis and L. futsingensis. A 2022 study sampling over 40 species in the genus found L. cathaya to be sister to a clade formed by L. futsingensis, L. truongi, L. chapaensis, and L. septentrionalis.

== Description ==
The Huaping wolf snake is a slender species with a total length of 562.5–910.6 mm (22.15–35.85 in), a snout–vent length of 451.4–730.1 mm (17.77–28.74 in), and tail length of 111.1–180.5 mm (4.374–7.106 in). In the holotype, the upper side of the head is brownish-black, with an evident grey-tinged rose collar band. The underside of the head is whitish, with brownish-black splotches on the mental scales, frontal chin shields, and first to third supralabial scales. The upper side of the body is brownish-black with grey-tinged rose bands, 31–35 on the body and 13–16 on the tail. The first two bands after the collar band are incomplete. Each band is one to two scales wide at its narrowest and three to four scales at its widest. These bands divide the brownish-black ground colour into elliptical patches. There is a brownish-black blotch on the sides below each band. The middle of the underside has irregular brownish-black splotches making an unbroken strip along the underside with two greyish-white lines along its sides. The subcaudal scales are mostly light brown.

In another specimen, the collar band is smaller and fainter, the bands on the upperside are faint, and there are more dark brown mottles. These differences may be because this specimen was older than the holotype. When specimens are preserved, the collar band turns beige, the bands turn darker, and the underside fades to beige.

The species can be distinguished from other wolf snakes by a combination of its scalation and colouration. The dorsal scales are smooth and have 17–17–15 rows. There are 78 subcaudal scales, 199–200 ventral scales, and two preventral scales. There are eight supralabial scales (the third to fifth of which touch the eye) and nine infralabial scales. The solitary elongated loreal scale does not touch the internasal scales, the lone preocular does not touch the frontal scale, the supraocular scale is in contact with the prefrontal scale, and there are two postocular scales. They have two anterior temporal scales and three posterior temporal scales. They have 10 maxillary teeth and the precloacal plate is whole. The species's colouration can be distinguished from other wolf snakes by a combination of the ground colour, the number and width of the bands along the body and tail, and the stripes along the underside.

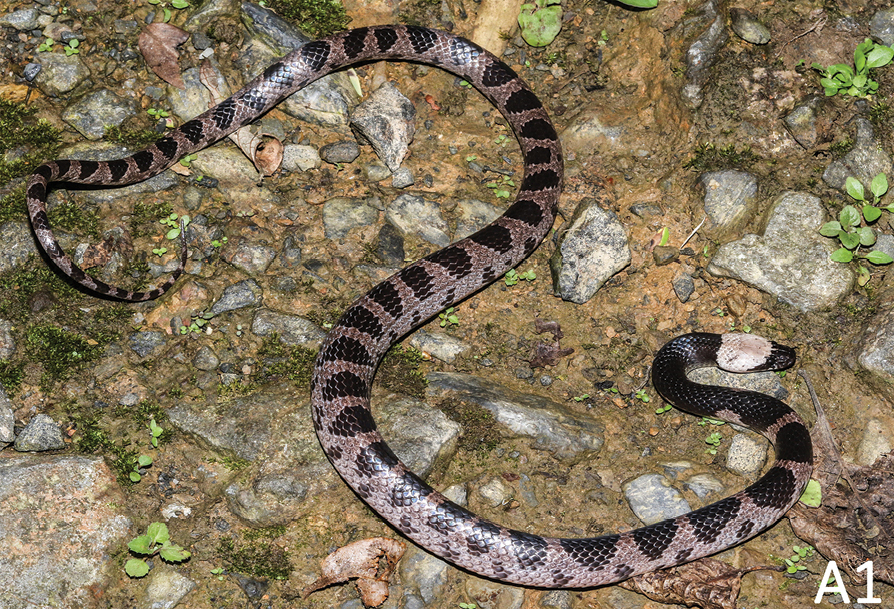
Dorsal view

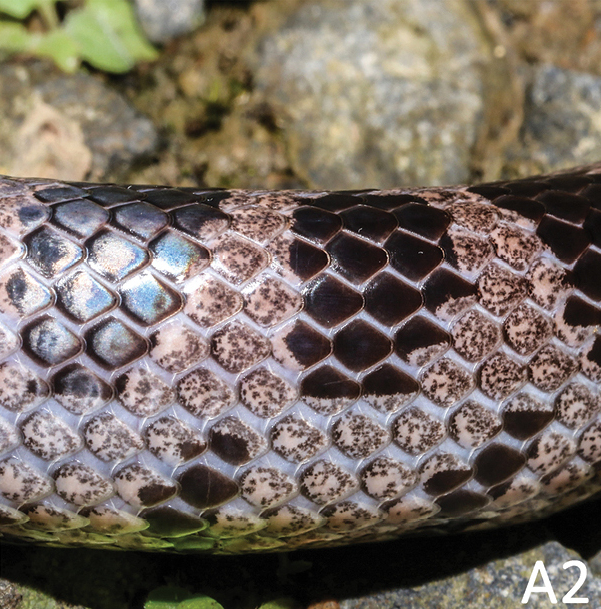
Close-up of body pattern

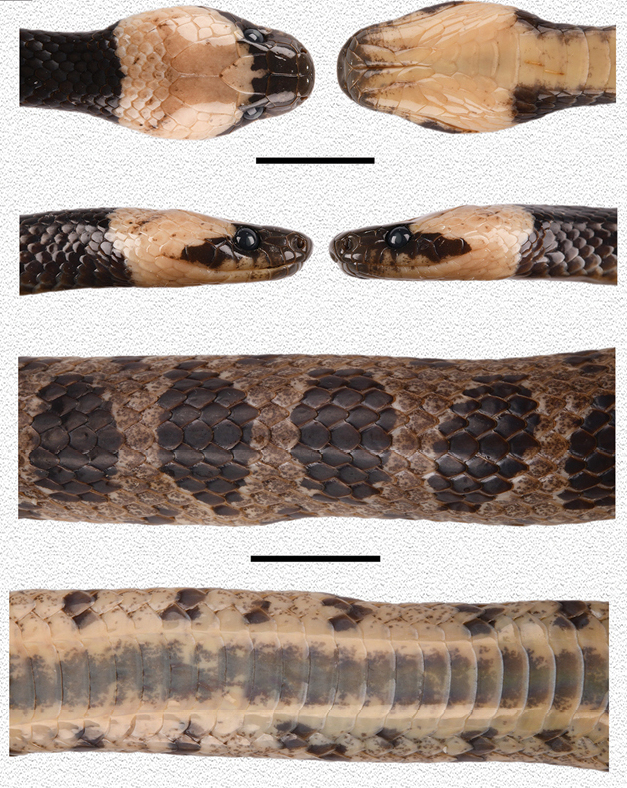
Details of head and body pattern of holotype (scale bar 10 mm (0.39 in))

== Distribution and ecology ==
The Huaping wolf snake is known only from the Huaping Nature Reserve in Guangxi, but is also thought to be found southwestern Hunan and southeastern Guizhou. The habitat around its type locality is in a mountainous region with montane evergreen broad-leaved forest or mixed forest at elevations of 850–1,000 m (2,800–3,300 ft). It is nocturnal, and has been observed climbing wilted bushes 0.5 m (2 ft) high alongside the road and on the ground. It has been observed in the same area as L. meridionalis and L. ruhstrati.

The Huaping Nature Reserve is well-protected and has been researched extensively. However, further studies are needed to ascertain the population and range of the species outside the reserve to better inform conservation actions for the species.
