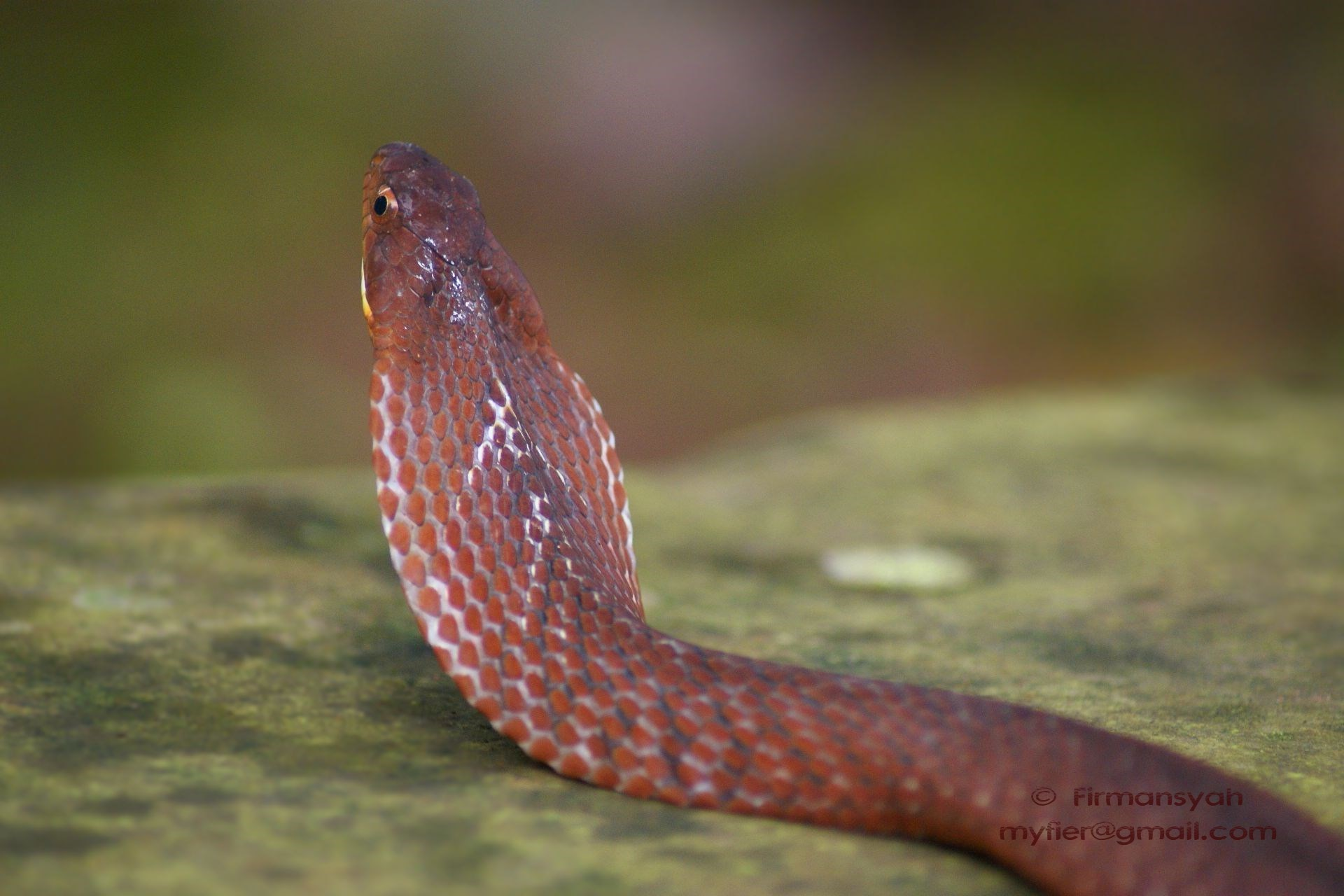

Conservation status
- Least Concern (IUCN 3.1)

Scientific classification
- Kingdom: Animalia
- Phylum: Chordata
- Class: Reptilia
- Order: Squamata
- Suborder: Serpentes
- Family: Colubridae
- Genus: Pseudoxenodon
- Species: P. inornatus

Binomial name
- Pseudoxenodon inornatus (F. Boie, 1827)

Synonyms
- Xenodon inornatus F. Boie, 1827; Pseudoxenodon inornatus — Boulenger, 1893

= Dull bamboo snake =

Species of snake

The dull bamboo snake (Pseudoxenodon inornatus), also known commonly as the Javanese false cobra, is a species of snake in the subfamily Pseudoxenodontidae of the family Colubridae. The species is endemic to Indonesia. There are three recognized subspecies.

== Habitat ==
P. inornatus lives in bamboo and wet montane forests.

== Description ==
P. inornatus may attain a snout-to-vent length (SVL) of 40 cm (16 in), plus a tail length of 7 cm (2.8 in). Its dorsal scales are arranged in 19 rows. It can spread its neck similar to a cobra.

== Reproduction ==
P. inornatus is oviparous.

== Subspecies ==
The following three subspecies, including the nominotypical subspecies, are recognized as being valid.

- Pseudoxenodon inornatus inornatus (F. Boie, 1827)
- Pseudoxenodon inornatus buettikoferi Brongersma & Helle, 1951
- Pseudoxenodon inornatus jacobsonii Lidth De Jeude, 1922

== Etymology ==
The subspecific name, jacobsonii, is in honor of Dutch naturalist Edward Richard Jacobson (1870–1944).
