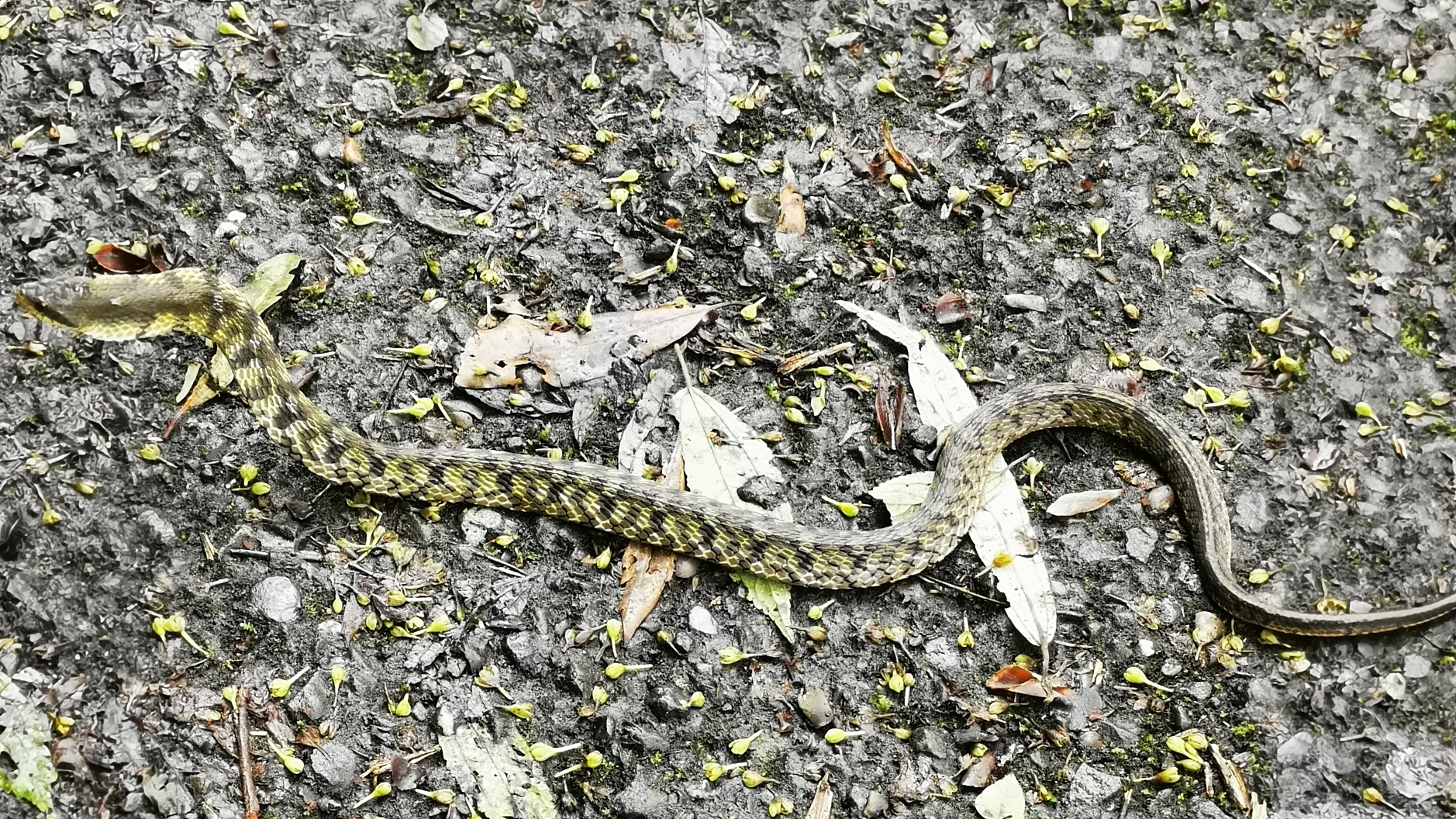

Conservation status
- Least Concern (IUCN 3.1)

Scientific classification
- Kingdom: Animalia
- Phylum: Chordata
- Class: Reptilia
- Order: Squamata
- Suborder: Serpentes
- Family: Colubridae
- Genus: Pseudoxenodon
- Species: P. stejnegeri

Binomial name
- Pseudoxenodon stejnegeri Barbour, 1908

= Pseudoxenodon stejnegeri =

Species of snake

Pseudoxenodon stejnegeri, commonly known as Stejneger's bamboo snake or (Stejneger's) mountain keelback, is a species of snake in the family Colubridae. The species was first described from Taiwan where it is widespread. It is also widespread in eastern China and has also been recorded in Yunnan and Hunan. There are two subspecies:

- Pseudoxenodon stejnegeri stejnegeri Barbour, 1908 – China, Taiwan
- Pseudoxenodon stejnegeri striaticaudatus Pope, 1928 – China

== Description ==
Pseudoxenodon stejnegeri stejnegeri grows to 90 cm (35.4 in) in total length. It is oviparous.

== Habitat ==
This species lives in dense forest on mountains at elevations of 400–2,100 m (1,300–6,900 ft) above sea level, typically near water where it forages on amphibians. in Taiwan, its altitudinal range is 1,000–2,500 m (3,300–8,200 ft).
