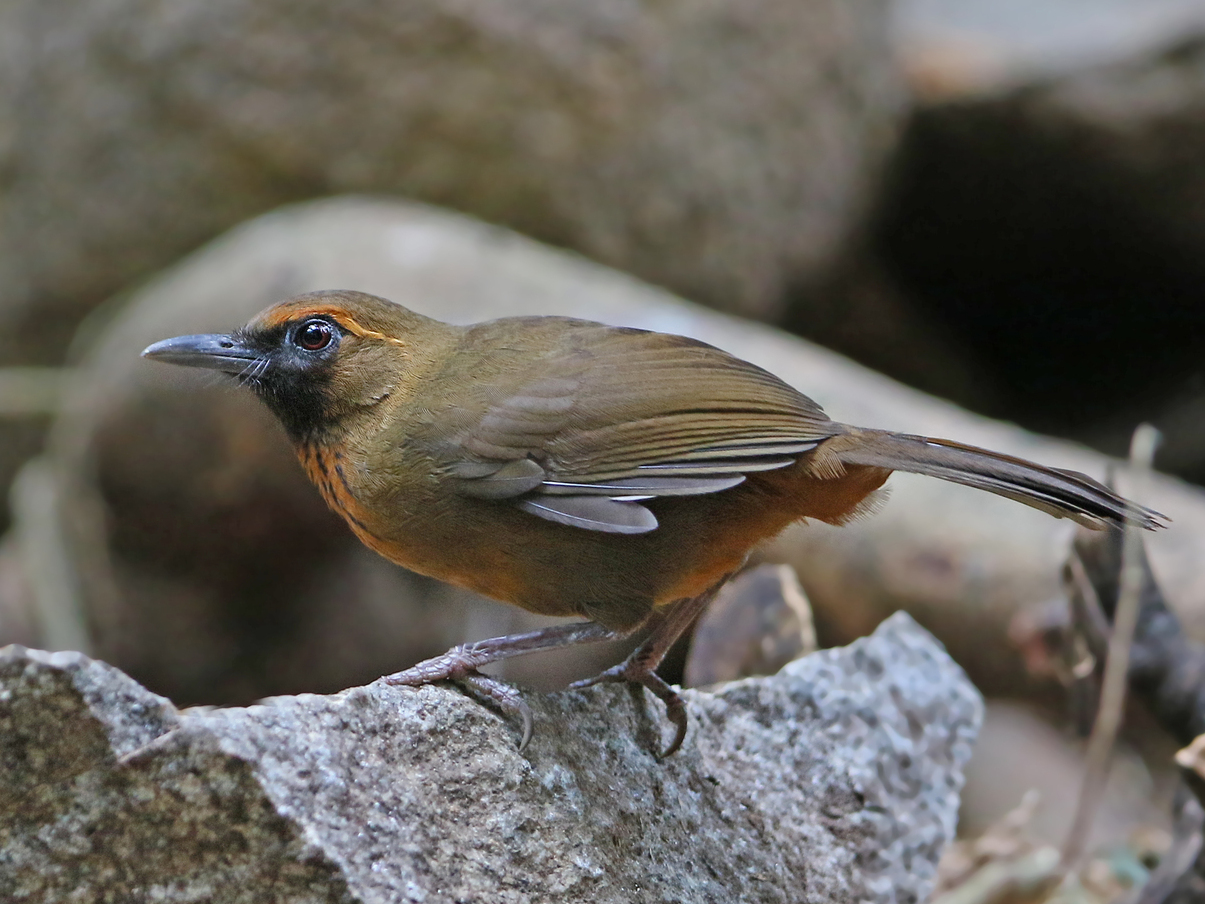

Conservation status
- Endangered (IUCN 3.1)

Scientific classification
- Kingdom: Animalia
- Phylum: Chordata
- Class: Aves
- Order: Passeriformes
- Family: Leiothrichidae
- Genus: Garrulax
- Species: G. annamensis

Binomial name
- Garrulax annamensis (Robinson & Kloss, 1919)

= Orange-breasted laughingthrush =

Species of bird

The orange-breasted laughingthrush (Garrulax annamensis) is a passerine bird in the family Leiothrichidae. It was formerly regarded as a subspecies of the spot-breasted laughingthrush (G. merulinus) but has now been split as a separate species.

It is a medium-sized bird with a strong bill and legs and a fairly long tail. It is 24–25 cm long with a bill length of 25–27 mm, a wing length of 83–92 mm and a tail length of 88–100 mm. It is mostly plain brown apart from an orange stripe over the eye, a black throat and an orange breast with black streaks. It has a loud, melodious song. The spot-breasted laughingthrush is similar but has a pale throat and breast with dark spots and a pale stripe above the eye.

It is endemic to Vietnam where it occurs in the Da Lat Plateau in southern Annam. It inhabits montane forest between 915 and 1510 m above sea-level and can survive in degraded habitats such as secondary forest and cultivated land close to forested areas. It is most often seen in pairs. Habitat loss and trapping for the caged bird trade has extirpated the species in parts of its already small range. It is classified since 2024 as Endangered by BirdLife International, particularly because the species is susceptible to lose large percentages of the global population rapidly.
