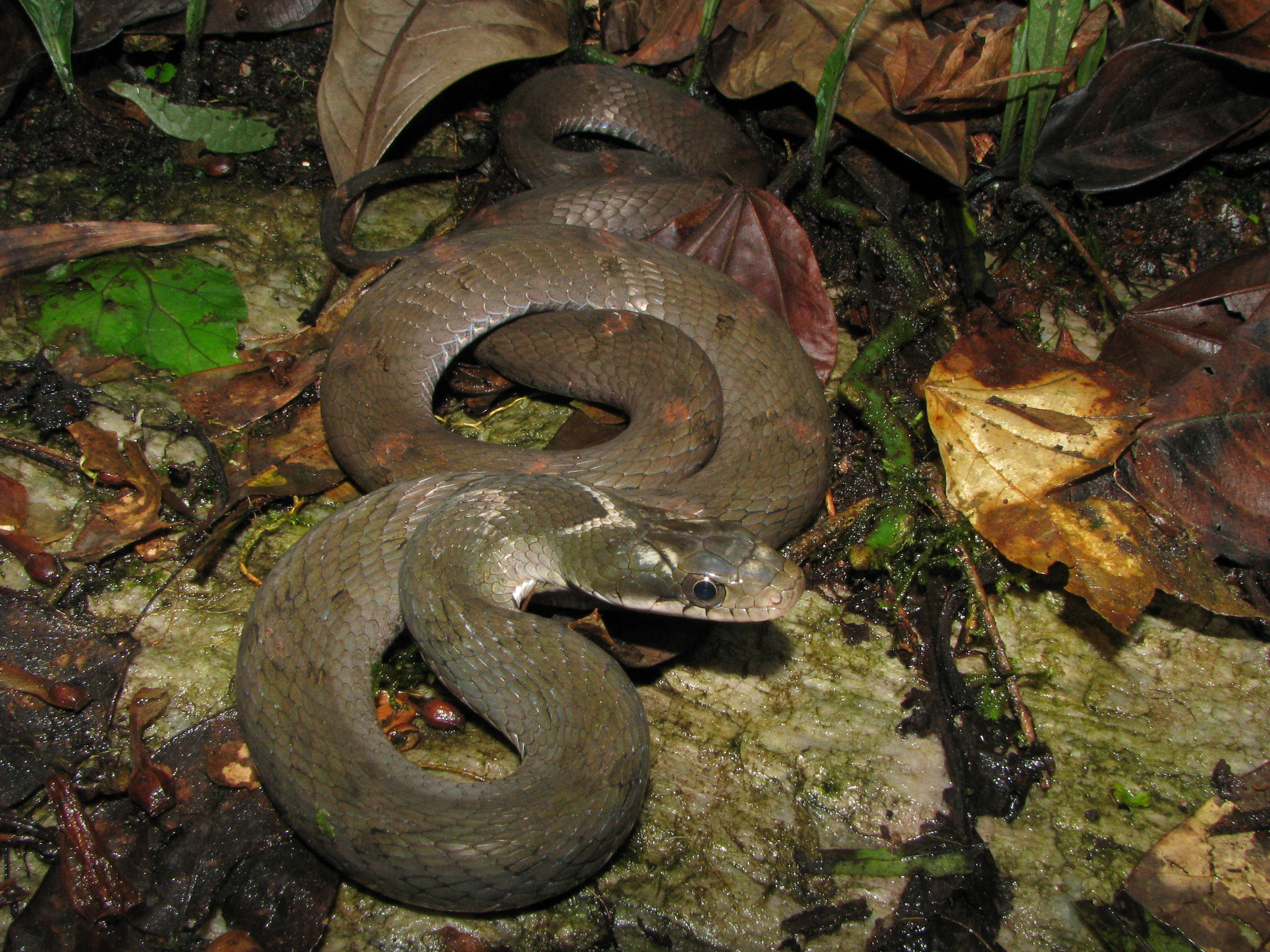
- Pseudoxenodon macrops

Scientific classification
- Kingdom: Animalia
- Phylum: Chordata
- Class: Reptilia
- Order: Squamata
- Suborder: Serpentes
- Family: Colubridae
- Subfamily: Pseudoxenodontinae; McDowell, 1987

Genera
- Plagiopholis; Pseudoxenodon

= Pseudoxenodontinae =

Subfamily of snakes

Pseudoxenodontinae is a small subfamily of colubroid snakes, sometimes referred to as a family (Pseudoxenodontidae). They are found in southern and southeastern Asia, from northeast India to southern China (including Taiwan) and south into Indonesia as far east as Wallace's Line. There are 10 species in 2 genera. Most are very poorly known, such that Pseudoxenodontinae is one of the most poorly known groups of snakes.

Pseudoxenodontine snakes are small to medium-sized egg-laying snakes. Shared features of the hemipenes between Pseudoxenodon and Plagiopholis first described in 1987, were later backed up by evidence from DNA in the early-2010s.

There are many differences between the two genera. Pseudoxenodon seem to be found along streams in wet forests, whereas Plagiopholis are apparently found in grasses, bushes, and riprap. Pseudoxenodon eat frogs and lizards and Plagiopholis eat earthworms. Plagiopholis (20 to 40 cm total length) are smaller than Pseudoxenodon (50 to 170 cm in total length). At least two species of Pseudoxenodon (P. bambusicola and P. macrops) have impressive threat displays, including flashing boldly banded ventral patterning and bright yellow coloration, spreading a hood, and playing dead. Plagiopholis have no enlarged teeth, but Pseudoxenodon have the two posterior-most maxillary teeth enlarged. No bites to humans are known.

In spite of these differences, several studies have placed these two genera in a group together at or near the base of either Dipsadinae or Dipsadinae + Natricinae, whereas one study suggested that at least Pseudoxenodon is nested within Dipsadidae and represents a reverse west-to-east colonization across the Bering Land Bridge, from South America to Asia.

== Genera ==
- Plagiopholis Boulenger, 1893, 4 species of mountain snakes
- Pseudoxenodon Boulenger, 1890, 6 species of bamboo snakes, also sometimes called false cobras
