= Pseudoxenodon baramensis =

Conservation status
- Data Deficient (IUCN 3.1)

Scientific classification
- Kingdom: Animalia
- Phylum: Chordata
- Class: Reptilia
- Order: Squamata
- Suborder: Serpentes
- Family: Colubridae
- Genus: Pseudoxenodon
- Species: P. baramensis

Binomial name
- Pseudoxenodon baramensis (Smith, 1921)

Species of snake

Pseudoxenodon baramensis, commonly known as the Baramen bamboo snake, is a species of snake in the family Colubridae. The species is endemic to Malaysia.
