= Junlian County =

Junlian County 筠连县 • Ghab Langs
- County
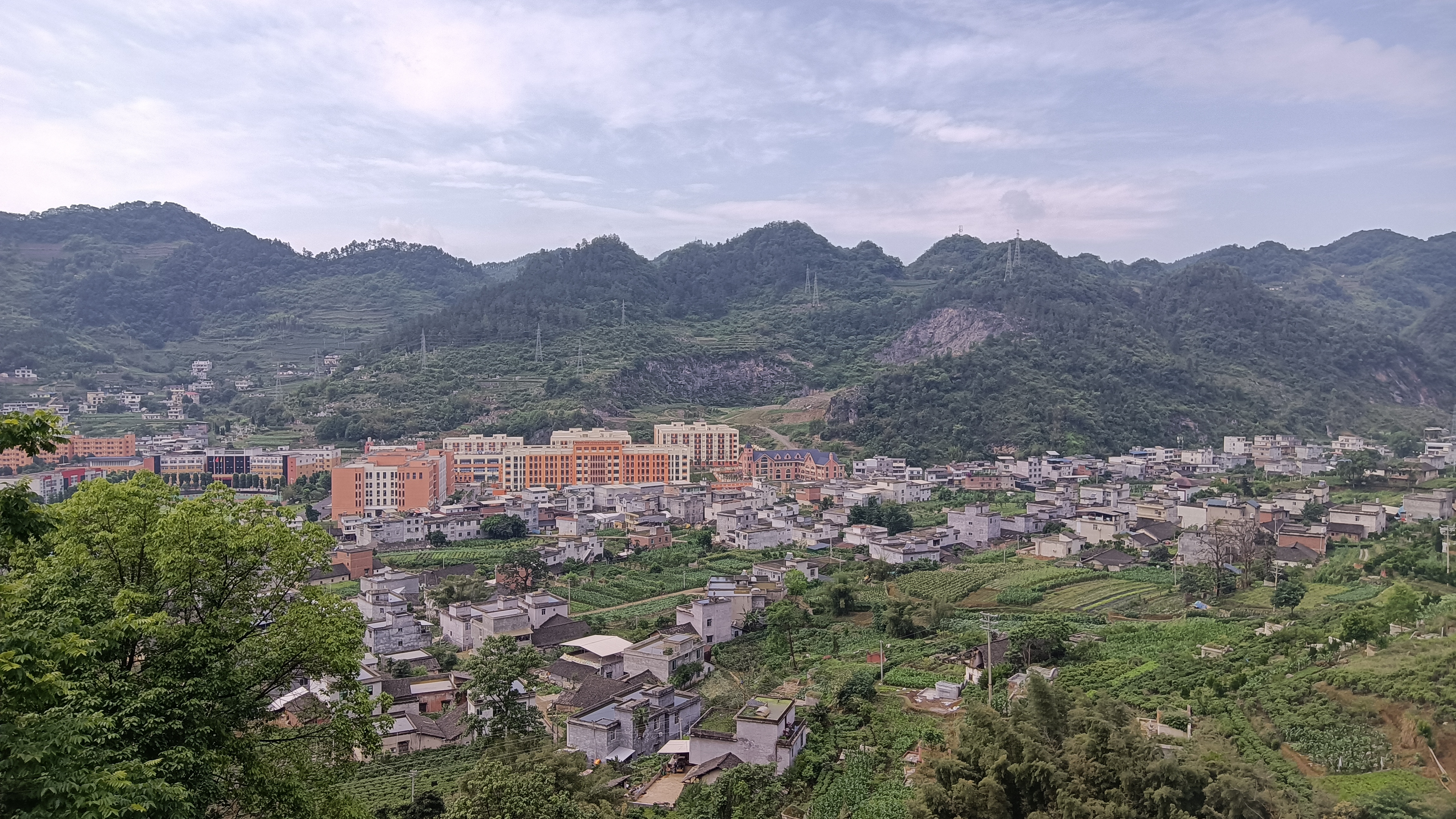

- Location of the seat in Sichuan
- Coordinates: 28.164°N 104.511°E
- Country: China
- Province: Sichuan
- Prefecture-level city: Yibin
- County seat: Junlian Town

Area
  - Total: 1,254 km^{2} (484 sq mi)
- Highest elevation (Daxueshan (大雪山)): 1,777.2 m (5,831 ft)
- Lowest elevation (Mutan River Valley): 368.5 m (1,209 ft)

Population (2020 census)
  - Total: 332,805
  - Density: 265.4/km^{2} (687.4/sq mi)
- Time zone: UTC+8 (China Standard)
- Website: www.scjlx.gov.cn

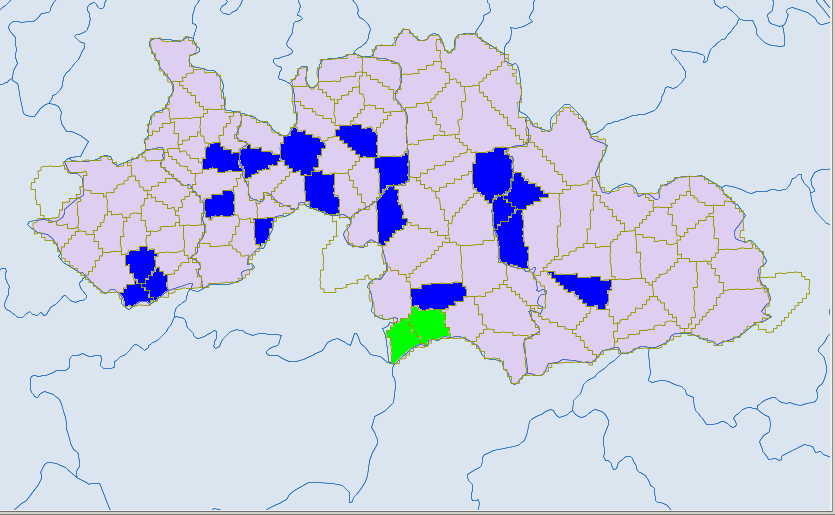
Ethnic townships in South Sichuan: Yibin and Luzhou. Light green -Yi. Blue - miao.

Junlian County (simplified Chinese: 筠连县; traditional Chinese: 筠連縣; pinyin: Jūnlián Xiàn) is a county of Sichuan Province, China. It is under the administration of Yibin city. At the end of 2019 it has a population of 450,176 of which 151,322 in the urban area. It is one of the most important coal mining areas of Sichuan.Junlian County is located along the route of the Southern Silk Road, an ancient trade network connecting southwestern China with South and Southeast Asia.

== Administrative divisions ==
Junlian administers seven towns, two townships and three ethnic townships:

- Junlian town (筠连镇), county seat
- Tengda town (腾达镇)
- Xunsi town (巡司镇)
- Mu'ai town (沐爱镇)
- Zhenzhou town (镇舟镇)
- Haoba town (蒿坝镇)
- Daxueshan town (大雪山镇)
- Leyi township (乐义乡)
- Fengle township (丰乐乡)
- Tuanlin Miao Ethnic Township (团林苗族乡, Hmongb Xangb Bangl Rongd)
- Lianhe Miao Ethnic Township (联合苗族乡, Hmongb Xangb Lax Ngok)
- Gaoping Miao Ethnic Township (高坪苗族乡, Lof Huf Qangx Hmongb Xangb)

== Cuisine ==
Junlian's speciality cuisine includes:

- Sichuan peppercorn chicken (Jiaoma chicken)
- Kuding tea
- Hunshuiba crackers,
- Junlian Noodles: A starch product made from Junlian sweet potato powder as the main raw material.
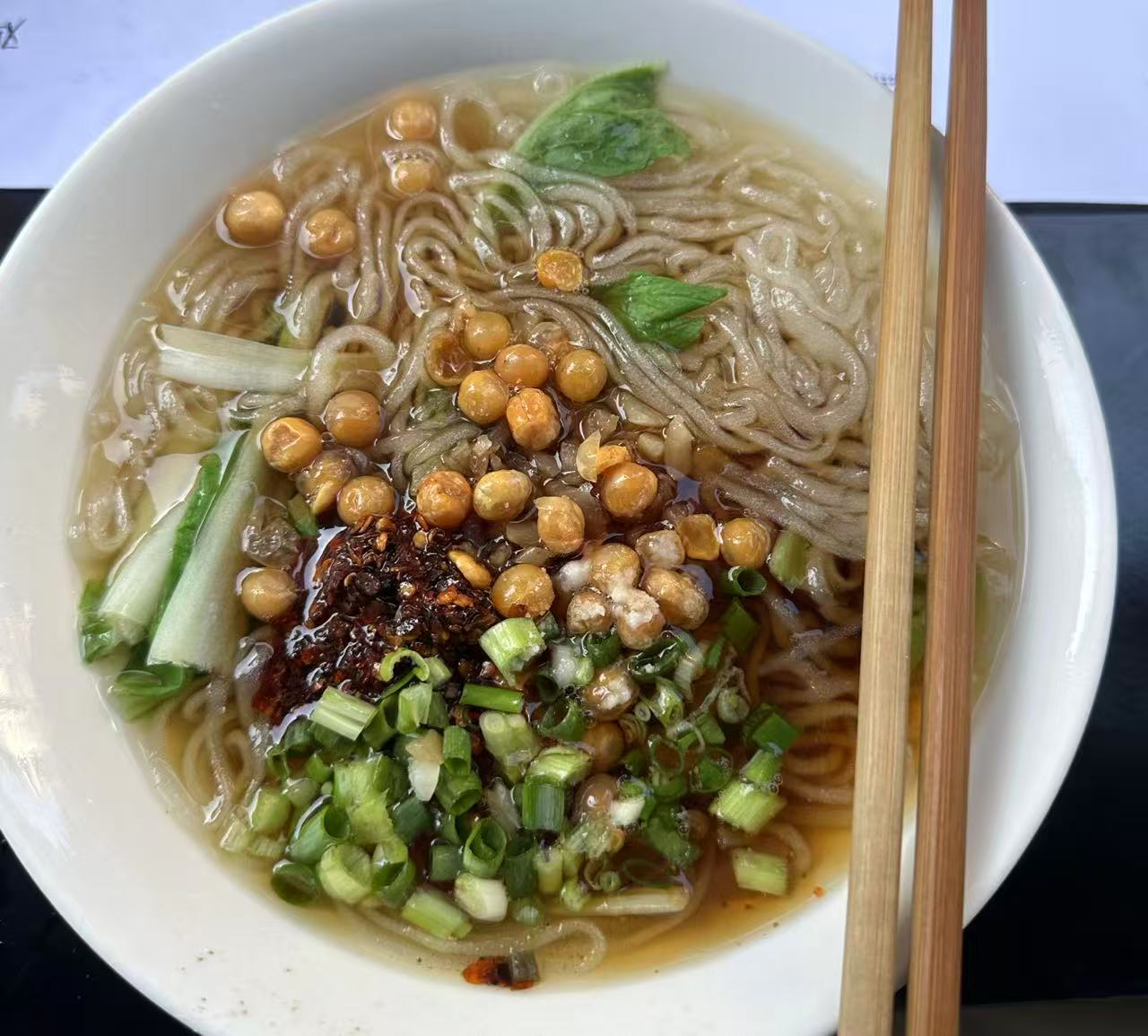
  Junlian Noodles
- Junlian beef
- Junlian black jelly
- Tartary buckwheat products (buckwheat tea / buckwheat cakes): Similar to kuding tea, these are commonly consumed local health foods.
- Junlian cured pork: A type of smoked pork typical of southern Sichuan mountainous areas, known for its rich aroma and widely used in local dishes.
- Douhua rice (Junlian-style tofu pudding with rice): A classic Sichuan dish; the Junlian version tends to be spicier and more numbing, usually served with a flavorful dipping sauce.
- Junlian pickled vegetables: Sour and spicy, refreshing, and often served as an appetizer or side dish.

== Climate ==
Climate data for Junlian, elevation 458 m (1,503 ft), (1991–2020 normals, extremes 1981–present)
Month	Jan	Feb	Mar	Apr	May	Jun	Jul	Aug	Sep	Oct	Nov	Dec	Year
Record high °C (°F)	20.9 (69.6)	25.8 (78.4)	34.8 (94.6)	34.8 (94.6)	38.9 (102.0)	37.8 (100.0)	39.0 (102.2)	40.2 (104.4)	39.2 (102.6)	31.7 (89.1)	27.0 (80.6)	21.7 (71.1)	40.2 (104.4)
Mean daily maximum °C (°F)	10.4 (50.7)	13.6 (56.5)	19.5 (67.1)	25.0 (77.0)	27.8 (82.0)	29.4 (84.9)	32.2 (90.0)	32.7 (90.9)	26.1 (79.0)	21.5 (70.7)	17.2 (63.0)	11.5 (52.7)	22.2 (72.0)
Daily mean °C (°F)	7.2 (45.0)	9.3 (48.7)	14.2 (57.6)	18.8 (65.8)	21.7 (71.1)	24.0 (75.2)	26.1 (79.0)	26.4 (79.5)	21.8 (71.2)	17.7 (63.9)	13.4 (56.1)	8.3 (46.9)	17.4 (63.3)
Mean daily minimum °C (°F)	5.3 (41.5)	6.8 (44.2)	10.9 (51.6)	14.8 (58.6)	17.8 (64.0)	20.7 (69.3)	22.4 (72.3)	22.5 (72.5)	19.5 (67.1)	15.6 (60.1)	11.4 (52.5)	6.5 (43.7)	14.5 (58.1)
Record low °C (°F)	−1.3 (29.7)	−0.4 (31.3)	1.5 (34.7)	5.6 (42.1)	10.0 (50.0)	15.1 (59.2)	16.1 (61.0)	17.3 (63.1)	13.1 (55.6)	5.8 (42.4)	1.5 (34.7)	−2.3 (27.9)	−2.3 (27.9)
Average precipitation mm (inches)	30.8 (1.21)	25.0 (0.98)	45.9 (1.81)	81.3 (3.20)	90.5 (3.56)	175.7 (6.92)	202.5 (7.97)	247.2 (9.73)	159.1 (6.26)	84.9 (3.34)	36.6 (1.44)	28.3 (1.11)	1,207.8 (47.53)
Average precipitation days (≥ 0.1 mm)	17.2	13.6	15.0	15.3	15.9	19.3	17.0	15.1	19.5	20.8	16.4	16.8	201.9
Average snowy days	0.2	0	0	0	0	0	0	0	0	0	0	0.2	0.4
Average relative humidity (%)	84	80	76	75	75	81	81	80	87	88	86	86	82
Mean monthly sunshine hours	33.0	54.4	94.3	126.8	119.9	90.6	158.2	179.2	57.2	44.7	43.3	33.1	1,034.7
Percentage possible sunshine	10	17	25	33	28	22	38	45	16	13	14	10	23
Source: China Meteorological Administration

== Wildlife ==
The Junlian odorous frog, Odorrana junlianensis, is a species of frog that was described as a new species based on specimens from Junlian.
