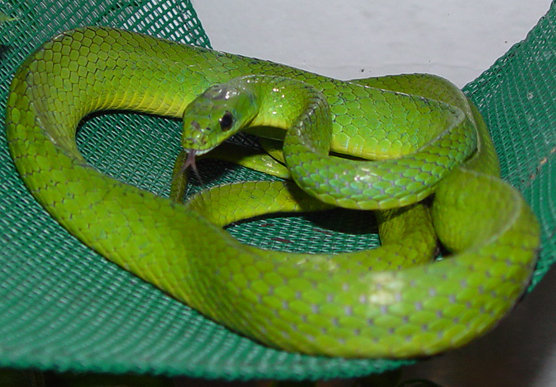

Conservation status
- Least Concern (IUCN 3.1)

Scientific classification
- Kingdom: Animalia
- Phylum: Chordata
- Class: Reptilia
- Order: Squamata
- Suborder: Serpentes
- Family: Colubridae
- Genus: Ptyas
- Species: P. major

Binomial name
- Ptyas major (Günther, 1858)

Synonyms
- List: Cyclophis major Günther, 1858; Herpetodryas chloris Hallowell, 1861; Ablabes major – Boettger, 1894; Entechinus major – Cope, 1895; Liopeltis major – Stejneger, 1907; Liopeltis major bicarinata Maki, 1931; Eurypholis major – Pope, 1935; Opheodrys major – M.A. Smith, 1943; Cyclophiops major – Ota, 1991

= Chinese green snake =

Greater green snake

Species of snake

The Chinese green snake (Ptyas major) is a species of snake in the family Colubridae.

Clip

== Description ==
The Chinese green snake is a slender, medium-sized snake, averaging 75–90 cm (2½-3 feet) in total length, but occasionally growing to 120 cm (4 feet). Bright green above; ventral scales greenish-yellow. Dorsal scales smooth except that males have several mid-dorsal scale rows keeled. Some specimens have scattered black spots on dorsum. Dead specimens often turn bluish.

== Distribution and habitat ==
The Chinese green snake can be found in central and southern China (Hainan, Henan, Gansu, Anhui, Sichuan, Fujian, Guangdong, Guangxi, Guizhou, Hunan, Hubei, Jiangxi, Jiangsu, Shaanxi, Zhejiang, Hong Kong), Taiwan, northern Vietnam, Laos and Bangladesh (Sylhet, Ratargul Swamp Forest).

It is found in humid forests and farmland.

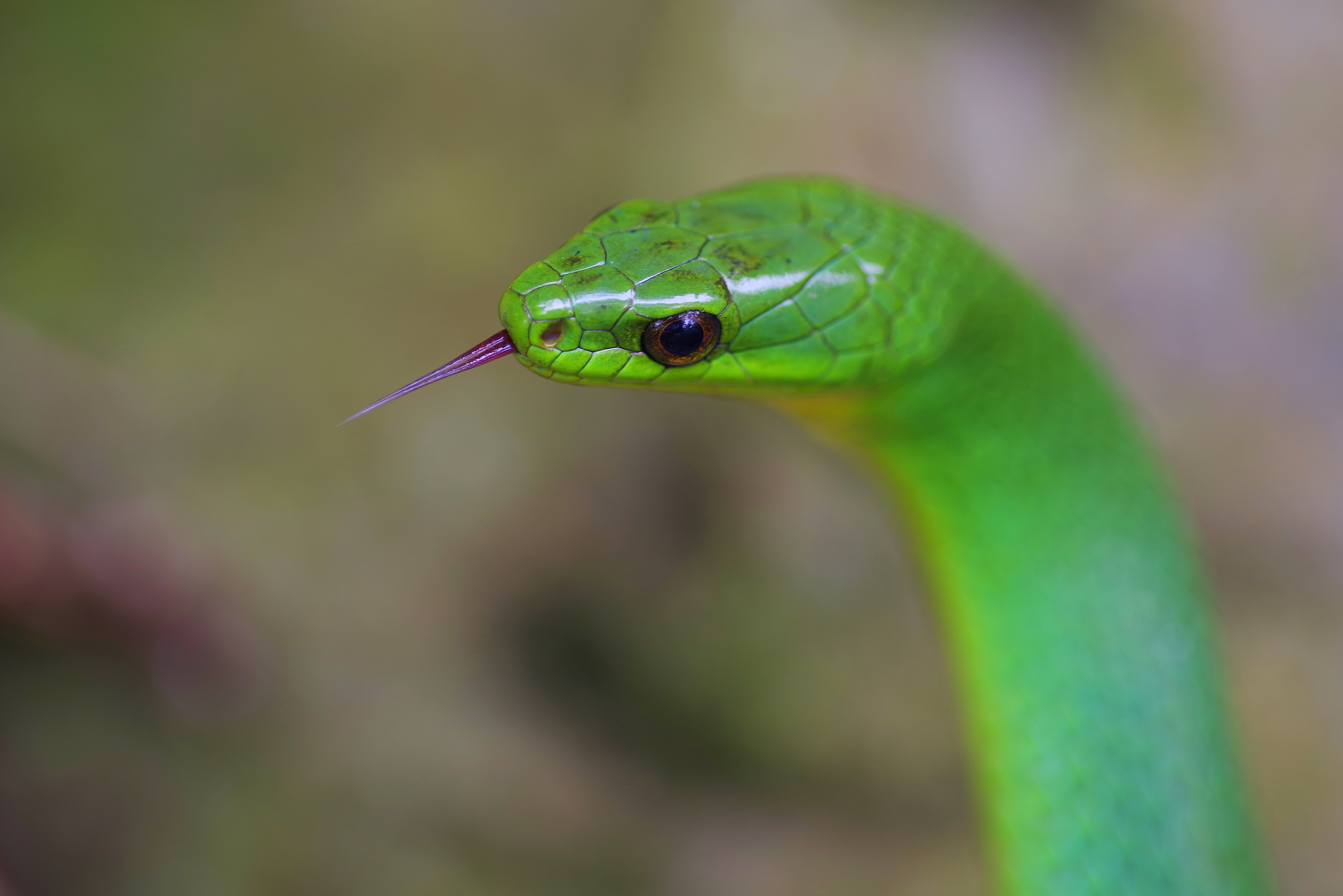
Taiwan

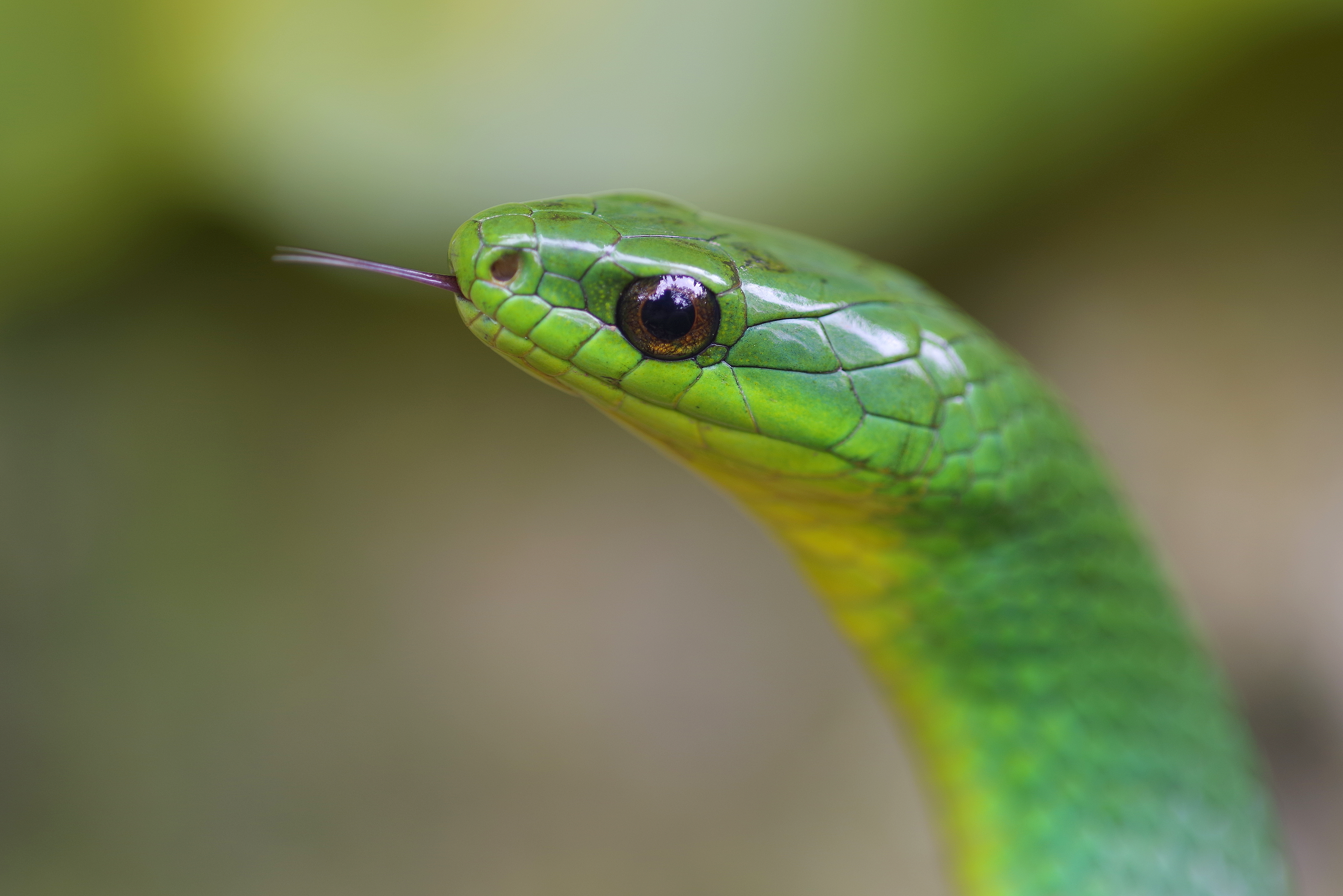
Taiwan

== Behaviour and ecology ==
The Chinese green snake is diurnal and semi-arboreal. When encountered, they are mild-mannered and rarely bite.

=== Feeding ===
Their diet includes earthworms, insect larvae, and other soft-bodied invertebrates.

=== Reproduction ===
They are oviparous, laying 2–16 eggs per clutch. Young snakes hatch in about two months.
