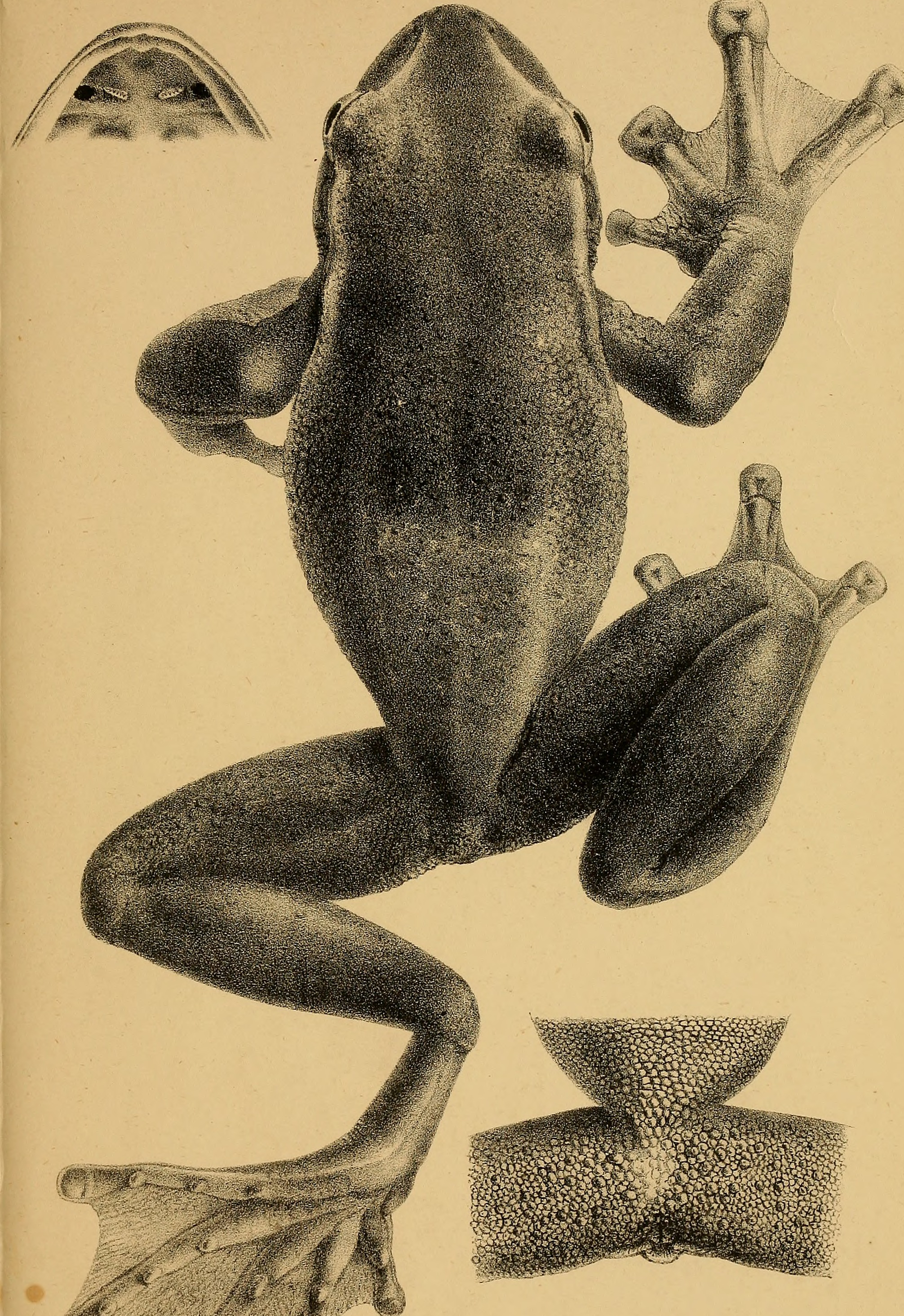

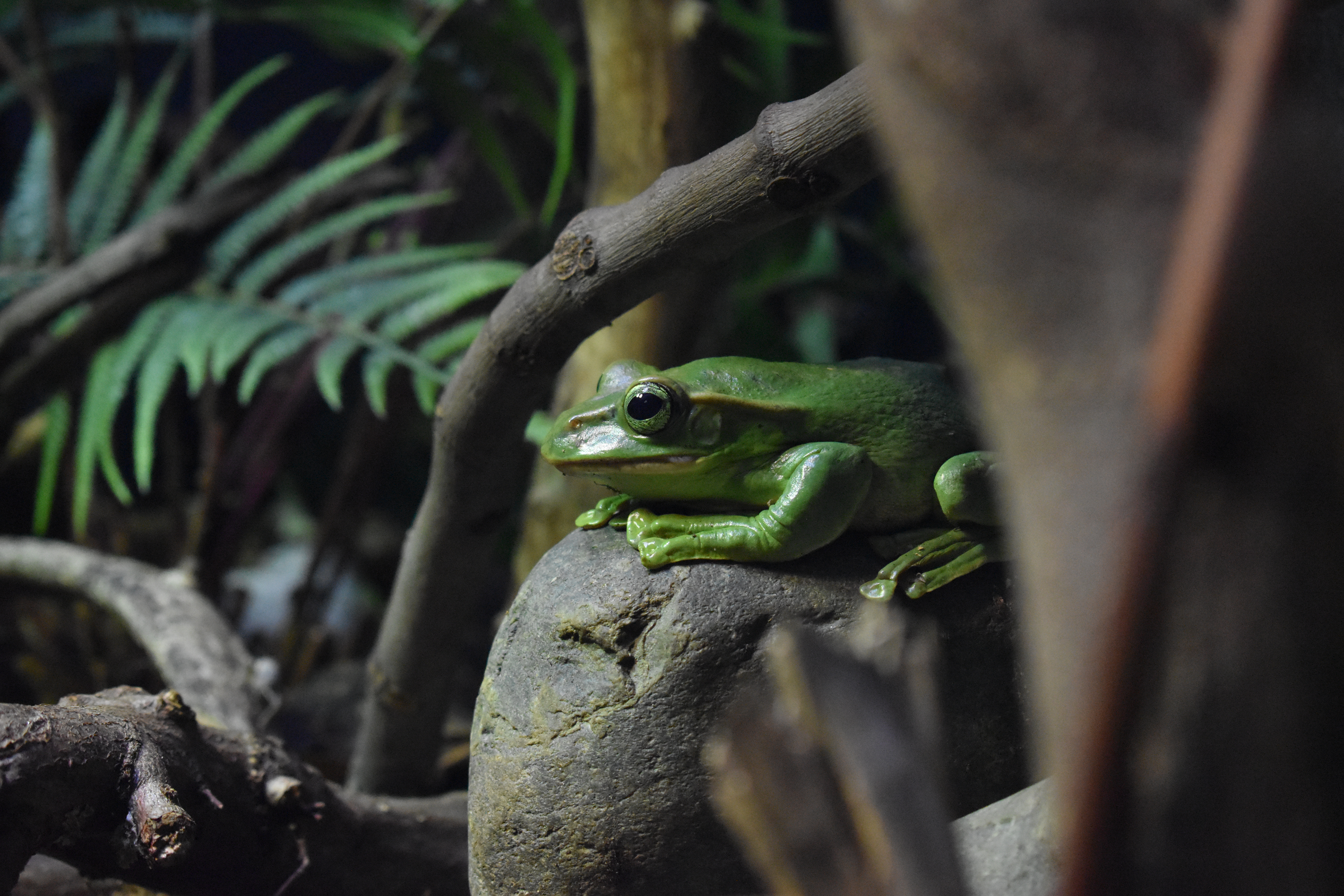

Conservation status
- Least Concern (IUCN 3.1)

Scientific classification
- Kingdom: Animalia
- Phylum: Chordata
- Class: Amphibia
- Order: Anura
- Family: Rhacophoridae
- Genus: Zhangixalus
- Species: Z. feae

Binomial name
- Zhangixalus feae Boulenger, 1893

Synonyms
- Rhacophorus feae Boulenger, 1893; Polypedates feae (Boulenger, 1893)

= Zhangixalus feae =

Species of frog

Zhangixalus feae is a species of frog in the family Rhacophoridae. It is found in southwestern Yunnan (China), northern Laos, northern and central highlands of Vietnam, northern Thailand, and Myanmar.

Its natural habitats are closed-canopy evergreen rainforests, but it can adapt to human presence. It has been observed between 600 and 1400 meters above sea level. The frog's range includes protected parks: Hoang Lien National Park, Ngoc Linh Nature Reserve, and Phou Dendin National Biodiversity Conservation Area. This frog is threatened by habitat loss associated with road and infrastructure construction and tourism. People occasionally collect this frog to eat or to keep and breed for the pet trade, but it is unclear if this still poses a threat. Zoos sometimes display this frog because of its striking coloration.

Individuals of Zhangixalus feae are capable of gliding by spreading the webbing between their fingers and toes. They eat small invertebrates, including insects, spiders, and millipedes.

== Etymology ==
The name of the genus honors Zhang Ya-Ping from the Chinese Academy of Sciences, in recognition to his contributions to biodiversity and evolution research in China, in combination with ixalus, a common generic root for tree frogs. The specific name feae honors Leonardo Fea, an Italian explorer, zoologist, and naturalist.
