= Rhacophorus hoanglienensis =

Conservation status
- Least Concern (IUCN 3.1)

Scientific classification
- Kingdom: Animalia
- Phylum: Chordata
- Class: Amphibia
- Order: Anura
- Family: Rhacophoridae
- Genus: Rhacophorus
- Species: R. hoanglienensis

Binomial name
- Rhacophorus hoanglienensis Orlov, Lathrop, Murphy & Ho, 2001

Species of frog

Rhacophorus hoanglienensis, also known as the Honglien Frog, is a species of frog in the family Rhacophoridae found in Vietnam and possibly China. Its natural habitat is subtropical or tropical moist montane forests. It is threatened by habitat loss.
