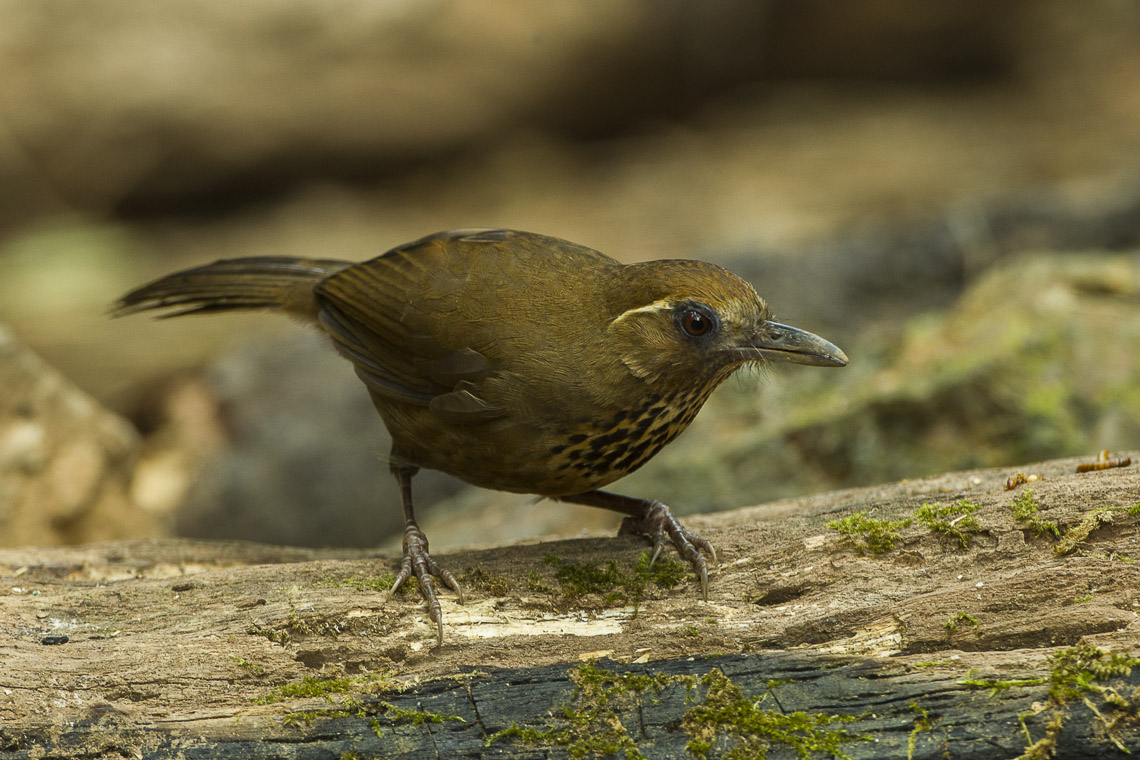

Conservation status
- Least Concern (IUCN 3.1)

Scientific classification
- Kingdom: Animalia
- Phylum: Chordata
- Class: Aves
- Order: Passeriformes
- Family: Leiothrichidae
- Genus: Garrulax
- Species: G. merulinus

Binomial name
- Garrulax merulinus Blyth, 1851

= Spot-breasted laughingthrush =

Species of bird

The spot-breasted laughingthrush (Garrulax merulinus) is a species of bird in the family Leiothrichidae. It is found in Yunnan, Northeast India, Laos, Myanmar, north-west Thailand, and northern Vietnam. Its natural habitats are subtropical or tropical moist lowland forests and subtropical or tropical moist montane forests.

The orange-breasted laughingthrush (S. annamensis) of south-central Vietnam was formerly regarded as a subspecies of this bird but is now often treated as a separate species.
