= Gekko palmatus =

Scientific classification
- Kingdom: Animalia
- Phylum: Chordata
- Class: Reptilia
- Order: Squamata
- Suborder: Gekkota
- Family: Gekkonidae
- Genus: Gekko
- Species: G. palmatus

Binomial name
- Gekko palmatus Boulenger, 1907

Species of lizard

Gekko palmatus, also known as the palm gecko or the palmated gecko, is a species of gecko. It is endemic to Vietnam.
