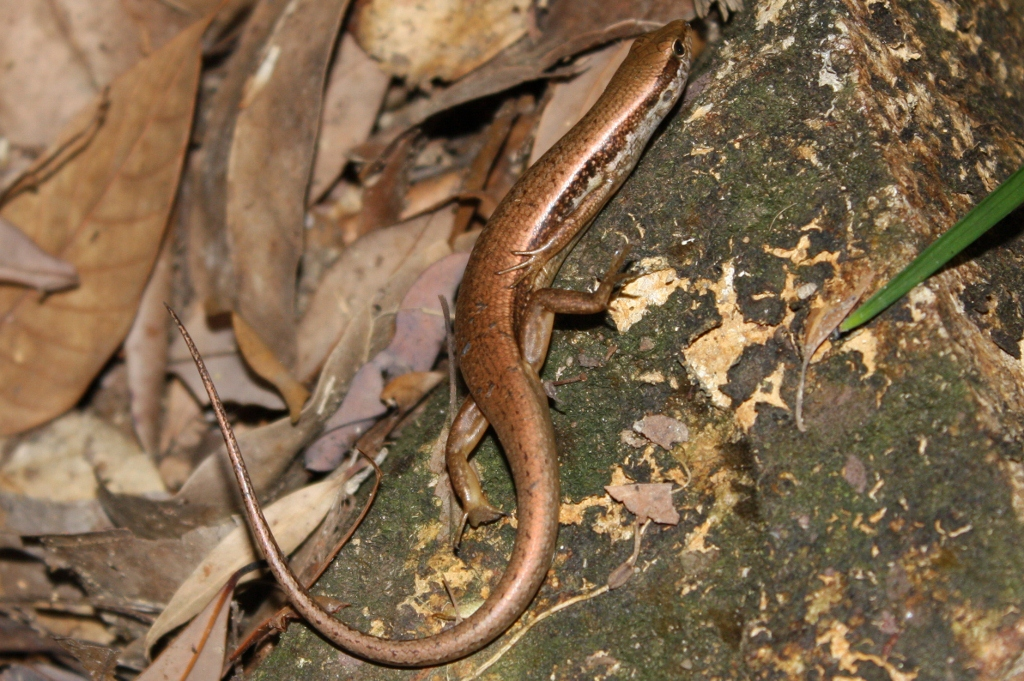

Conservation status
- Least Concern (IUCN 3.1)

Scientific classification
- Kingdom: Animalia
- Phylum: Chordata
- Class: Reptilia
- Order: Squamata
- Family: Scincidae
- Genus: Sphenomorphus
- Species: S. indicus

Binomial name
- Sphenomorphus indicus (Gray, 1853)

= Sphenomorphus indicus =

Indian forest skink

Species of lizard

Sphenomorphus indicus (Indian forest skink) is a species of skink.

== Description ==
Its habit is lacertiform; the distance between the end of the snout and the fore limb contained about 1.6 times in the distance between axilla and groin. Snout short, obtuse; loreal region nearly vertical. Lower eyelid scaly. Nostril pierced in a single nasal, or between a nasal and a postnasal; no supranasal; rostral convex, largely m contact with the frontonasal, which is broader than long, and forms a narrow suture with the frontal; the latter as long as frontoparietal and parietals together, in contact with the first, second, and third supraoculars; 4 large supraoculars, followed by 2 very small ones; first supraocular not much longer than second; 9 or 10 supracilianes, first largest; frontoparietals and interparietal distinct, former a little longer than latter; parietals forming a short suture behind the interparietal; no nuchals; fifth and sixth upper labials largest and below the eye. Ear-opening oval, smaller than eye-opening; no auricular lobules. 36 or 38 smooth scales round the middle of the body, laterals smallest. A pair of large pre-anals. When the limbs are pressed against the body, the hind limb reaches the elbow or not quite so far. Digits rather elongate, compressed; subdigital lamellae smooth or obtusely keeled, 17 to 20 under the fourth toe. Tail almost twice as long as head and body. Brown or olive above, uniform or with scattered darker dots; sides of head and body dark brown, light-margined above; usually with large light spots; lower surface whitish. From snout to vent 3.5 inches; tail

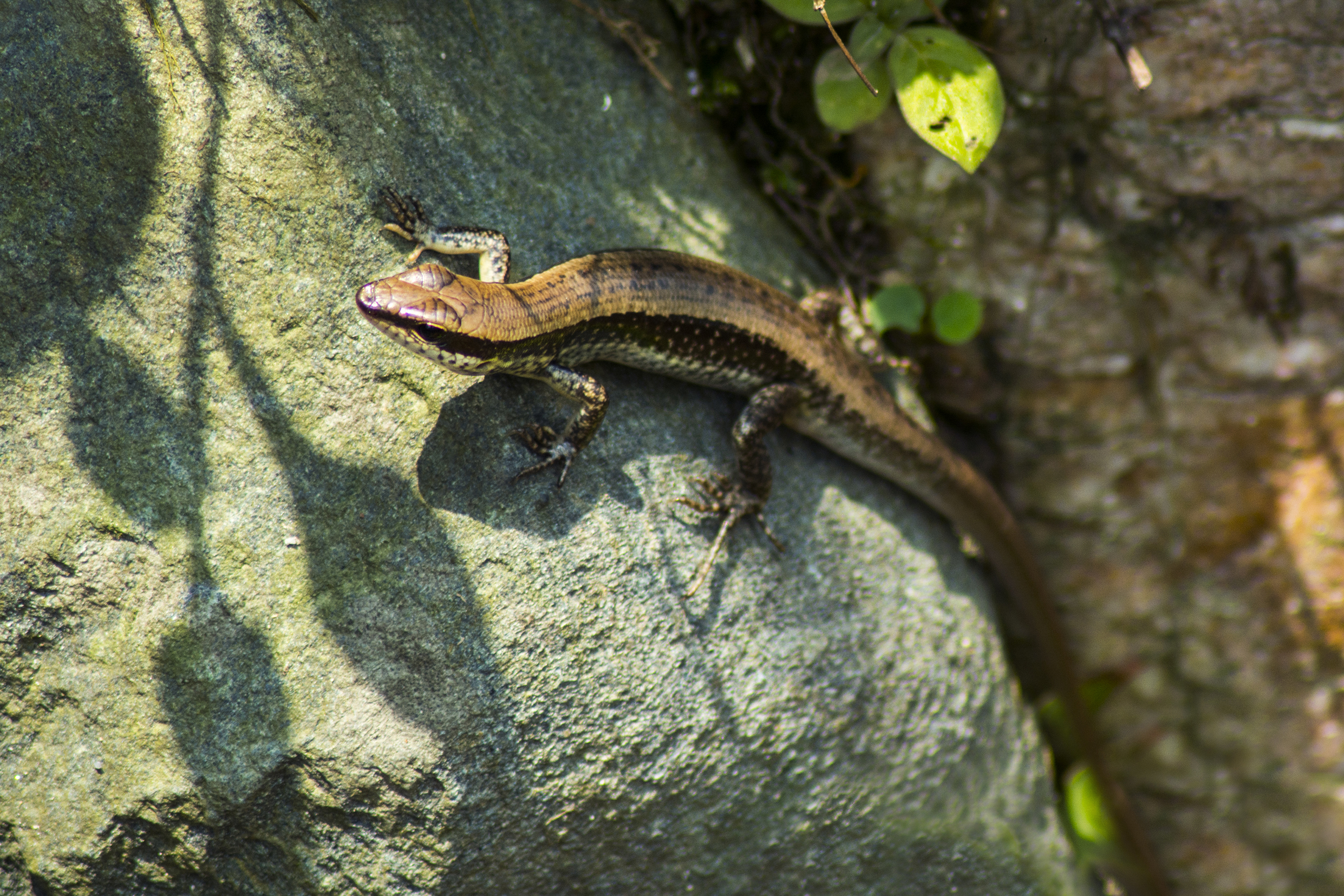
Indian forest skink

== Distribution ==
S China (incl. Hainan, west to E Xizang = Tibet, and north to Henan, Shaanxi, and Gansu, Guangdong: Nan Ao Island), Bangladesh, Bhutan, Taiwan, Thailand (likely in Bilauk Tuang mountain fide Taylor 1963: 1020), Vietnam, India (Darjeeling, Sikkim) east to Indochina and south to W Malaysia

Type locality: Sikkim, Himalayas.
