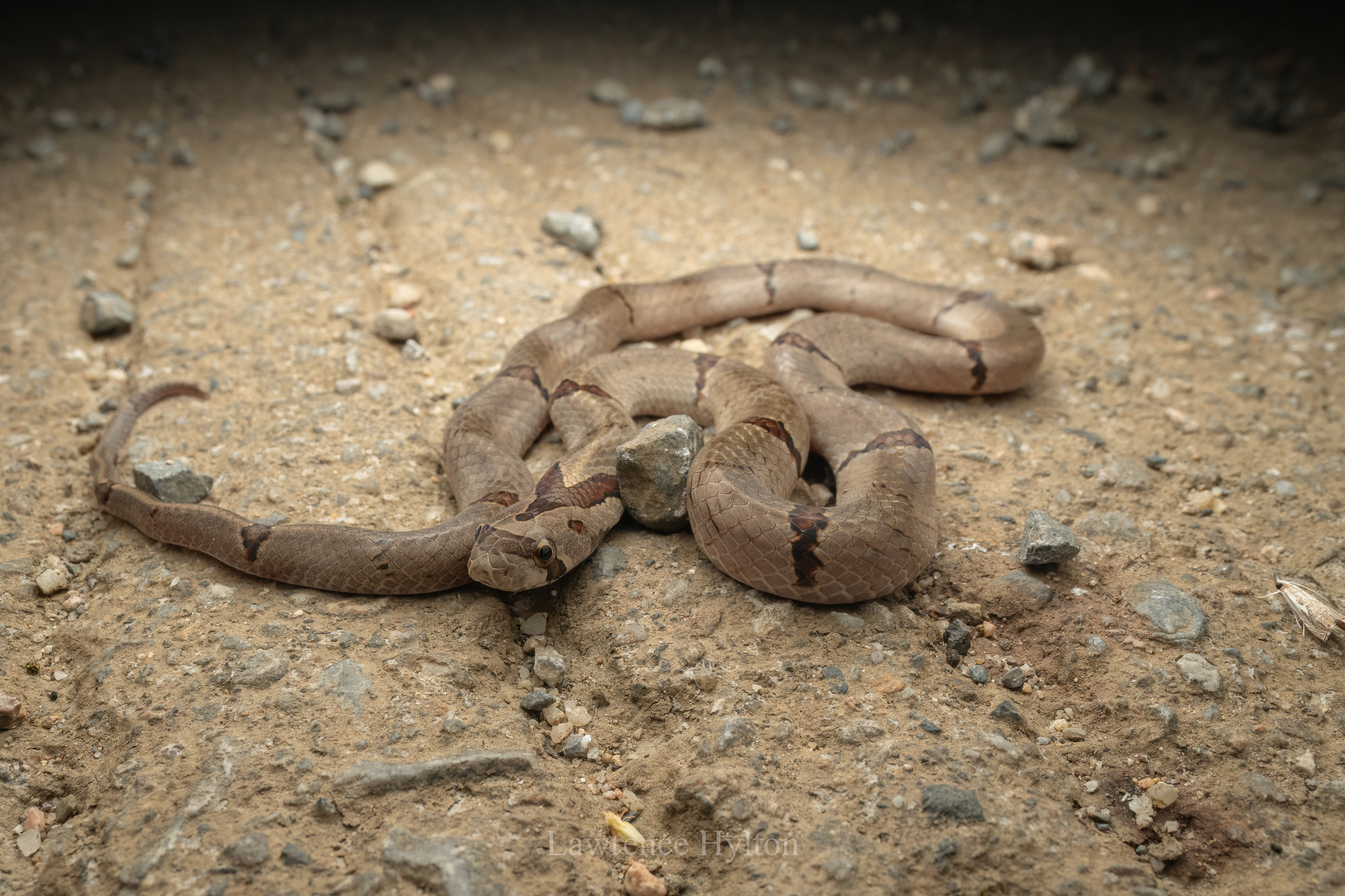
- Oligodon chinensis in China

Conservation status
- Least Concern (IUCN 3.1)

Scientific classification
- Kingdom: Animalia
- Phylum: Chordata
- Class: Reptilia
- Order: Squamata
- Suborder: Serpentes
- Family: Colubridae
- Genus: Oligodon
- Species: O. chinensis

Binomial name
- Oligodon chinensis (Günther, 1888)

= Chinese kukri snake =

Species of snake

The Chinese kukri snake (Oligodon chinensis) is a species of snake of the family Colubridae.

== Geographic range ==
The snake is found in China and Vietnam. Pham, et al. (2014) reported "In Vietnam, this is a widespread species known from Lao Cai and Lang Son in the North southwards to Quang Binh and Gia Lai provinces" and provided a morphological description.

== Ecology ==
Found in forest floor habitat in Vietnam; the surrounding habitat was secondary karst forest.
