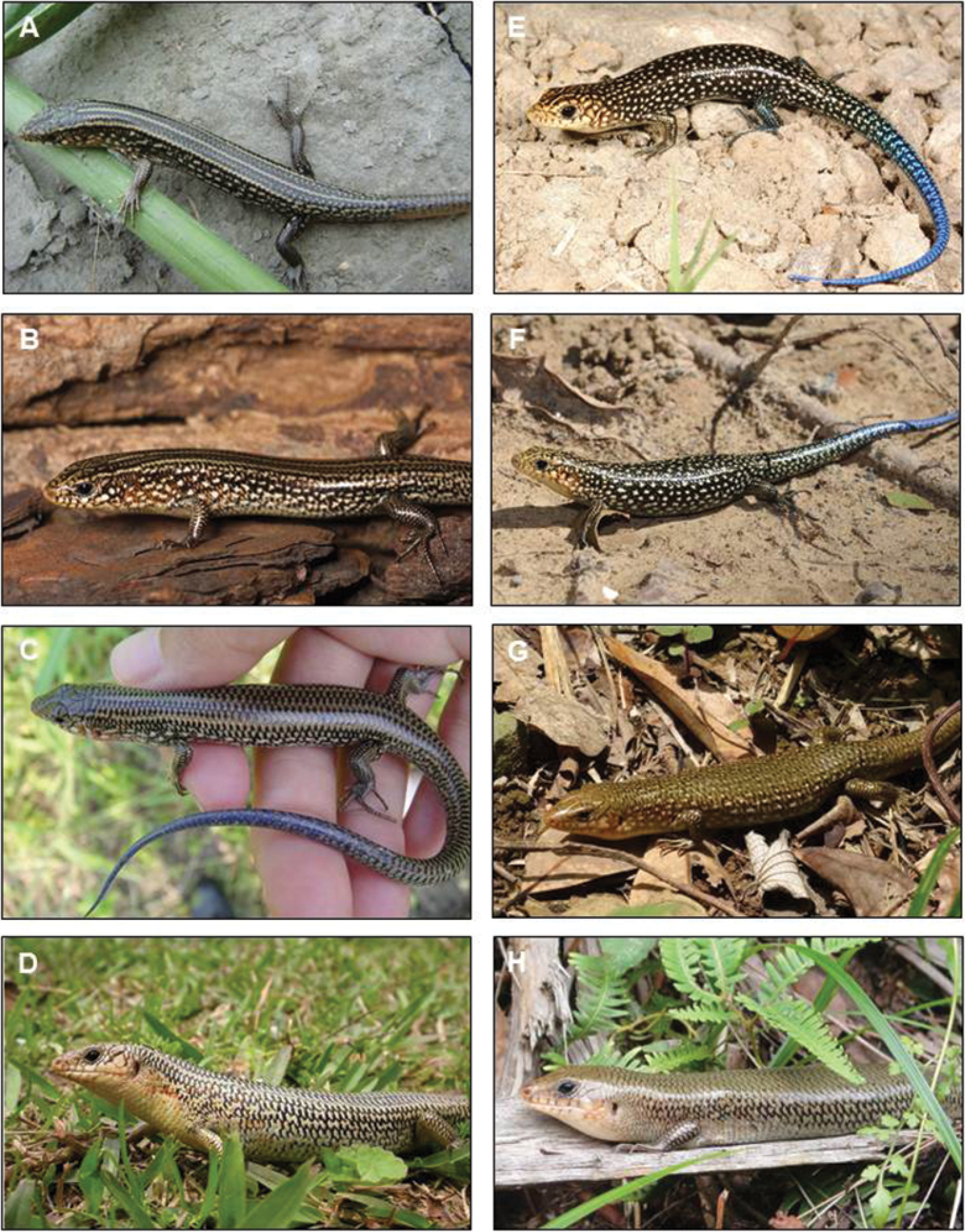
- Plestiodon chinensis formosensis (left) and Plestiodon leucostictus (right)

Conservation status
- Near Threatened (IUCN 3.1)

Scientific classification
- Kingdom: Animalia
- Phylum: Chordata
- Class: Reptilia
- Order: Squamata
- Suborder: Scinciformata
- Infraorder: Scincomorpha
- Family: Scincidae
- Genus: Plestiodon
- Species: P. leucostictus

Binomial name
- Plestiodon leucostictus (Hikida, 1988)

Synonyms
- Eumeces chinensis leucostictus Hikida, 1988; Plestiodon chinensis leucostictus (Hikida, 1988)

= Plestiodon leucostictus =

Species of reptile

Plestiodon leucostictus, the Chinese blue-tailed skink, is a species of skink. It is endemic to Taiwan and occurs in the eastern part of the main island as well as on Green Island. As currently delimited, it includes Plestiodon chinensis formosensis from the eastern parts of Taiwan and Eumeces chinensis leucostictus originally described from Green Island; the taxonomic position of Plestiodon chinensis formosensis from western Taiwan is unsettled.

Plestiodon leucostictus mainly occurs in cultivated land or large areas of open grassland. It is common on Green Island, but rare on the mainland.
