= Pseudoxenodon karlschmidti =

Conservation status
- Least Concern (IUCN 3.1)

Scientific classification
- Kingdom: Animalia
- Phylum: Chordata
- Class: Reptilia
- Order: Squamata
- Suborder: Serpentes
- Family: Colubridae
- Genus: Pseudoxenodon
- Species: P. karlschmidti

Binomial name
- Pseudoxenodon karlschmidti Pope, 1928

Species of snake

Pseudoxenodon karlschmidti, commonly known as the Chinese bamboo snake and Karl Schmidt's false cobra, is a species of snake in the family Colubridae. The species is found in southern China and northern Vietnam. There are three recognized subspecies.

== Etymology ==
The specific name, karlschmidti, is in honor of American herpetologist Karl Patterson Schmidt.

== Habitat ==
The preferred natural habitat of P. karlschmidti is near streams in forest and shrubland, at altitudes of 500–1,200 m (1,600–3,900 ft), but it has also been found in cropland.

== Diet ==
P. karlschmidti preys predominately upon frogs.

== Reproduction ==
P. karlschmidti is oviparous.

== Subspecies ==
The following three subspecies are recognized as being valid, including the nominotypical subspecies.

- Pseudoxenodon karlschmidti karlschmidti Pope, 1928
- Pseudoxenodon karlschmidti popei Gressitt, 1936
- Pseudoxenodon karlschmidti sinii Fan, 1931
