= Zhangixalus duboisi =

Conservation status
- Vulnerable (IUCN 3.1)

Scientific classification
- Kingdom: Animalia
- Phylum: Chordata
- Class: Amphibia
- Order: Anura
- Family: Rhacophoridae
- Genus: Zhangixalus
- Species: Z. duboisi

Binomial name
- Zhangixalus duboisi (Ohler, Marquis, Swan & Grosjean, 2000)

Synonyms
- Rhacophorus duboisi Ohler, Marquis, Swan & Grosjean, 2000; Polypedates pingbianensis Kou, Hu & Gao, 2001

Species of frog

Zhangixalus duboisi is a species of frog in the family Rhacophoridae found in China and Vietnam. Its natural habitats are subtropical or tropical moist montane forests, freshwater marshes, intermittent freshwater marshes, and heavily degraded former forests. It is threatened by habitat loss.

== Habitat ==
This frog lives in montaine and submontaine forests. It has been found in areas with evergreen trees or karst zones. It has been found next to ponds, swamps, and seeps. This frog has been observed between 1210 and 2813 meters above sea level.

== Reproduction ==
The male frog digs a hole under a rock and then sings for the female frogs. The female frog lays her eggs in the hole. Adult frogs of both sexes have been observed guarding egg clutches. The tadpoles move into the water after hatching.

== Threats ==
The IUCN classifies this frog as vulnerable to extinction because of its limited range. It is threatened by ongoing habitat loss associated with cardamom farming and infrastructure for tourism. Scientists also cite climate change as a possible threat, given that the frog's high-altitude habitat may preclude migration to cooler areas.

Scientists believe the frog might be vulnerable to capture for sale on the international pet trade because of its distinctive coloration but this has not been recorded happening yet. Other colorful frogs in Zhangixalus and Rhacophorus have been sold as pets for this reason.

== Etymology ==
The name of the genus honors Zhang Ya-Ping from the Chinese Academy of Sciences, in recognition to his contributions to biodiversity and evolution research in China, in combination with ixalus, a common generic root for tree frogs.
