= Odorrana junlianensis =

Conservation status
- Least Concern (IUCN 3.1)

Scientific classification
- Kingdom: Animalia
- Phylum: Chordata
- Class: Amphibia
- Order: Anura
- Family: Ranidae
- Genus: Odorrana
- Species: O. junlianensis

Binomial name
- Odorrana junlianensis Huang, Fei, and Ye, 2001

Synonyms
- Rana junlianensis (Huang, Fei, and Ye, 2001); Huai junlianensis (Huang, Fei, and Ye, 2001)

Species of amphibian

Odorrana junlianensis, also known as the Junlian odorous frog, is a species of frogs in the family Ranidae. It is found in southern China (Guizhou, Yunnan, Chongqing, and Sichuan) and in the northernmost Laos and Vietnam. Its type locality is the eponymous Junlian County in Sichuan.

== Description ==
Odorrana junlianensis are large frogs, with adult males measuring about 69–70 mm (2.7–2.8 in) and adult females 89–102 mm (3.5–4.0 in) in snout–vent length. The overall appearance is moderately slender. The snout is depressed, obtusely pointed in dorsal view and rounded in profile. The tympanum and the canthus rostralis are distinct. The finger tips are expanded into discs. The toe tips are expanded into large triangular discs; the toes are almost fully webbed. Adult male have fine, white spinules forming an 8-shaped figure on the chest. Coloration is dorsally olive-green, usually with brownish dots. The flanks are light brown with dark brown spots. The forelimbs are banded. The venter is light yellow or earthly-yellow; the throat and chest have grayish-brown tiny spinules. The ventral surface of the thigh has deep olive to gray-brown spots.

== Habitat and conservation ==
Odorrana junlianensis occurs in association with large streams in forested areas at elevations of 650–1,500 m (2,130–4,920 ft) above sea level. It breeds in streams. It is threatened by habitat loss caused by logging and smallholder farming activities. It has been recorded from the Phou Louey National Biodiversity Conservation Area in Laos.
