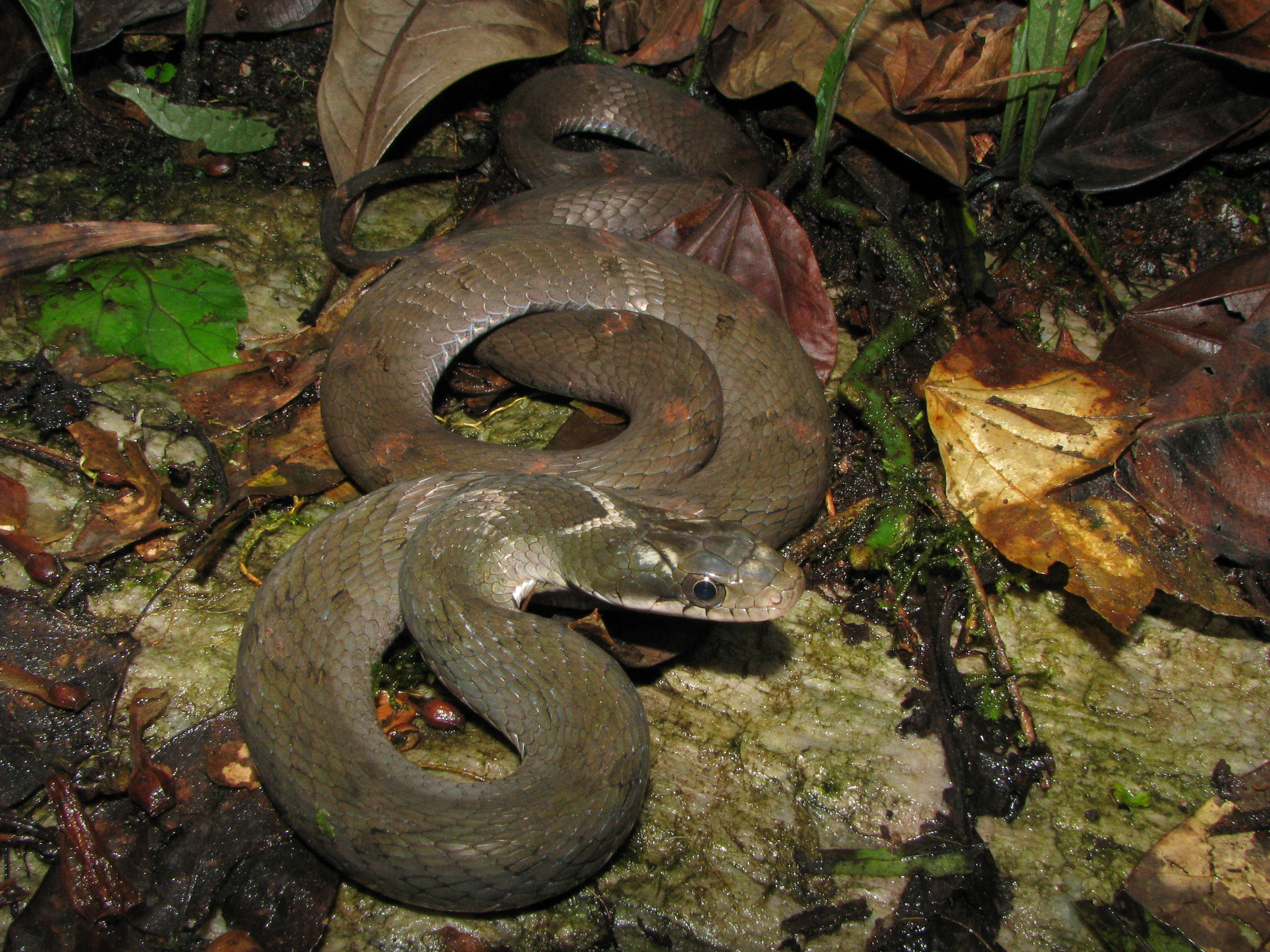
- Pseudoxenodon macrops

Scientific classification
- Kingdom: Animalia
- Phylum: Chordata
- Class: Reptilia
- Order: Squamata
- Suborder: Serpentes
- Family: Colubridae
- Subfamily: Pseudoxenodontinae
- Genus: Pseudoxenodon; Boulenger, 1890

= Pseudoxenodon =

Genus of snakes

Pseudoxenodon is a genus of snakes in the subfamily Pseudoxenodontinae of the family Colubridae. Species in the genus Pseudoxenodon are native to Southeast Asia.

== Species ==
The following six species are recognized as being valid.

- Pseudoxenodon bambusicola T. Vogt, 1922 – bamboo snake
- Pseudoxenodon baramensis (M.A. Smith, 1921) – Baramen bamboo snake
- Pseudoxenodon inornatus (F. Boie, 1827) – dull bamboo snake
- Pseudoxenodon karlschmidti Pope, 1928 – Chinese bamboo snake
- Pseudoxenodon macrops (Blyth, 1855) – large-eyed bamboo snake, big-eyed bamboo snake
- Pseudoxenodon stejnegeri Barbour, 1908 – Stejneger's bamboo snake

Nota bene: A binomial authority in parentheses indicates that the species was originally described in a genus other than Pseudoxenodon.

== Etymology ==
The specific names, karlschmidti and stejnegeri, are in honor of American herpetologists Karl Patterson Schmidt and Leonhard Stejneger, respectively.
