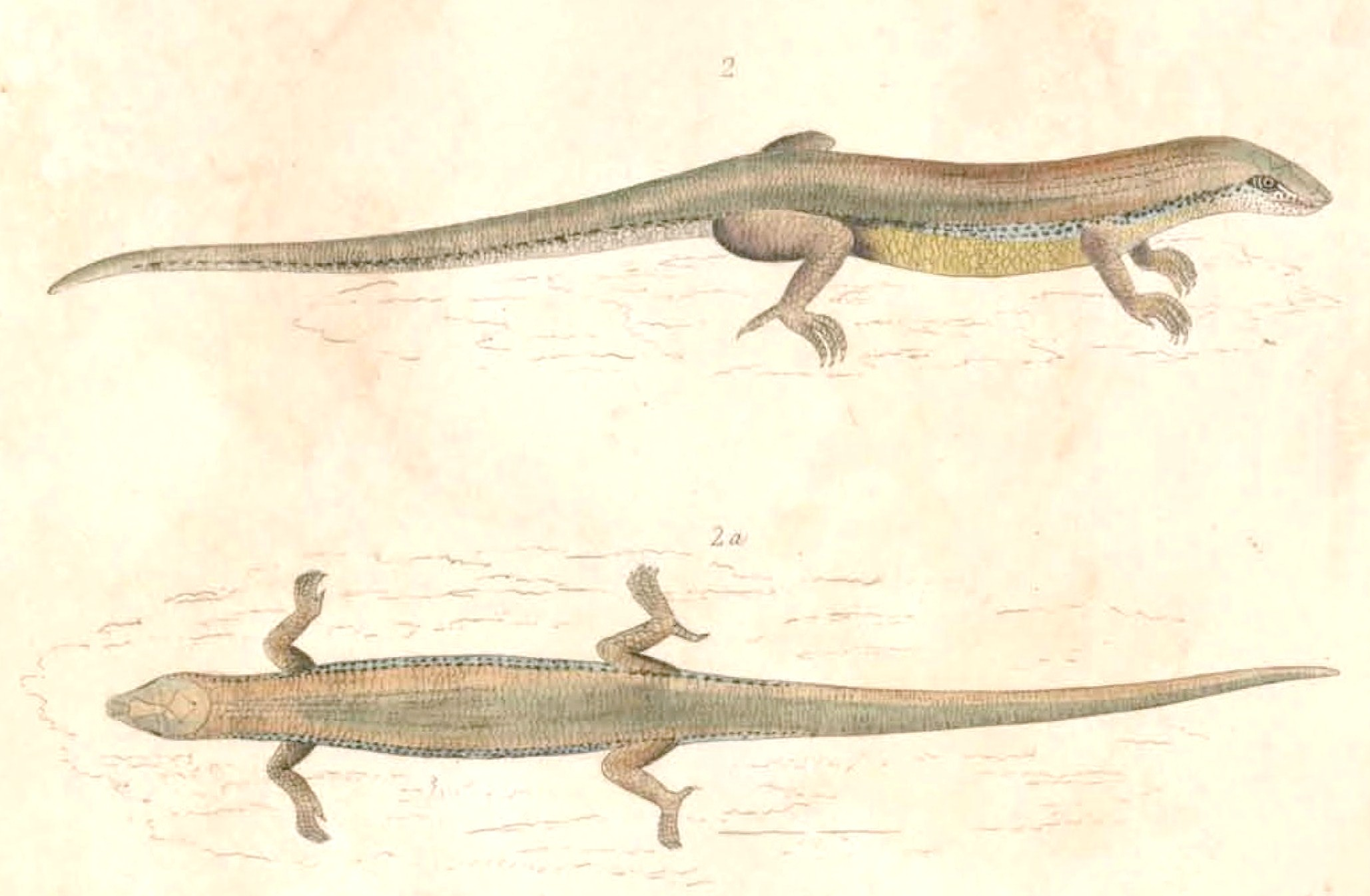

Conservation status
- Least Concern (IUCN 3.1)

Scientific classification
- Kingdom: Animalia
- Phylum: Chordata
- Class: Reptilia
- Order: Squamata
- Suborder: Scinciformata
- Infraorder: Scincomorpha
- Family: Scincidae
- Genus: Plestiodon
- Species: P. chinensis

Binomial name
- Plestiodon chinensis (JE Gray, 1838)

Synonyms
- Tiliqua chinensis Gray, 1838; Eumeces chinensis (Gray, 1838)

= Plestiodon chinensis =

Species of reptile

Plestiodon chinensis, the Chinese blue-tailed skink, is a species of lizard which is found in China, western Taiwan, and northern Vietnam.

== Entomology ==
P. chinensis was named after the skink's home in China.

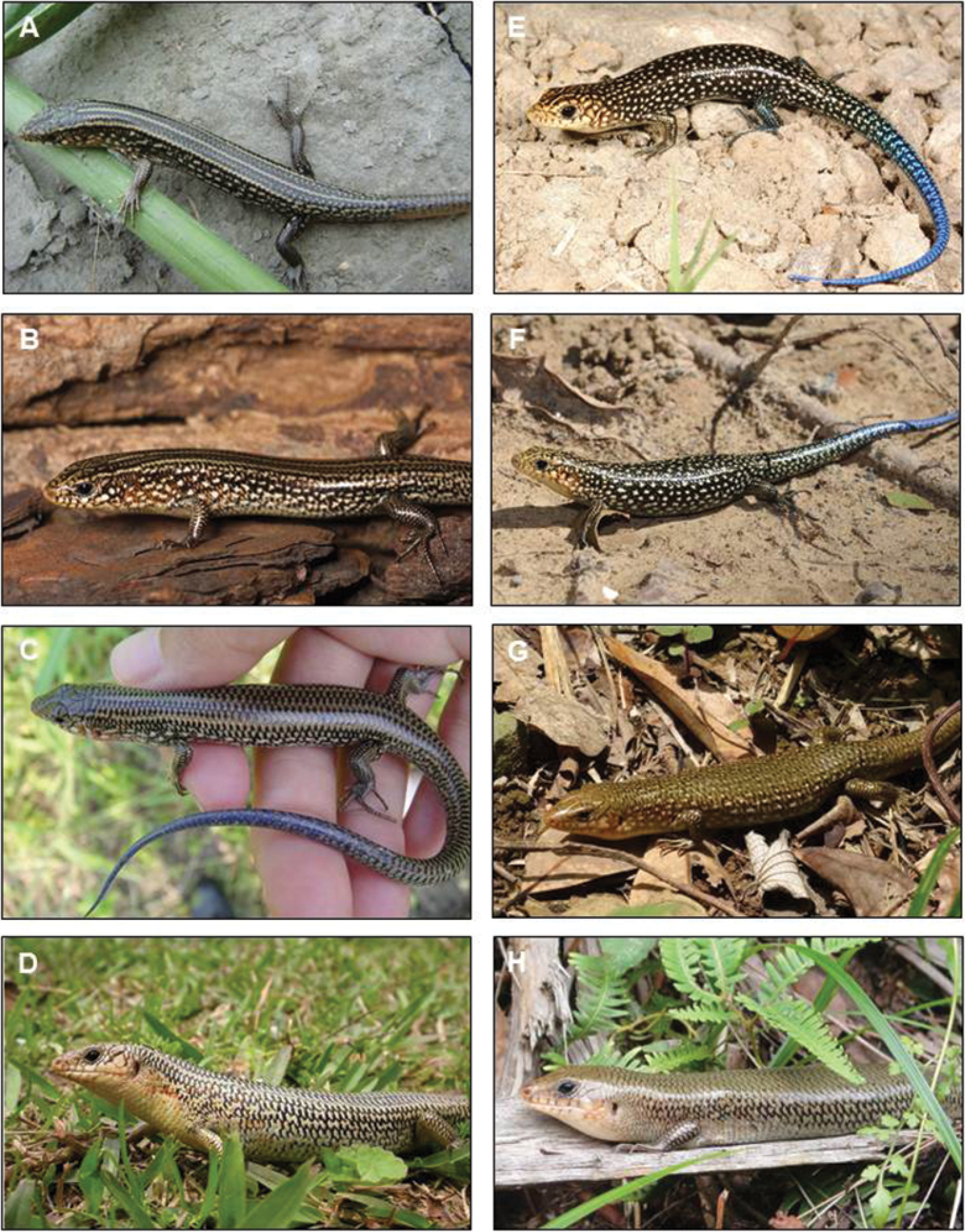
Plestiodon chinensis formosensis (left) and Plestiodon leucostictus, formerly a subspecies of P. chinensis (right).

== Subspecies ==
There are four subspecies (though not all with universal recognition):

- Plestiodon chinensis chinensis (Gray, 1838) – China, Vietnam
- Plestiodon chinensis daishanensis (Mao, 1983) – Zhoushan Islands, China
- Plestiodon chinensis formosensis Van Denburgh, 1912 – Taiwan
- Plestiodon chinensis pulcher Duméril & Bibron, 1839 – China

Plestiodon chinensis formosensis from eastern Taiwan were in 2017 found to be identical with Plestiodon chinensis leucostictus, now recognized as Plestiodon leucostictus.

== Description ==
The Chinese blue-tailed skink has an average snout-to-vent length (SVL) of 13 cm, with a total length of 35 cm. It is large and stout, with a broad head and a pale white underside. As juveniles mature, their body undergoes a change in color from a dark brown with three light dorsal stripes and a blue tail to a fully mature brownish green, complete with reddish spots on the flanks.
