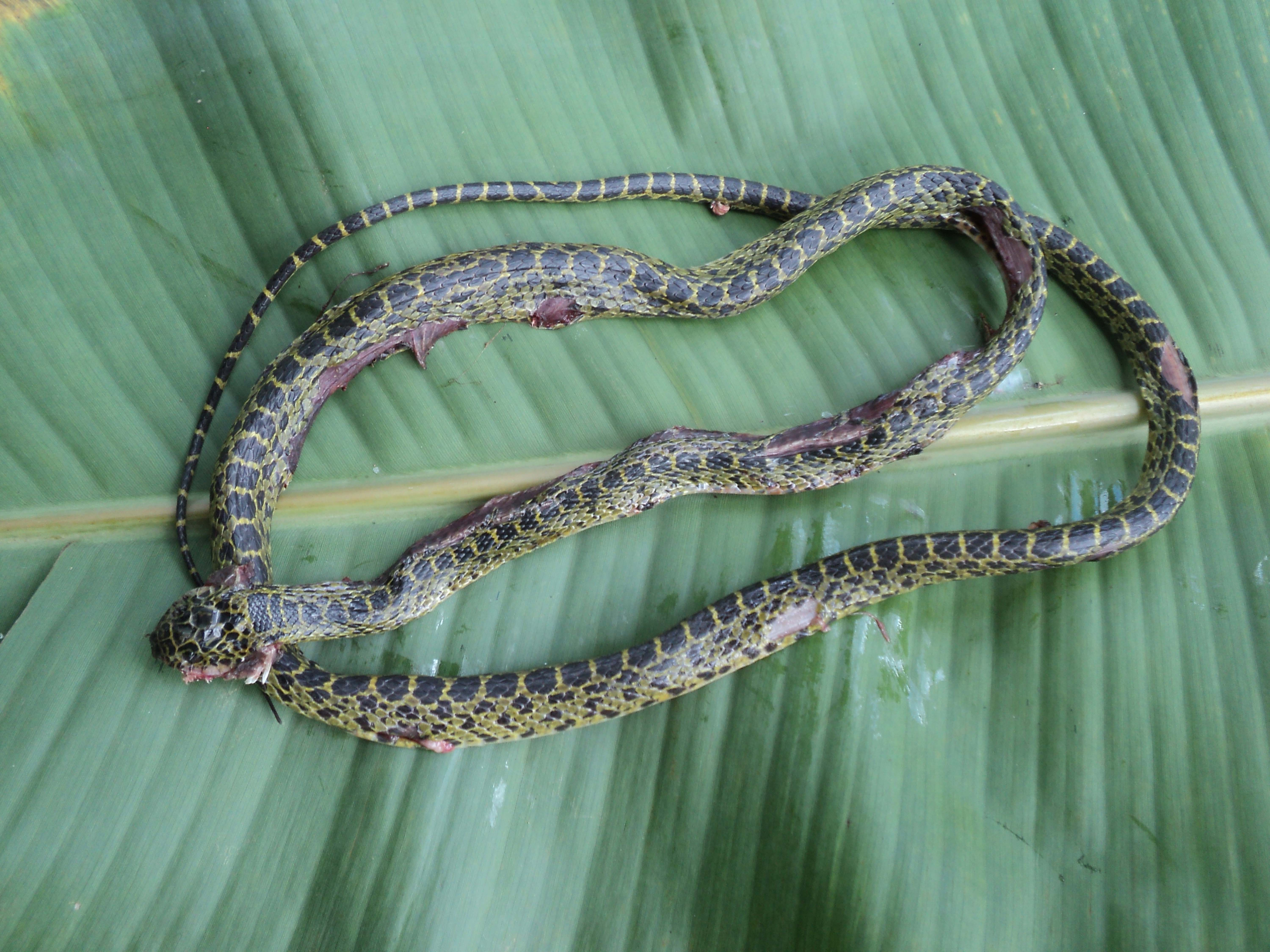

Conservation status
- Least Concern (IUCN 3.1)

Scientific classification
- Kingdom: Animalia
- Phylum: Chordata
- Class: Reptilia
- Order: Squamata
- Suborder: Serpentes
- Family: Colubridae
- Subfamily: Colubrinae
- Genus: Lycodon
- Species: L. meridionalis

Binomial name
- Lycodon meridionalis (Bourret, 1935)

Synonyms
- Dinodon meridionale Orlov & Ryabov, 2004; Dinodon rufozonatum meridionale Bourret, 1935; Lycodon meridionale Siler et al. 2013 (by implication)

= Lycodon meridionalis =

Species of snake

Lycodon meridionalis, the Vietnamese large-toothed snake, is a species of snake in the family Colubridae.

== Distribution ==
It is found in Vietnam, Laos, and China.
