= Pseudoxenodon bambusicola =

Conservation status
- Least Concern (IUCN 3.1)

Scientific classification
- Kingdom: Animalia
- Phylum: Chordata
- Class: Reptilia
- Order: Squamata
- Suborder: Serpentes
- Family: Colubridae
- Genus: Pseudoxenodon
- Species: P. bambusicola

Binomial name
- Pseudoxenodon bambusicola Vogt, 1922

Species of snake

Pseudoxenodon bambusicola, commonly known as the bamboo snake or bamboo false cobra, is a species of snake in the family Colubridae. The species is found in China, Vietnam, Laos, and Thailand .

== Description ==
These snakes can range in color from light brown to a grey purple with black or red bands down its body. Being that it is a false cobra, it will raise up when it feels threatened and spread its neck into a small hood, which has the shape of a pointed oval ring. Additionally, it has a black band across its large circular eyes. These snakes can reach up to 100 cm (3.5 feet) in length.

== Habitat ==
This snake can be found in northern Thailand, northern Laos, northern Vietnam and southern China. They reside in wetlands near rocky terrain, moving mostly through leaf litter and vegetation close to the ground where they can stay hidden from predators.

== Diet ==
This species has been observed eating frogs, but it likely also eats small lizards, and insects when it's a hatchling.

== Behaviour ==
This snake is active during the day, hunting hidden in vegetation, ambushing small prey. When threatened this snake tends to react aggressively rearing up and flattening its hood. It will strike repeatedly with several false bites before it will engage a true strike. It is rear fanged so its bite, while painful and latching, is generally harmless. It is mildly venomous, but with the fang position and potency, there have been no known injuries or deaths attributed to this species.

== Conservation ==
These snakes are quite prevalent throughout their range and currently do not face any threats to their habitat or breeding population.
