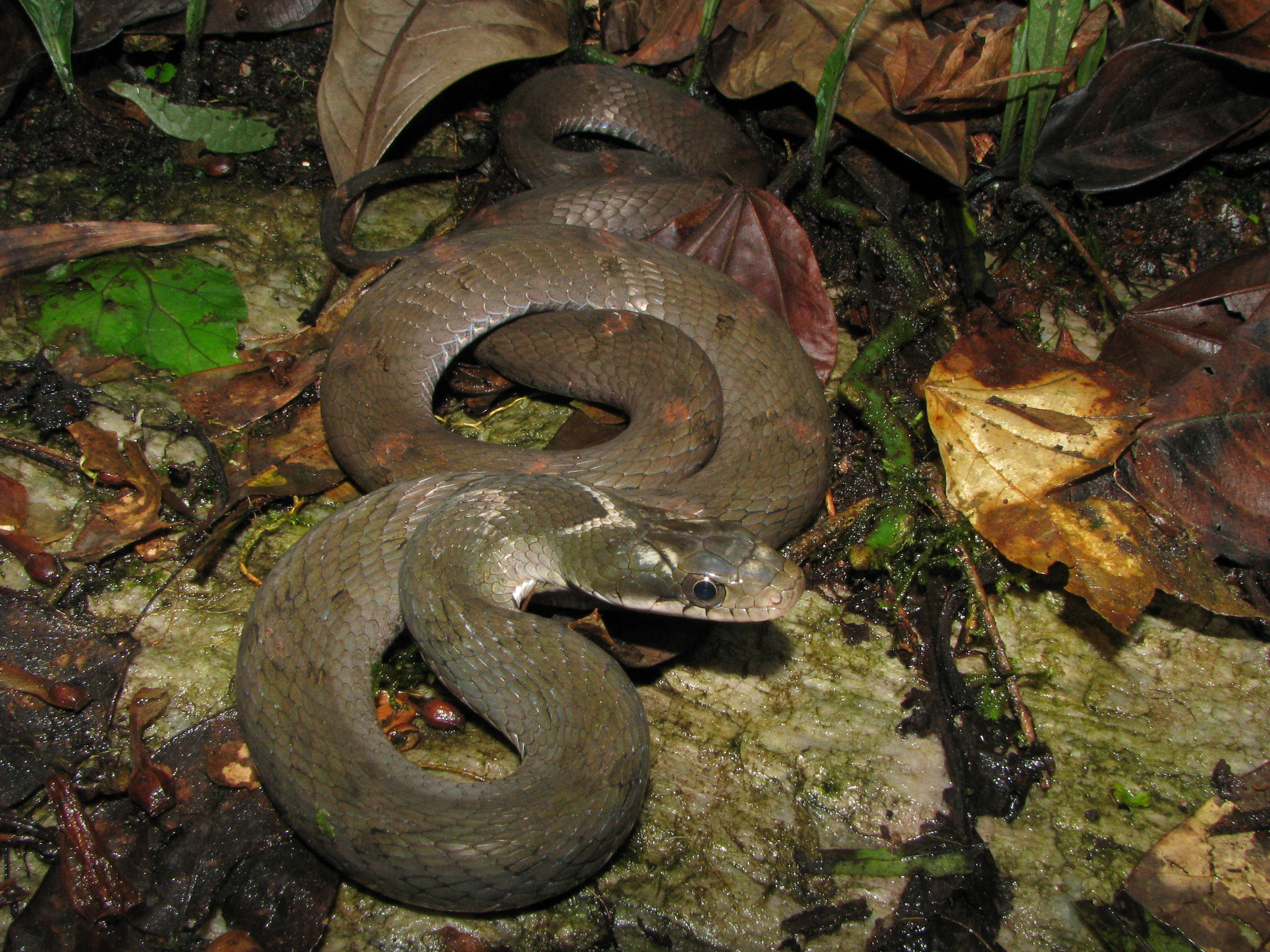

Conservation status
- Least Concern (IUCN 3.1)

Scientific classification
- Kingdom: Animalia
- Phylum: Chordata
- Class: Reptilia
- Order: Squamata
- Suborder: Serpentes
- Family: Colubridae
- Genus: Pseudoxenodon
- Species: P. macrops

Binomial name
- Pseudoxenodon macrops (Blyth, 1855)

Synonyms
- Tropidonotus macrops Blyth, 1855; Xenodon macrophthalmus Günther, 1858 (part); Tropidonotus sikkimensis Anderson, 1871; Pseudoxenodon macrops — Boulenger, 1890

= Pseudoxenodon macrops =

Species of snake

Pseudoxenodon macrops, commonly known as the large-eyed bamboo snake or the big-eyed bamboo snake, is a species of mildly venomous rear-fanged snake endemic to Asia.

== Description ==
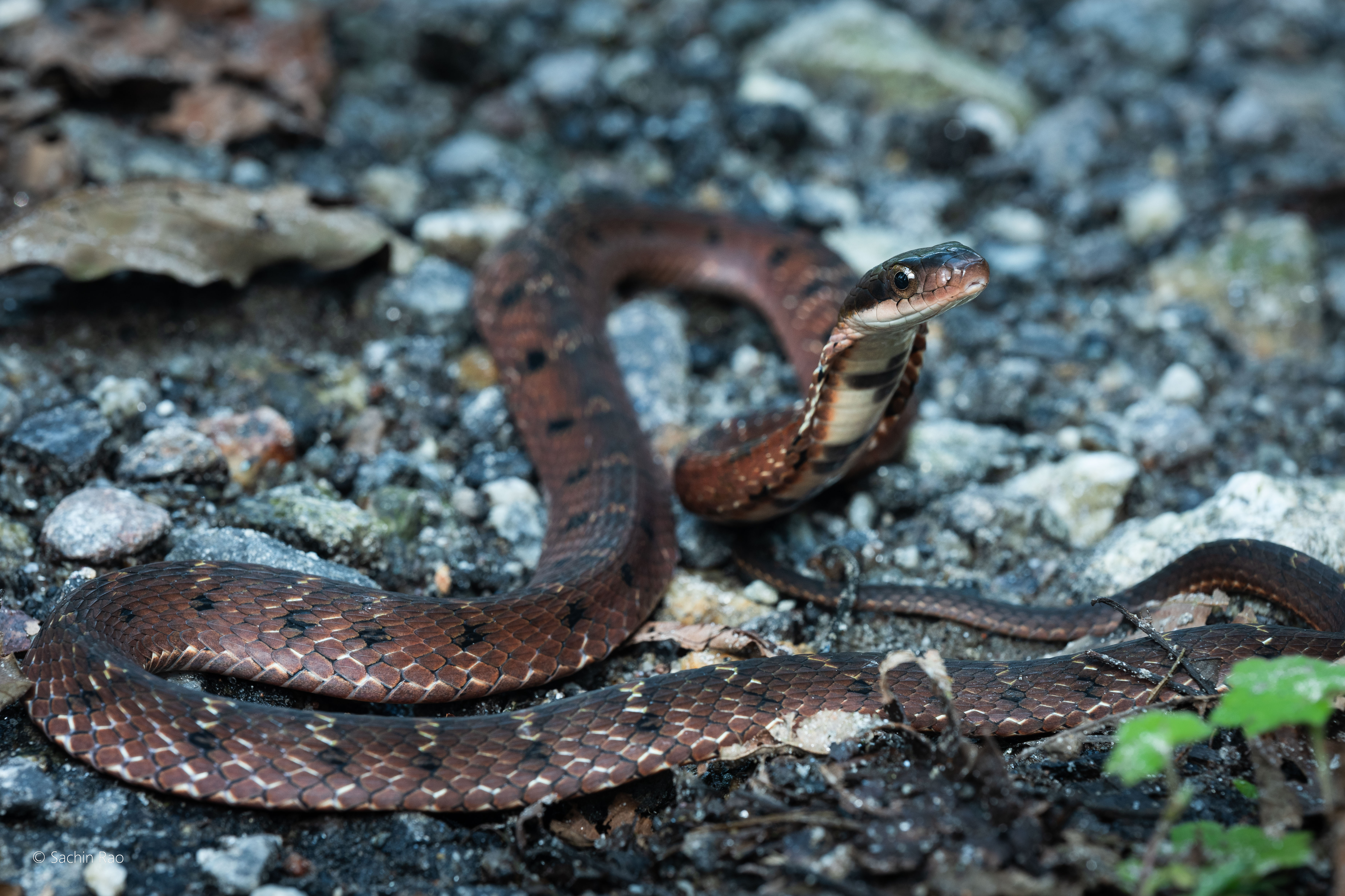

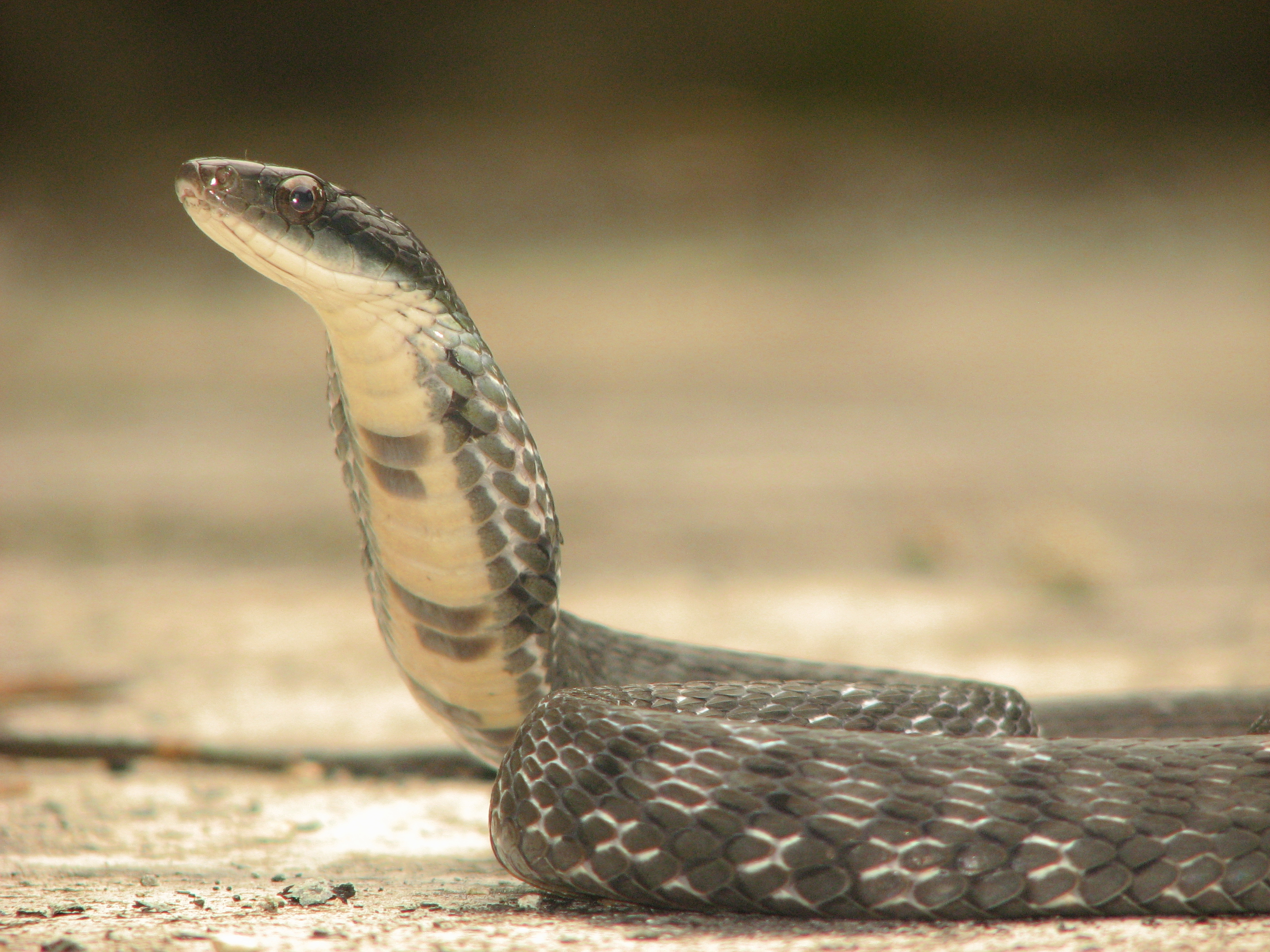
False cobra Pseudoxenodon macrops in Arunachal Pradesh, India

P. macrops is a fairly variable species with brownish and almost blackish shades with short crossbars.

== Diet ==
P. macrops preys on frogs and lizards.

== Venom ==
P. macrops is a mildly venomous species. However, the potency of its venom is currently unknown.

== Reproduction ==
P. macrops is an oviparous species. An adult female may lay as many as 10 eggs.

== Subspecies ==
There are three known subspecies including, the nominotypical subspecies.

- Pseudoxenodon macrops fukiensis Pope, 1928
- Pseudoxenodon macrops macrops (Blyth, 1855)
- Pseudoxenodon macrops sinensis Boulenger, 1904

Nota bene: A binomial authority or a trinomial authority in parentheses indicates that the species or subspecies was originally described in a genus other than Pseodoxenodon.

== Geographic range ==
P. macrops is found in Northeast India (Darjeeling, Assam, Arunachal Pradesh, Mizoram, Sikkim), Nepal, Bhutan, Myanmar, Thailand, West Malaysia, Vietnam, Laos, SW China (Yunnan, Guangxi, Guangdong, Fujian, Sichuan, Guizhou ?, Gansu). It is also found in Sylhet region of Bangladesh.
