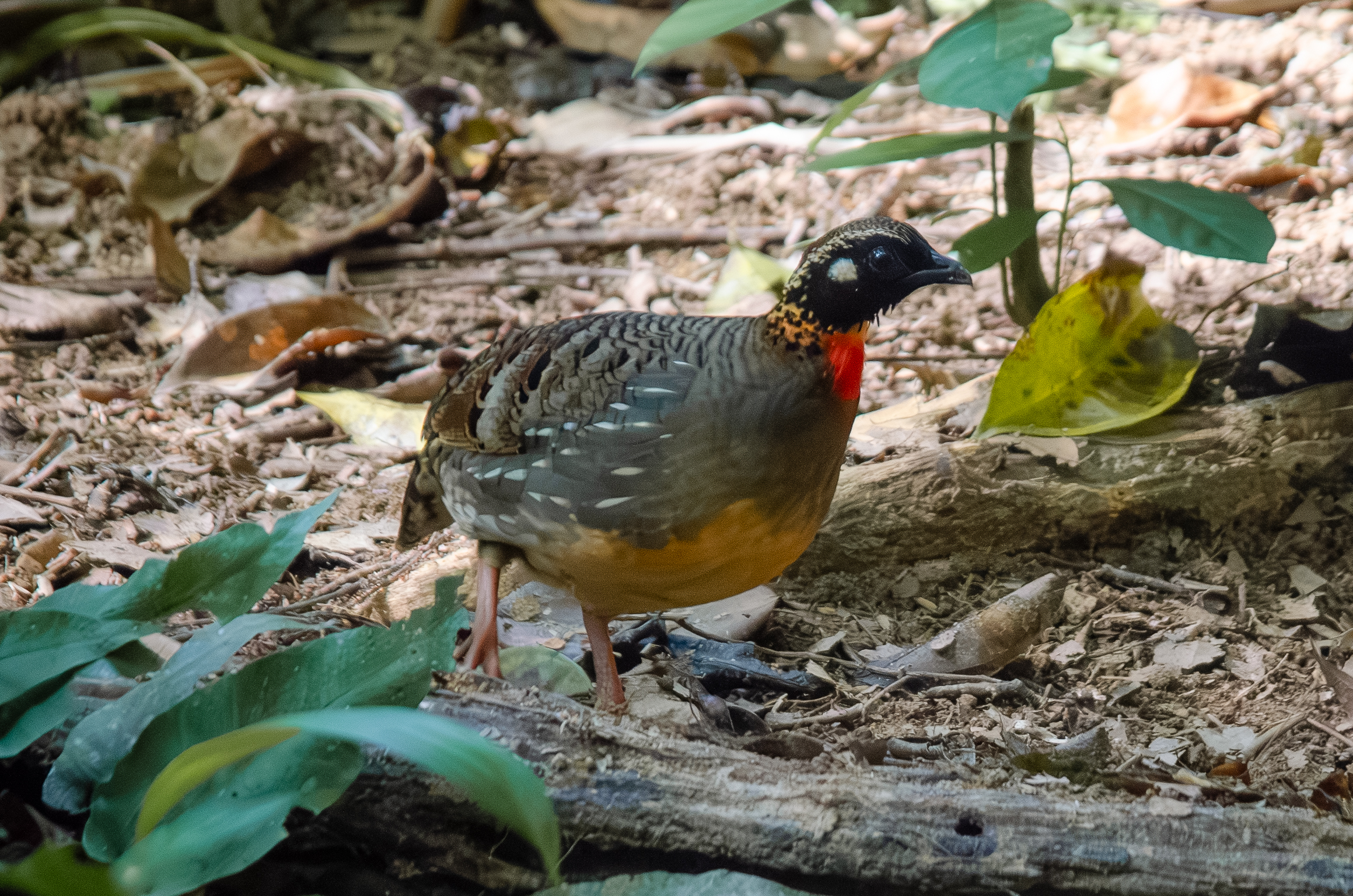

Conservation status
- Vulnerable (IUCN 3.1)

Scientific classification
- Kingdom: Animalia
- Phylum: Chordata
- Class: Aves
- Order: Galliformes
- Family: Phasianidae
- Genus: Arborophila
- Species: A. ardens

Binomial name
- Arborophila ardens (Styan, 1892)

Synonyms
- Arboricola ardens Styan, 1892

= Hainan partridge =

Species of bird

The Hainan partridge (Arborophila ardens) is a species of bird in the family Phasianidae. It is endemic to Hainan Island, China. Its natural habitats are primary evergreen forests. It is threatened by habitat loss and has been assessed as a vulnerable species.

== Taxonomy ==
This species was described by Styan in 1892. It is monotypic.

== Description ==
The Hainan partridge is 26–28 cm (10–11 in) long. The male weighs about 300 g (11 oz), and the female weighs about 237 g (8.4 oz). The head is blackish, and there is a white patch on the ear coverts and a whitish supercilium. The crown and nape are dark brown, with black mottles. The upperparts are olive-brown and have black scales. The throat and neck-sides are blackish, and there is an orange collar around the lower neck. The underparts are grey, and the central belly is buffish. The wings are greyish-brown. The beak is black, the eyes are brown, and the legs are dull reddish. The female is smaller and less bright than the male.

== Distribution and habitat ==
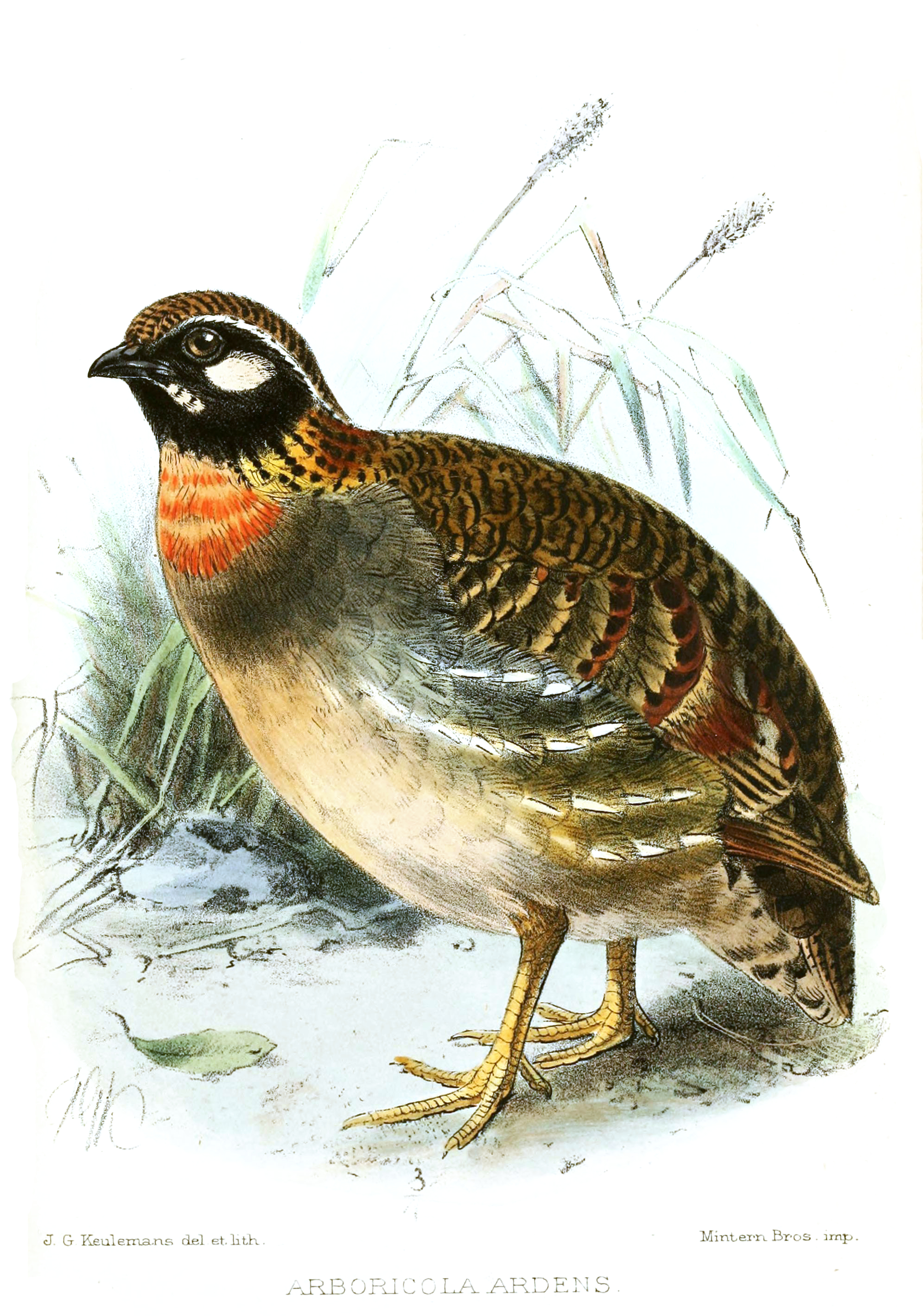
An illustration by of a Hainan Partridge

The Hainan partridge is endemic to Hainan, although there are unsubstantiated reports from Guangxi. Its habitat is primary evergreen forests that are broadleaved or mixed coniferous-broadleaved, at elevations of 600–1,600 m (2,000–5,200 ft). It also occurs in forests that have recovered from logging.

== Behaviour ==
There is little information about this partridge's behaviour. It presumably behaves like other species in its genus. Single birds, pairs and coveys have been observed. It eats snails and seeds. Its call is two notes repeated, including ju-gu ju-gu ju-gu. Sometimes a second bird gives quick single notes.

== Status ==
The population has been estimated at 2,500–9,999 mature birds. There was probably a rapid population decline because of habitat loss. New populations have been discovered since 2002 and more forest has been protected, so the decline may have slowed. The species is threatened by forest clearance for timber and agriculture, and illegal hunting. Climate change may also be a threat. Because of its small, declining population and small range, the IUCN has assessed it as a vulnerable species. In China, the Hainan partridge is a nationally protected species. Of the 660 km^{2} (250 sq mi) of suitable habitat, 410 km^{2} (160 sq mi) are in nature reserves such as Hainan Bawangling National Nature Reserve, Jianfengling, Wuzhishan, Diaoluoshan Limushan and Nanweiling.
