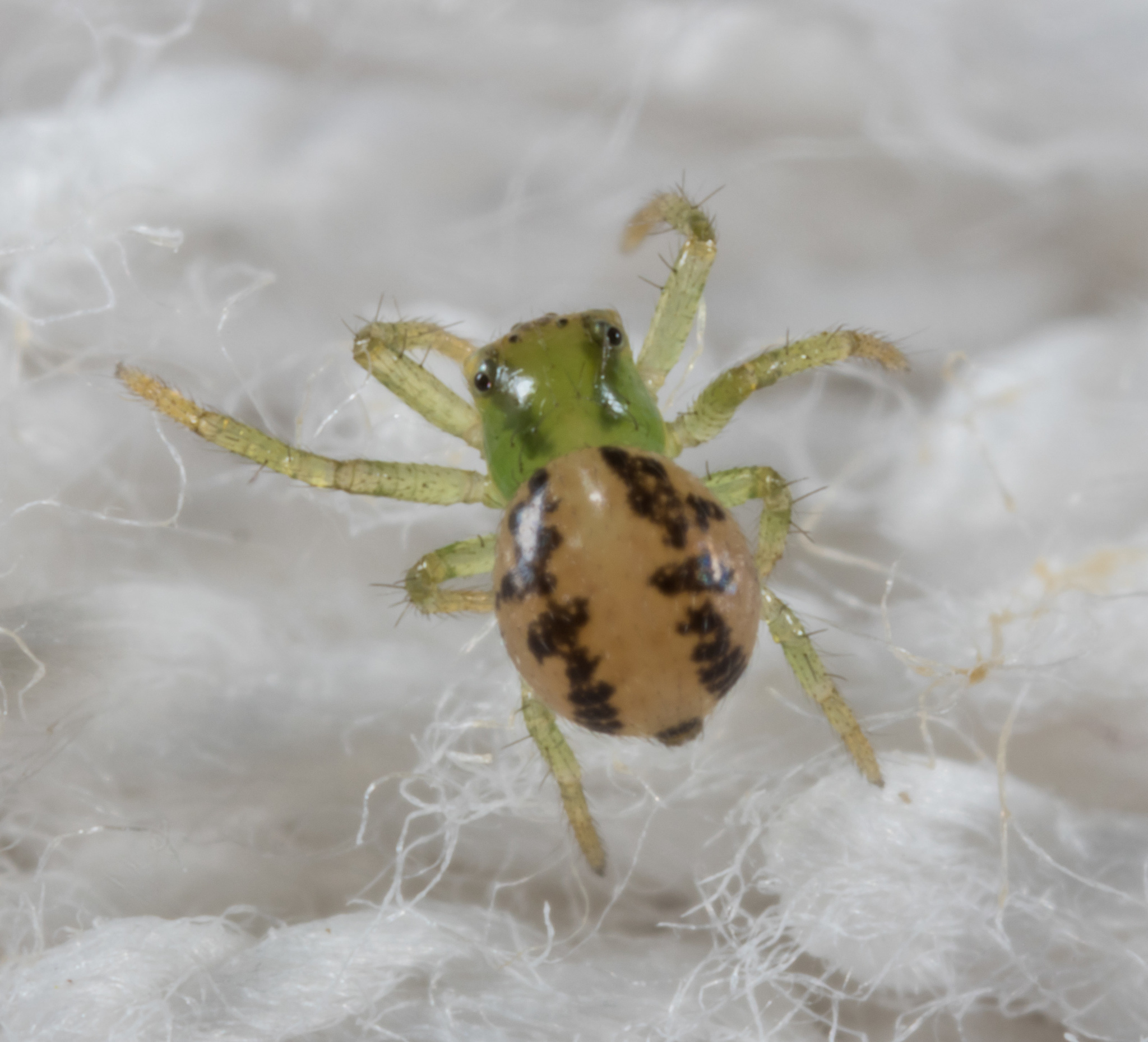
- female from Hong Kong

Scientific classification
- Kingdom: Animalia
- Phylum: Arthropoda
- Subphylum: Chelicerata
- Class: Arachnida
- Order: Araneae
- Infraorder: Araneomorphae
- Family: Thomisidae
- Genus: Lysiteles
- Species: L. minusculus

Binomial name
- Lysiteles minusculus Song & Chai, 1990

= Lysiteles minusculus =

Species of crab spider

Lysiteles minusculus is a species of crab spider in the family Thomisidae. It is found in China and Bhutan.

== Etymology ==
The specific name minusculus is derived from Latin, meaning "rather small" or "tiny", referring to the spider's small body size.

== Distribution ==
L. minusculus has been recorded from Hubei and Hainan provinces in China, as well as Bhutan. The holotype male was collected from Xuan'en County, Hubei Province in 1989.

== Description ==
Lysiteles minusculus is a small crab spider with notable sexual dimorphism in size. Males have a total body length ranging from 2.00 to 2.60 mm, while females are slightly larger at 2.10–2.70 mm.

The male cephalothorax is dark brown in color, with the front lateral eyes being the largest, followed by the rear lateral eyes, and the rear median eyes being the smallest. The rear lateral eyes are small and indistinct. The legs are relatively long compared to other species in the genus, with the inner margins slightly concave, causing the left and right legs to form an elongated fissure where they meet.

Females have a light yellow prosoma and yellow legs with sparse spines. The opisthosoma displays two longitudinal grayish black stripes on the dorsal surface, while the ventral surface is yellow. The leg formula is II, I, IV, III, indicating the relative lengths of the leg pairs.

The male pedipalp features a wide ventral tibial apophysis (VTA) and a sickle-shaped retrolateral tibial apophysis (RTA) that is combined with the VTA proximally. The embolus is curved and arc-shaped. The female epigyne has a pair of copulatory openings positioned bilaterally, with short copulatory ducts that are not visible from the dorsal view, and globular spermathecae.

== Habitat ==
This species has been collected from mountainous regions at various elevations, including specimens from Limushan Mountains at 630 m altitude, Wuzhishan Mountains at 724 m, and Bawangling Mountains at 967 m elevation.
