= Sinan Jangdo High Moor =

Designations

Ramsar Wetland
- Official name: Jangdo Wetland
- Designated: 30 March 2005
- Reference no.: 1458

The Jangdo high moor is an island and natural mountainous wetland in the Republic of Korea, which is located in the marine island ecosystem about 100 km from the Korean Peninsula. The Jangdo Island high moor is the only high moor on an island in Republic of Korea. The site is formed as a large piece on top of the island and also largest in the united area of high moor in ROK. This is unique as other high moor lands are composed of small separated pieces of moor lands.

== Formation ==
It was preliminarily considered that Jangdo wetland was a concave landform formed by the weathering of granite intruding Precambrian silicified metasedimentary rocks. At many places, the granite-weathered topography was observed. The formation scenario of Jangdo wetland is such due to the flood or slope mass movement of regolith, rock fragments were moved to form a low-relief slope landform. As a result, wetland was formed. By analyzing the slope soil and wetland sediment, we conjectured that Jangdo wetland depended on the influence of peripheral slope soil. In these concave landform environment, the supply of water and organic materials was sustained for a long time to form an organic non degradable wetland environment. In addition, the plants appropriate to this wetland environment were settled to thicken the wetland. This is how the present Jangdo wetland was thought to be formed.

== Current status ==
Having an area of 0.09 km2, the high moor is designated as a “National Wetland Conservation Area” on 31 August 2004 by the Ministry of Environment. In addition, it was also designated as Ramsar Wetland on 30 March 2005.

== Organisms ==
There are 84 families, 209 genera, 294 species found in the high moor. The species in the Jangdo Island high moor are mostly tropical plants even though the island is not located in tropical area.

=== Birds ===
- Peregrine falcon (Falco peregrinus)
- Oriental honey buzzard (Pernis ptilorhynchus)
- Japanese sparrowhawk (Accipiter gularis)
- Eurasian hobby (Falco subbuteo)
- Amur falcon (Falco amurensis)
- Japanese wood pigeon (Columba janthina)
- Light-vented bulbul (Pycnonotus sinensis)

=== Plants ===
- Impatiens koreana
- Korean snow (Hosta yingeri)
- Rosa kokusanensis
- Wind orchid (Neofinetia falcate)
