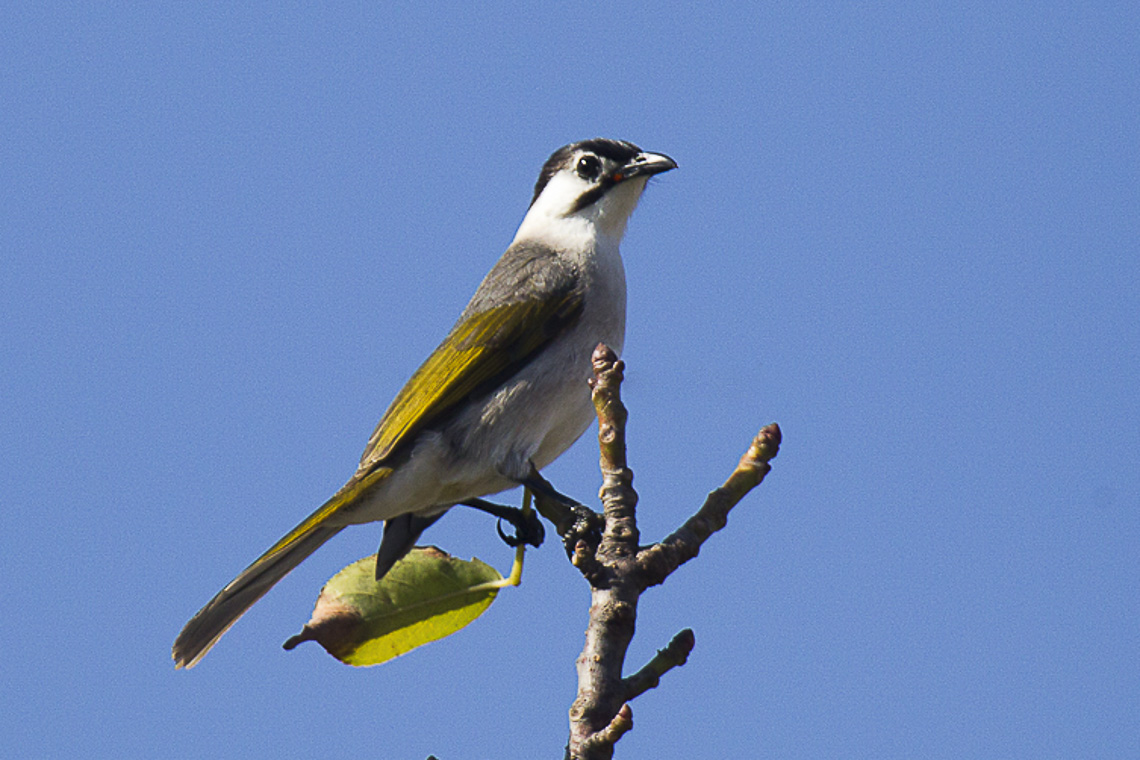

Conservation status
- Vulnerable (IUCN 3.1)

Scientific classification
- Domain: Eukaryota
- Kingdom: Animalia
- Phylum: Chordata
- Class: Aves
- Order: Passeriformes
- Family: Pycnonotidae
- Genus: Pycnonotus
- Species: P. taivanus

Binomial name
- Pycnonotus taivanus Styan, 1893
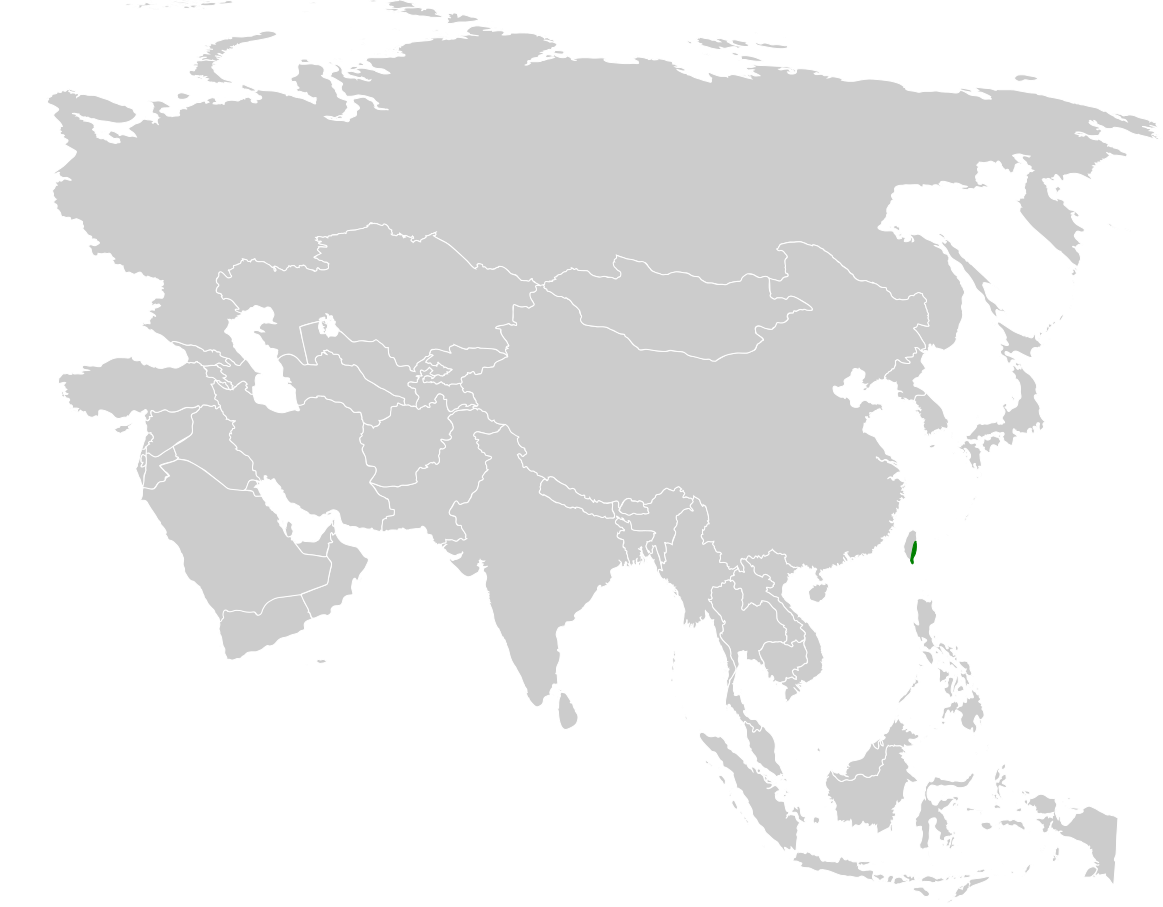
- Distribution of Styan's bulbul on Taiwan

= Styan's bulbul =

Species of bird

Styan's bulbul (Pycnonotus taivanus) is a species of bulbul that is endemic to eastern and southern Taiwan. Though locally common in some areas, it has been listed as a species vulnerable to extinction. Its decline has been caused by habitat destruction and hybridisation with the closely related Chinese or light-vented bulbul. The two species' ranges overlap in several areas, partly because birds of the latter species have been released for Buddhist ceremonies. The species has already become extinct in Yilan County (Taiwan).

== Taxonomy and systematics ==
Alternate names for Styan's bulbul include the Formosan black-headed bulbul and Taiwan black-headed bulbul. The latter name is also used to refer to a subspecies of the light-vented bulbul.

== Description ==
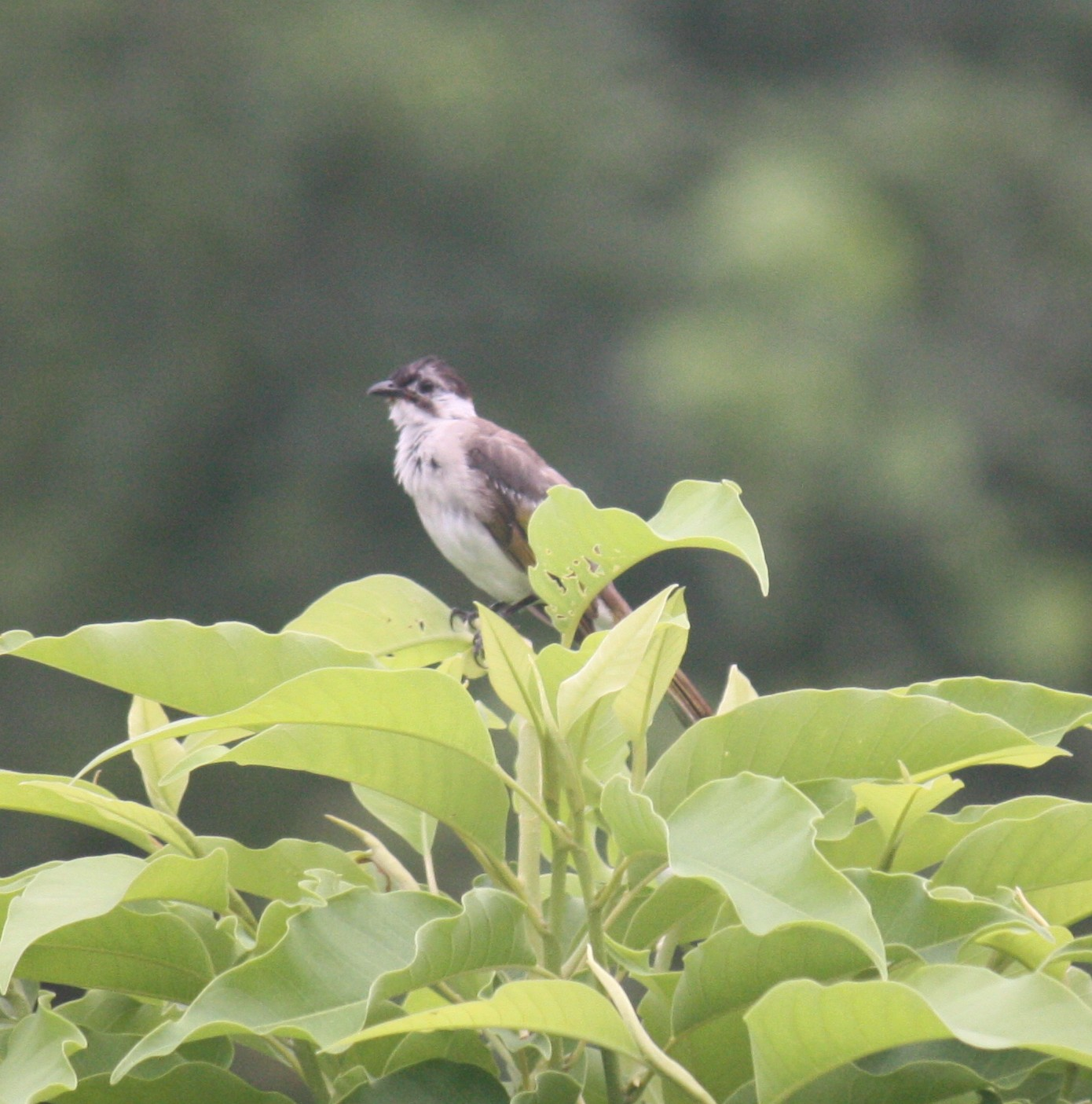
On the east coast of Taiwan

Styan's bulbul has a very similar appearance to the light-vented bulbul, but they differ in the patterns on the head. Styan's bulbul has a completely black crown with white feathers around its eye, except for a black moustachial stripe below the beak. Hybrids are intermediate between the two species, with the moustachial stripe and white feathers around the eye, but the white feathers extend behind the crown.
