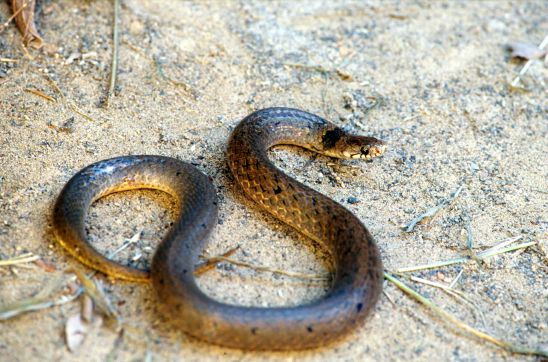

Conservation status
- Least Concern (IUCN 3.1)

Scientific classification
- Kingdom: Animalia
- Phylum: Chordata
- Class: Reptilia
- Order: Squamata
- Suborder: Serpentes
- Family: Colubridae
- Genus: Plagiopholis
- Species: P. styani

Binomial name
- Plagiopholis styani (Boulenger, 1899)

Synonyms
- Trirhinopholis styani Boulenger, 1899; Plagiopholis styani — Ding & Zheng, 1974

= Plagiopholis styani =

Species of snake

Plagiopholis styani, also known by the common name Chinese mountain snake, is a species of colubrid snake. Its type locality is Kuatun (Guadun in modern spelling: Chinese: 挂墩; pinyin: guàdūn) in Wuyishan, Fujian. It is found in southern and central China, Taiwan, and northern Vietnam. It is an uncommon species, and very rare in Taiwan. It is named after Frederick William Styan, a Shanghai-based English tea merchant and ornithologist.

== Description ==
Plagiopholis styani is a small non-venomous snake, reaching a total length (including tail) of up to 40 cm (16 in). Its upper head, body and tail are red-brown, olive-brown, or green-brown, with flecks of pink or black pigment on each scale, especially for those on the flanks of body. The upper body and tail have a spotted pattern of black or light yellow. There is a dark and thick cross band on nape, reflected in its Chinese name, Fujian neck-blotched snake (Chinese: 福建頸斑蛇).

== Habitat and ecology ==
Plagiopholis styani occurs in areas of montane and bamboo forest, including caves. It is a nocturnal snake that eats mainly earthworms and arthropods. It uses its head to burrow. Females produce clutches of 5–11 eggs in summer.
