= Plagiopholis nuchalis =

Assam mountain snake

Conservation status
- Least Concern (IUCN 3.1)

Scientific classification
- Kingdom: Animalia
- Phylum: Chordata
- Class: Reptilia
- Order: Squamata
- Suborder: Serpentes
- Family: Colubridae
- Genus: Plagiopholis
- Species: P. nuchalis

Binomial name
- Plagiopholis nuchalis (Boulenger, 1893)

Synonyms
- Trirhinopholis nuchalis Boulenger, 1893; Oligodon evansi Wall, 1913 (fide M.A. Smith, 1943); Trirhinopholis nuchalis — Wall, 1921 (fide M.A. Smith, 1943); Plagiopholis nuchalis — M.A. Smith, 1940; Plagiopholis nuchalis — M.A. Smith, 1943

Species of snake

Plagiopholis nuchalis, commonly known as the Assam mountain snake, is a species of snake in the family Colubridae. The species is endemic to Asia.

== Geographic range ==
P. nuchalis is found in China (Yunnan), Laos, Myanmar, and Thailand. It may possibly also be found in India (Assam) and Vietnam.

== Description ==
A small snake, P. nuchalis may attain a total length of 45 cm (18 in), which includes a tail 5.5 cm (2.2 in) long. Dorsally it is blackish brown, with many of the dorsal scales edged with black. On the neck there is a broad black chevron, pointing forward, to which the specific name, nuchalis, refers. Ventrally it is yellowish, marked with black.

== Reproduction ==
P. nuchalis is oviparous.
