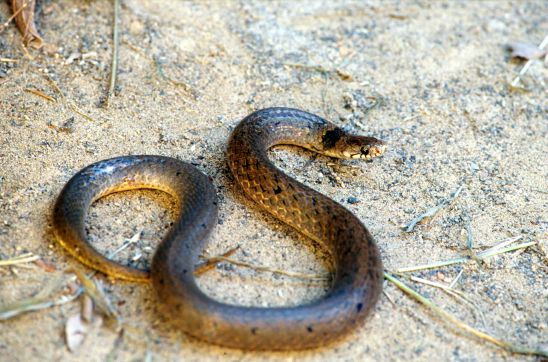
- Plagiopholis styani

Scientific classification
- Kingdom: Animalia
- Phylum: Chordata
- Class: Reptilia
- Order: Squamata
- Suborder: Serpentes
- Family: Colubridae
- Subfamily: Pseudoxenodontinae
- Genus: Plagiopholis; Boulenger, 1893

= Plagiopholis =

Genus of snakes

Plagiopholis is a genus of snakes in the family Colubridae. The genus is native to Asia.

== General Facts ==
The species of the genus Plagiopholis are found in Southeast Asia, China and Taiwan. The snakes of this genus are mountainous species that can be found in grasses and bushes. They feed primarily on earthworms, frogs, and arthropods (Zhao 2006). All species are oviparous, meaning they use internal fertilization to lay eggs. The genus Plagiopholis can be distinguished from the other genus in the subfamily Pseudoxenodontinae (Pseudoxenodon) by their lower midbody scale count, entire anal plate, and smaller size (O'Shea 2018).

== List of species ==
- Plagiopholis blakewayi Boulenger, 1893 – Blakeway's mountain snake
- Plagiopholis delacouri Angel, 1929
- Plagiopholis nuchalis (Boulenger, 1893) – Assam mountain snake
- Plagiopholis styani (Boulenger, 1899) – Chinese mountain snake

Nota bene: A binomial authority in parentheses indicates that the species was originally described in a genus other than Plagiopholis.

== Etymology ==
The specific name, blakewayi, is in honor of a Lieutenant Blakeway who resigned from the British army and collected reptiles in what is now Myanmar.

The specific name, delacouri, is in honor of French-born American ornithologist Jean Théodore Delacour.

== Original publication ==
- Boulenger GA (1893). Catalogue of the Snakes in the British Museum (Natural History). Volume I., Containing the Families ... Colubridæ Aglyphæ, part. London: Trustees of the British Museum (Natural History). (Taylor and Francis, printers). xiii + 448 pp. + Plates I-XXVIII. (Plagiopholis, new genus, p. 301).().
