= Plagiopholis blakewayi =

Conservation status
- Least Concern (IUCN 3.1)

Scientific classification
- Kingdom: Animalia
- Phylum: Chordata
- Class: Reptilia
- Order: Squamata
- Suborder: Serpentes
- Family: Colubridae
- Genus: Plagiopholis
- Species: P. blakewayi

Binomial name
- Plagiopholis blakewayi Boulenger, 1893

Species of snake

Plagiopholis blakewayi, commonly known as Blakeway's mountain snake, is a species of snake in the family Colubridae. The species is found in Myanmar, Thailand, and China.
