= Plagiopholis delacouri =

Conservation status
- Data Deficient (IUCN 3.1)

Scientific classification
- Kingdom: Animalia
- Phylum: Chordata
- Class: Reptilia
- Order: Squamata
- Suborder: Serpentes
- Family: Colubridae
- Genus: Plagiopholis
- Species: P. delacouri

Binomial name
- Plagiopholis delacouri Angel, 1929

Species of snake

Plagiopholis delacouri is a species of snake in the family Colubridae. The species is found in Laos and Vietnam.
