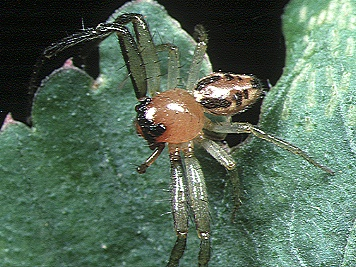
- L. miniatus, male
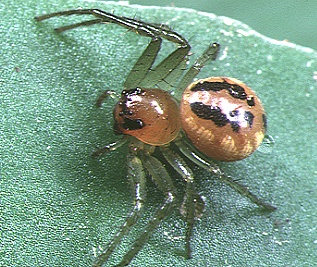
- L. miniatus, female

Scientific classification
- Kingdom: Animalia
- Phylum: Arthropoda
- Subphylum: Chelicerata
- Class: Arachnida
- Order: Araneae
- Infraorder: Araneomorphae
- Family: Thomisidae
- Genus: Lysiteles; Simon, 1895

Species
- 62, see text

= Lysiteles =

Genus of spiders

Lysiteles is a genus of Asian crab spiders first described by Eugène Simon in 1895.

== Species ==
As of December 2022 it contains 62 species:

- L. ambrosii Ono, 2001 – Bhutan, China
- L. amoenus Ono, 1980 – Bhutan, Taiwan
- L. anchorus Zhu, Lian & Ono, 2004 – China
- L. annapurnus Ono, 1979 – Nepal
- L. arcuatus Tang, Yin, Peng, Ubick & Griswold, 2008 – China
- L. auriculatus Tang, Yin, Peng, Ubick & Griswold, 2008 – China
- L. badongensis Song & Chai, 1990 – China
- L. bhutanus Ono, 2001 – Bhutan, China
- L. bicuspidatus Yu, Li & Jin, 2017 – China
- L. boteus Barrion & Litsinger, 1995 – Philippines
- L. brunettii (Tikader, 1962) – India
- L. catulus Simon, 1895 – India
- L. clavellatus Tang, Yin, Peng, Ubick & Griswold, 2008 – China
- L. conflatus Tang, Yin, Peng, Ubick & Griswold, 2008 – China
- L. conicus Tang, Yin, Peng, Ubick & Griswold, 2007 – China, Vietnam
- L. coronatus (Grube, 1861) – Russia (Far East), China, Korea, Japan
- L. corrugus Tang, Yin, Peng, Ubick & Griswold, 2008 – China
- L. curvatus Tang, Yin, Peng, Ubick & Griswold, 2008 – China
- L. davidi Tang, Yin, Peng, Ubick & Griswold, 2007 – China
- L. dentatus Tang, Yin, Peng, Ubick & Griswold, 2007 – China, Vietnam
- L. dianicus Song & Zhao, 1994 – China
- L. digitatus Zhang, Zhu & Tso, 2006 – Taiwan
- L. distortus Tang, Yin, Peng, Ubick & Griswold, 2008 – China
- L. excultus (O. Pickard-Cambridge, 1885) – India, Pakistan
- L. fanjingensis (Wang, Gan & Mi, 2020) – China
- L. furcatus Tang & Li, 2010 – China
- L. guoi Tang, Yin, Peng, Ubick & Griswold, 2008 – China
- L. himalayensis Ono, 1979 – Nepal, Bhutan, China
- L. hongkong Song, Zhu & Wu, 1997 – China
- L. inflatus Song & Chai, 1990 – China
- L. kunmingensis Song & Zhao, 1994 – Bhutan, China
- L. leptosiphus Tang & Li, 2010 – China
- L. lepusculus Ono, 1979 – Nepal
- L. linzhiensis Hu, 2001 – China
- L. magkalapitus Barrion & Litsinger, 1995 – Philippines
- L. maius Ono, 1979 – Russia (South Siberia, Far East), Nepal to Japan
- L. mandali (Tikader, 1966) – India, China
- L. miniatus Ono, 1980 – Japan (Ryukyu Is.)
- L. minimus (Schenkel, 1953) – China
- L. minusculus Song & Chai, 1990 – Bhutan, China
- L. montivagus Ono, 1979 – Nepal
- L. nanfengmian (Liu, 2022) – China
- L. niger Ono, 1979 – Nepal, Bhutan, China
- L. nudus Yu & Zhang, 2017 – China
- L. okumae Ono, 1980 – Japan
- L. parvulus Ono, 1979 – Nepal
- L. punctiger Ono, 2001 – Bhutan, China, Vietnam
- L. qiuae Song & Wang, 1991 – China
- L. saltus Ono, 1979 – Nepal, Bhutan, China
- L. silvanus Ono, 1980 – China, Taiwan
- L. sorsogonensis Barrion & Litsinger, 1995 – Philippines
- L. spirellus Tang, Yin, Peng, Ubick & Griswold, 2008 – China
- L. subdianicus Tang, Yin, Peng, Ubick & Griswold, 2008 – China
- L. subspirellus (Liu, 2022) – China
- L. suwertikos Barrion & Litsinger, 1995 – Philippines
- L. torsivus Zhang, Zhu & Tso, 2006 – China, Taiwan, Vietnam
- L. transversus Tang, Yin, Peng, Ubick & Griswold, 2008 – China
- L. umalii Barrion & Litsinger, 1995 – Philippines
- L. uniprocessus Tang, Yin, Peng, Ubick & Griswold, 2008 – China
- L. vietnamensis Logunov & Jäger, 2015 – Vietnam
- L. wenensis Song, 1995 – China
- L. wittmeri Ono, 2001 – Bhutan
