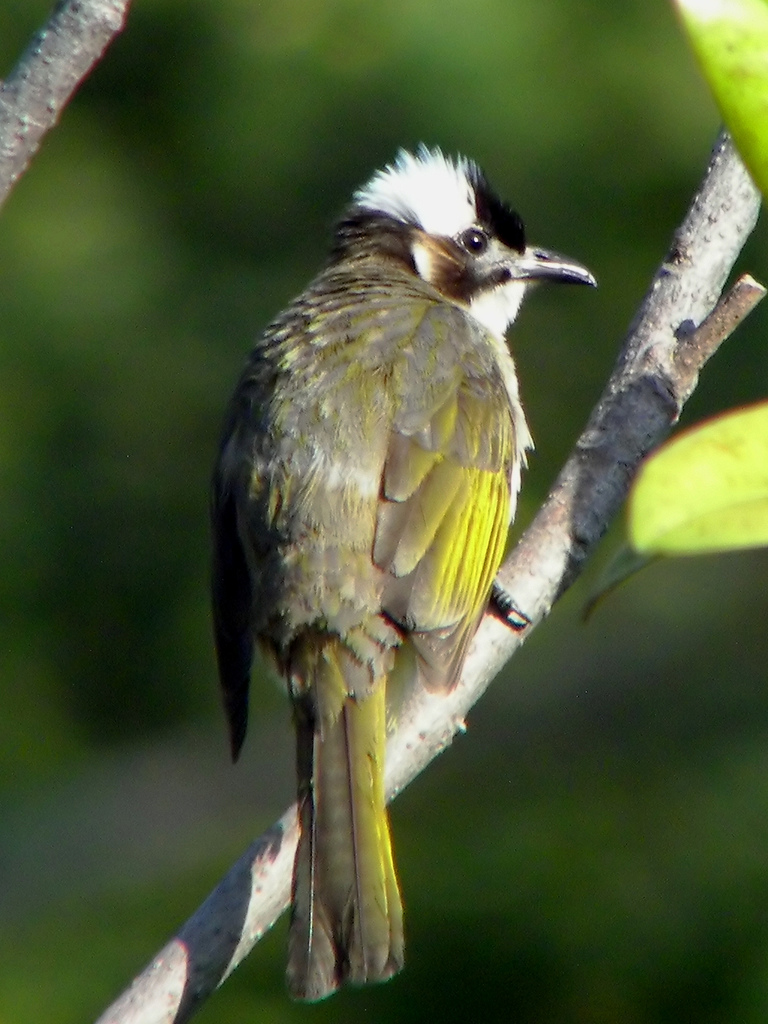

Conservation status
- Least Concern (IUCN 3.1)

Scientific classification
- Kingdom: Animalia
- Phylum: Chordata
- Class: Aves
- Order: Passeriformes
- Family: Pycnonotidae
- Genus: Pycnonotus
- Species: P. sinensis

Binomial name
- Pycnonotus sinensis (Gmelin, JF, 1789)
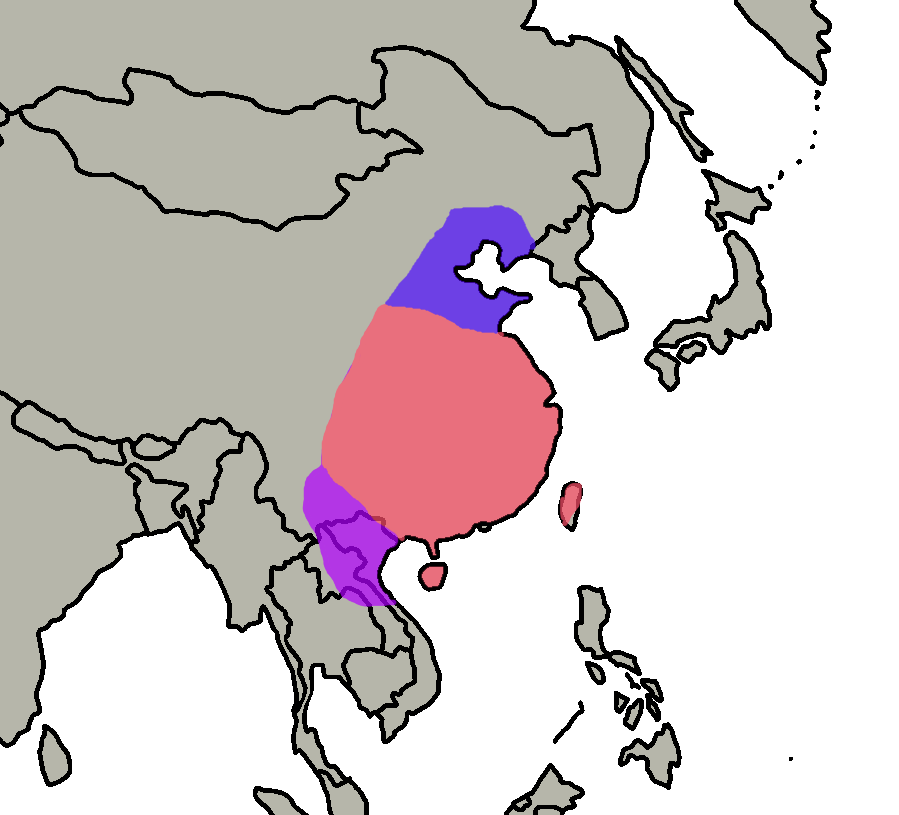
- Blue: Extant (breeding), Pink: Extant (resident), Purple: Extant (non-breeding)

Synonyms
- Muscicapa sinensis

= Light-vented bulbul =

Species of bird

The light-vented bulbul (Pycnonotus sinensis), also called the Chinese bulbul, is a species of bird in the bulbul family found in Asia. A common species of songbird that favors lightly wooded habitats, it can frequently be seen in towns, suburbs and urban parks within its range.

== Description ==
The light-vented bulbul is around 19 cm (7.5 in) in length. It has a black crown and moustachial stripe, with white patches covering the nape and the sides of its black head. It has white plumage from its eyes to the back of its head. The upperparts are greyish-brown mixed with olive. The wings and tail are brown fringed with bright olive. The underparts are whitish with a pale brown breastband. It is noisy and sings very brightly and variably with a cha-ko-lee...cha-ko-lee... sound.

In Hong Kong, the light-vented bulbul is abundant in lightly wooded areas, cultivated land and shrubland, whereas the red-whiskered bulbul is the common bulbul of suburbs and urban parks.

In Taiwan, however, the light-vented bulbul dominates all of these habitats, though it is replaced along the east coast by Styan's bulbul. Chinese bulbuls are seen frequently in Shanghai, where it is perhaps the third most common bird after tree sparrows and spotted doves.

== Taxonomy ==
The light-vented bulbul was formally described in 1789 by the German naturalist Johann Friedrich Gmelin in his revised and expanded edition of Carl Linnaeus's Systema Naturae. He placed it with the flycatchers in the genus Muscicapa and coined the binomial name Muscicapa sinensis. The specific epithet is Modern Latin for "Chinese". Gmelin based his entry on "Le gobe-mouches verdâtre de la Chine" that had been described in 1782 by the French naturalist Pierre Sonnerat. The type location has been restricted to Guangzhou (Canton). The light-vented bulbul is now one of 32 species placed in the genus Pycnonotus that was introduced in 1836 by the German zoologist Friedrich Boie.

Four subspecies are recognized:

- P. s. sinensis (Gmelin, JF, 1789) – found in central and eastern China.
- P. s. hainanus (Swinhoe, 1870) – originally described as a separate species in the genus Ixos. Found in south-eastern China and northern Vietnam.
- P. s. formosae Hartert, E, 1910 – found on Taiwan.
- P. s. orii Kuroda, Nm, 1923 – found on Yonaguni, Okinawa, Iriomote and Ishigaki Islands (southern Ryukyu Islands).
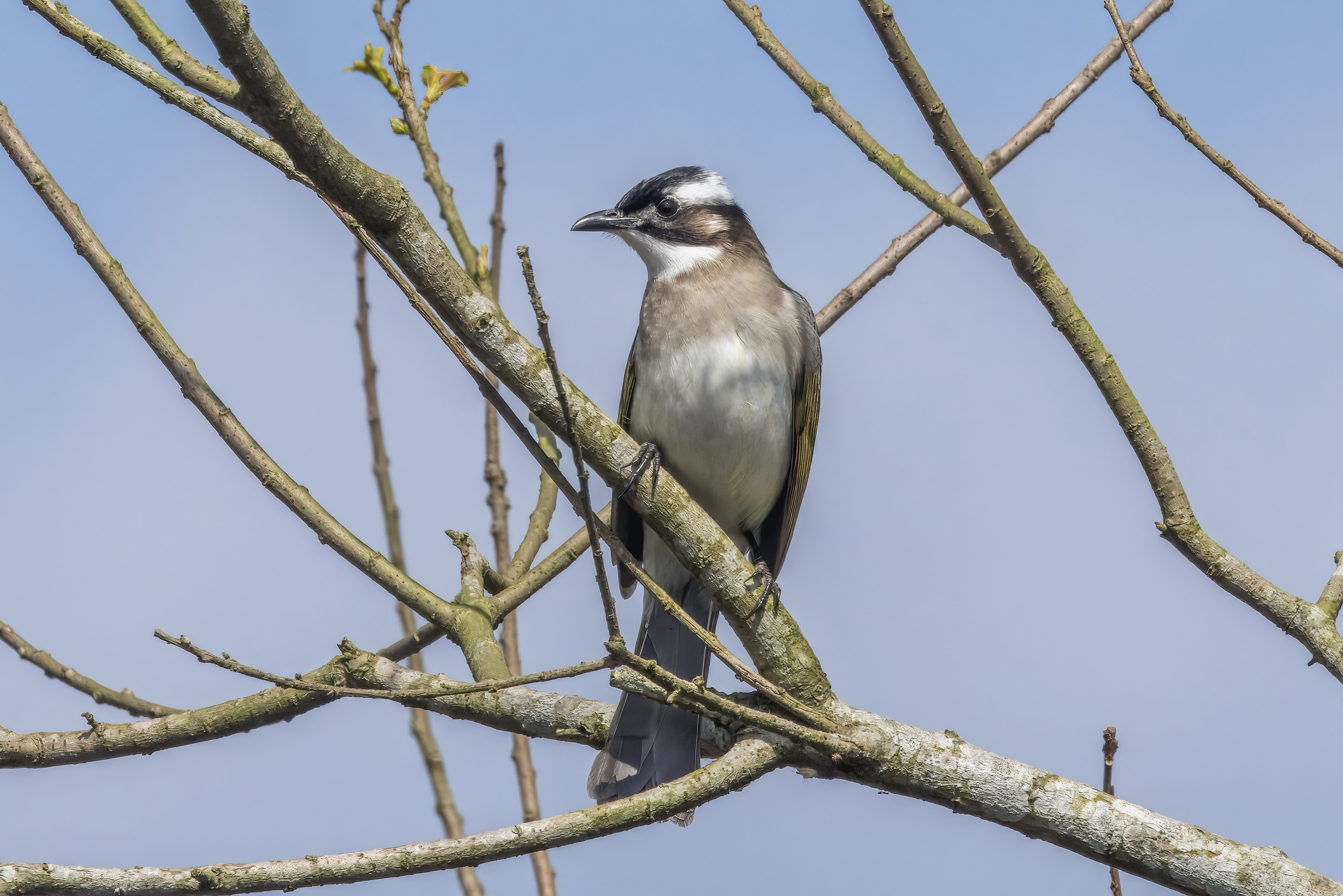
P. s. formosae perching, Taiwan

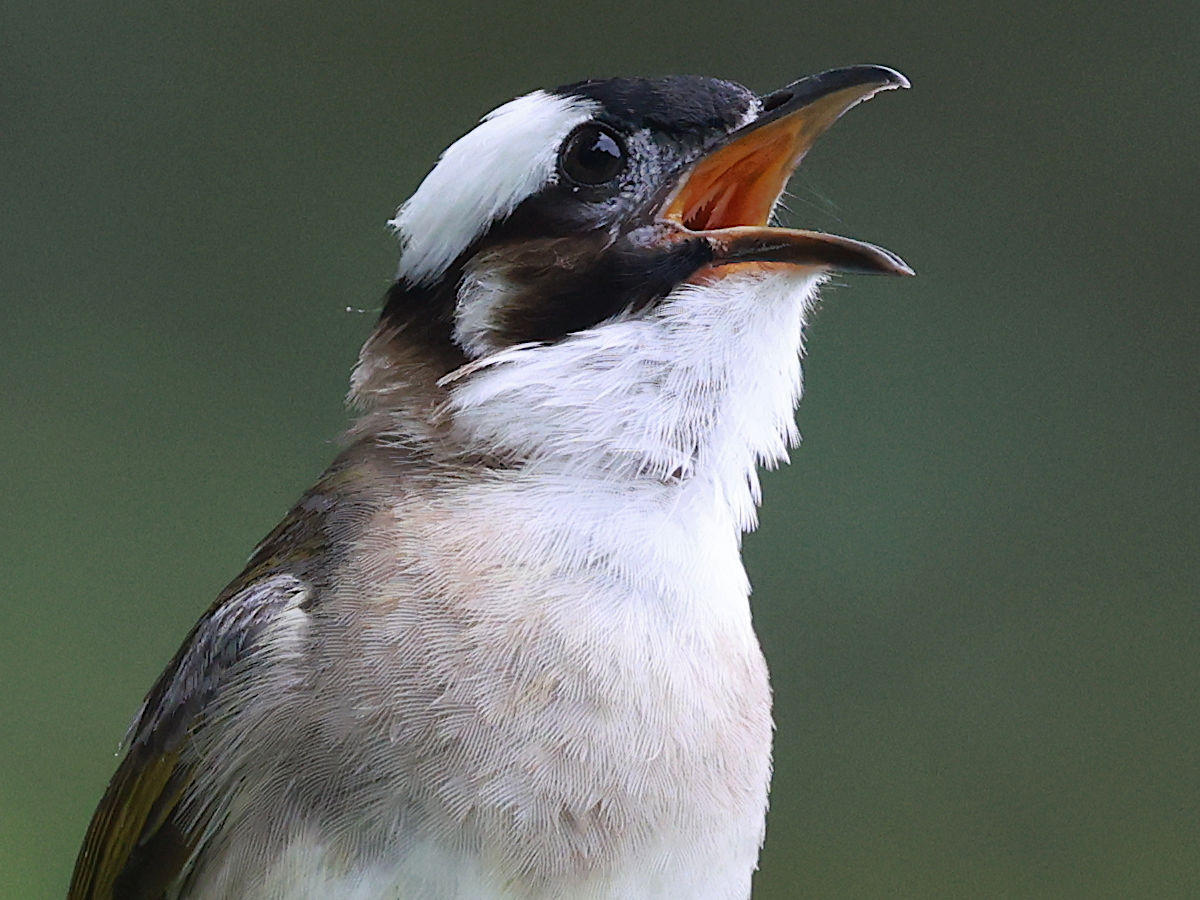
P. s. formosae singing, Taiwan
