= Hainan Bawangling National Nature Reserve =

Natural reserve in Hainan, China

Coordinates: 19.1214°N 109.0814°E

- Location: Changjiang County, Hainan, China
- Area: 8,444.3 ha (32.604 sq mi)
- Website: Official website

The Hainan Bawangling National Nature Reserve (Chinese: 海南霸王岭国家级自然保护) is a nature reserve in Changjiang County, western Hainan, China. It is home to the Hainan black crested gibbon, which is on the verge of extinction, and Hainan partridge. The total area of the reserve is 8,444.3 hectares.

It was founded in 1980.
