= Frederick William Styan =

English tea merchant

Frederick William Styan (1858 – 15 September 1934) was an English tea merchant who spent many years in China. During his stay he obtained numerous specimens of fauna which were donated to the British Museum (Natural History). Several species such as Styan's bulbul are named after him.

Styan was born in London to Thomas Styan (1819-1899) and Frances Sarah Lake (1823-1924). He worked as a clerk for Robert Anderson and Co. tea traders in Shanghai and Fuzhou from 1895 to 1903. His father was also a naturalist and collector of bird specimens which were bequeathed to his son. Along with J.D. La Touche and Charles Boughey Rickett they went on several expeditions to collect natural history specimens in China. Some were deposited in the museum in Shanghai while others were sent to the natural history museum in London. Styan maintained a personal collection of bird skins which he once displayed at the North China Insurance Company on Hankow Road in Shanghai. He also served as an honorary curator of the Shanghai Museum. He published a few notes on the birds of China. Paralysis led to his leaving China and returning to England. Most of his specimens found their way to the Natural History Museum collections either directly or via the collections of Styan's friend John Kershaw.

Styan is commemorated in the scientific name of a species of Chinese snake, Plagiopholis styani.
